= Harrington Lodge =

18th-century house in London, England

- Interactive map of the Harrington Lodge area

General information
- Location: Petersham, London, England
- Coordinates: 51.4437°N 0.3016°W
- Completed: c. 1700

Listed Building – Grade II*
- Official name: Harrington Lodge
- Designated: 10 January 1950
- Reference no.: 1252875

Harrington Lodge is a Grade II* listed house in Petersham, London that was built around 1700.

The house was likely built as a hunting lodge for the nearby Richmond Park, its third of an acre gardens have been opened to the public on numerous occasions as part of London Open Gardens, run by London Parks and Gardens.
