= Château-Neuf de Saint-Germain-en-Laye =

Château in Yvelines, France

Coordinates: 48°53′53″N 2°6′4″E

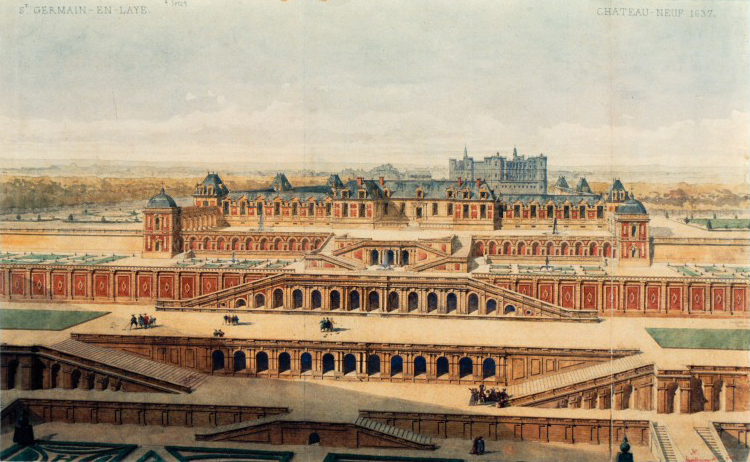
Château-Neuf in 1637, by Auguste Alexandre Guillaumot (1815–1892) (Gallica)

The Château-Neuf de Saint-Germain-en-Laye ("New Château of Saint-Germain-en-Laye") was a French château in Saint-Germain-en-Laye, now mostly demolished, which served as a royal residence from the second half of the 16th century until 1680. It was built on the grounds of the older Château de Saint-Germain-en-Laye, which became known as the Château-Vieux (Old Château).

== Construction ==
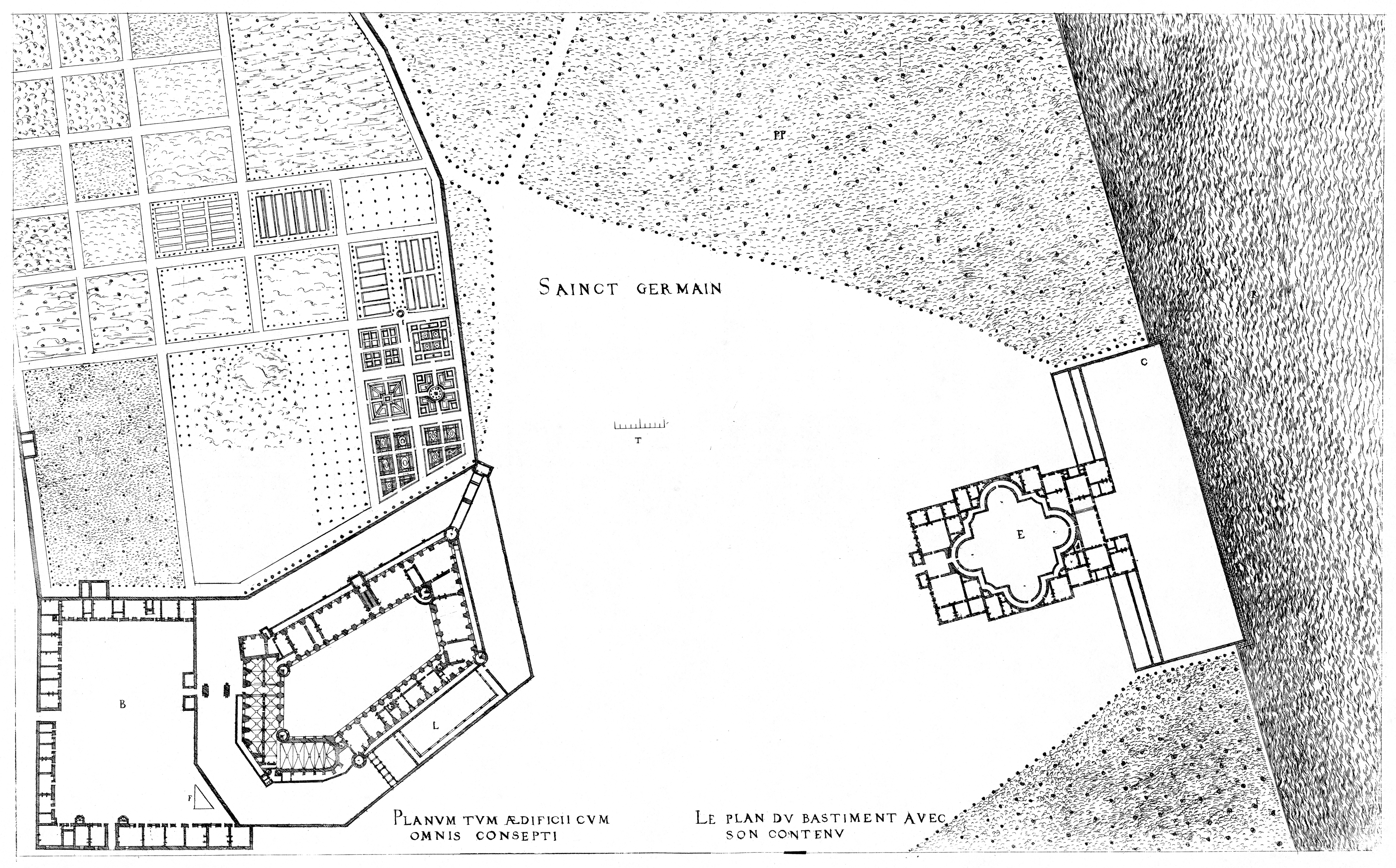
General plan with the Château-Vieux on the left and the Château-Neuf on the right, engraving by Jacques Androuet du Cerceau (1576)

The central building, on the edge of the terrace, was ordered in 1556 by Henry II of France and Catherine de' Medici and was built by Philibert de l'Orme. Called in its day la maison du théâtre (the theater house), a succession of terraces and stairs gave access to the baignerie (from French baigner, "to bathe") on the Seine.

From the beginning of his reign in 1593, King Henry IV would come to Saint-Germain because he took pleasure in the view the château and its terraces offered of the valley of the Seine, a view like that of his birthplace, the Château de Pau. He ordered from Baptiste Androuet du Cerceau an expansion of the terraces by the Seine. Work began in 1594.

Quickly finished by executive architect Jean de Fourcy, with Guillaume Marchant conducting the masonry work, the job involved the installation of grottoes, with automated fountains made by Italians, the Francini brothers, Thomas and Alexandre. The French garden, spread out by the Seine on five terraces, was designed by landscape designer Étienne Dupérac and by gardener Claude Mollet.

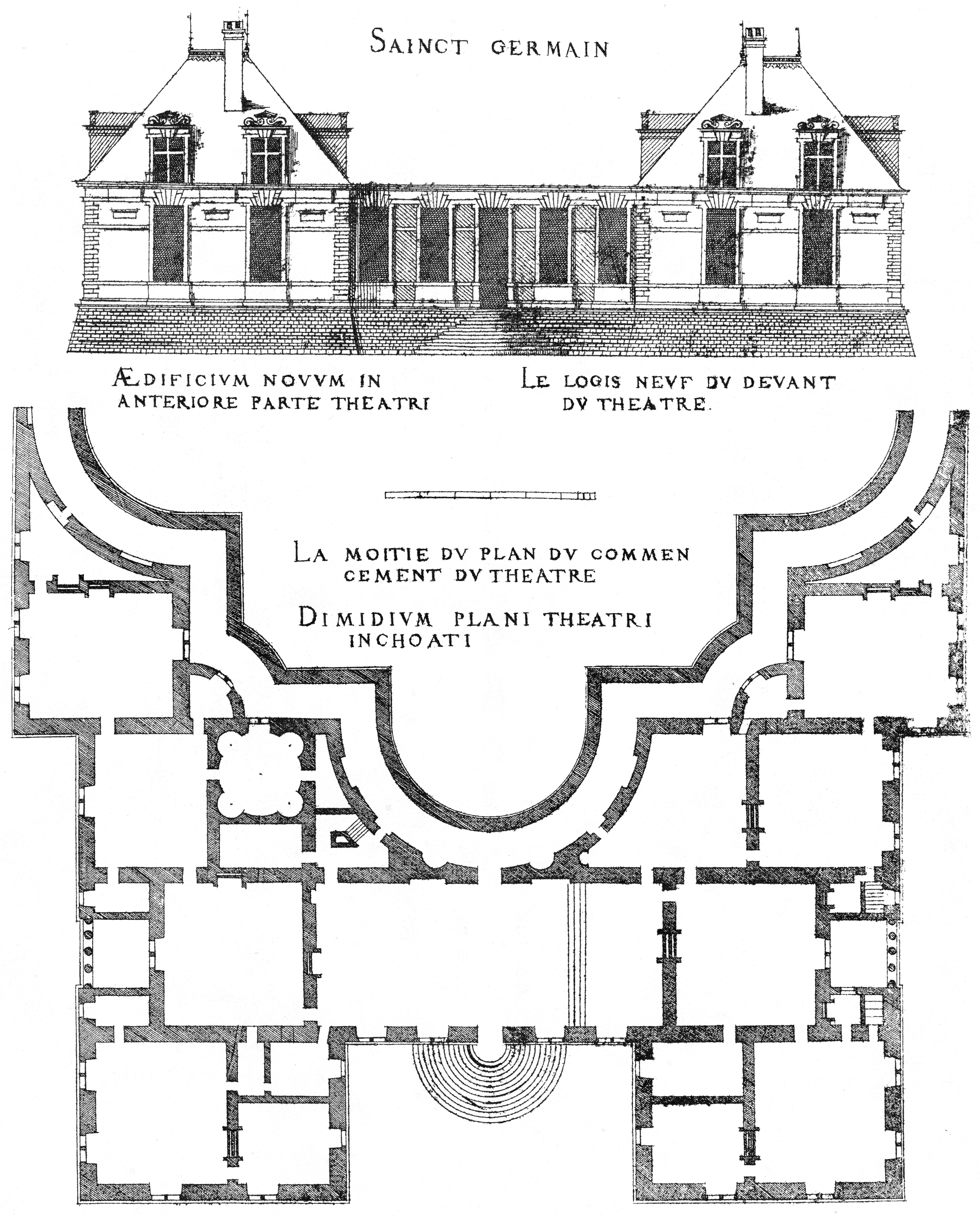
Riverside elevation and partial plan of the Château-Neuf, engraving by Androuet du Cerceau (1576)

== History ==
At the outset, the château was the dwelling of those who had it built: Henry II, who died in 1559 (from a lance wound received in a tournament in Paris, three years after the château was begun); and, above all, his wife, Catherine de' Medici.

Henry II would expand Château-Neuf considerably and sojourn there regularly, while his numerous children, legitimate and bastard, lived at Château-Vieux.

Catherine stopped going to the château toward the end of her life in 1589, after her astrologer, Côme Ruggieri, predicted that she would meet her death in Saint-Germain.

In August 1561, the year after the death of King Francis II of France on 5 December 1560, the Queen of Navarre arrived in Saint-Germain escorted by a grand cortège at the head of which rode her spirited second husband, the Duke of Vendôme. Several days of festivals ensued with diverse games and even a bullfight. Among the guests was their son, the nearly 8-year-old Henri de Béarn, the future Henry IV, and Henry II's third son, the 10-year-old Duke of Orléans who would become the future Henry III.

It was in this château that "Louis-Dieudonné" (Louis the God-given), the future King Louis XIV, was born on 5 September 1638. His father, Louis XIII, died there on 14 May 1643.

Château-Neuf was the refuge of Henrietta Maria of France, the widow of Charles I of England, who by 1649 had established her court here. By 1650 she was joined by her son the future Charles II of England.

During the Fronde, the French civil war in the mid-17th century, the "Grande Mademoiselle", Anne Marie Louise, Duchess of Montpensier, came to Saint-Germain seeking asylum and installed herself at Château-Neuf where "she lay in a wonderfully beautiful chamber in a ruined tower, well-gilded and large but with no glass in the windows and a meager fire."

In 1668, a grand ceremony was organized that set off from the Château-Neuf for the baptism of the Grand Dauphin at the Sainte Chapelle of the Old Château.

In 1682, the French Court left Saint-Germain for the Palace of Versailles.

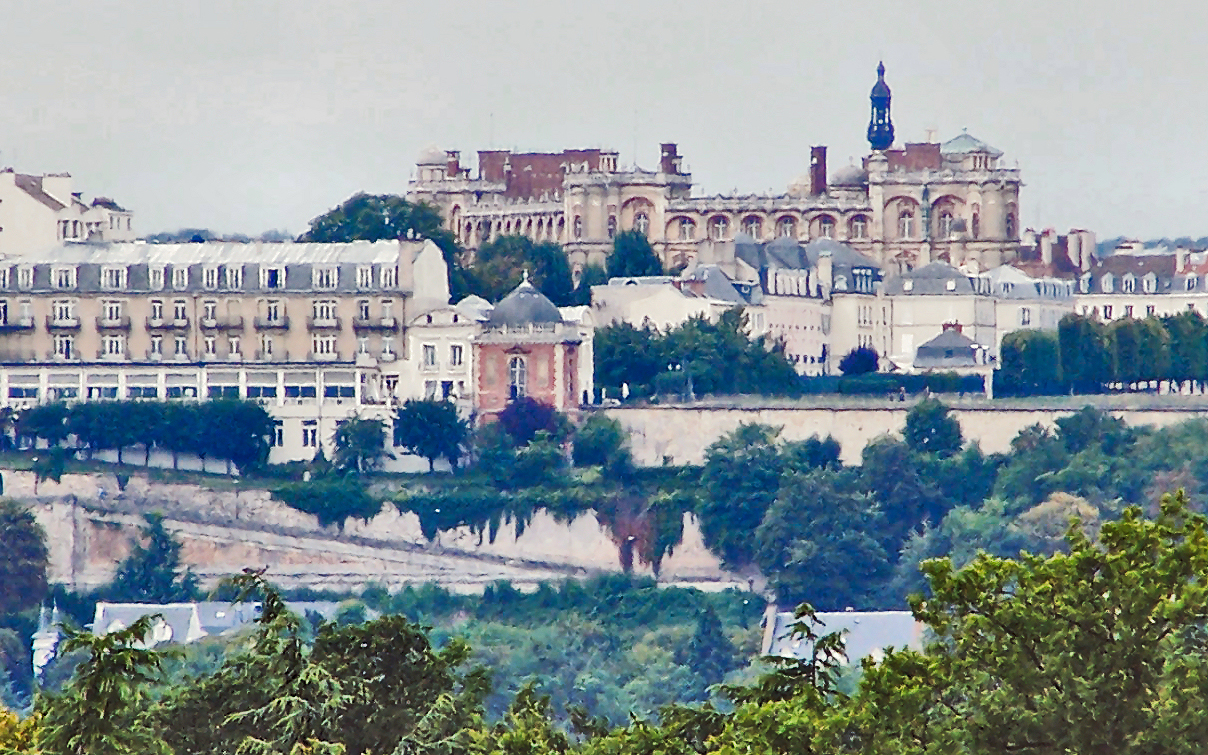
Remains of Château-Neuf: the pavilion of Henri IV in red brick and part of a ramp

On 17 January 1688 Louis XIV allowed the exiled James II of England to base himself at Saint-Germain. There he stayed with his court in Château-Neuf, and then in the two châteaux, until his death.

In the 1770s, the dilapidated château was given by Louis XVI to his younger brother the Count of Artois with the sum of 600,000 livres for work to be done on it. Demolition and reconstruction projects were carried out by the architects Joseph Bélanger and François Chalgrin.

When the Revolution came, the château was declared bien national and sold to its former manager, who demolished it, parceled out the land, and sold the materials. Nothing remains today but the Pavilion of Henry IV, the Pavillon du jardinier, and a few vestiges of the cellars to be found in the neighborhood – 3 rue des Arcades, for example.

== See also ==
- Château de Saint-Germain-en-Laye

== Sources ==
- Sauvageot, Claude (1867). Palais, châteaux, hôtels et maisons de France du XVème au XVIII siècle. Vol. Deuxième. Paris: A. Morel. OCLC 174837244.
