= Duck Island Cottage =

Cottage in St James's Park, London

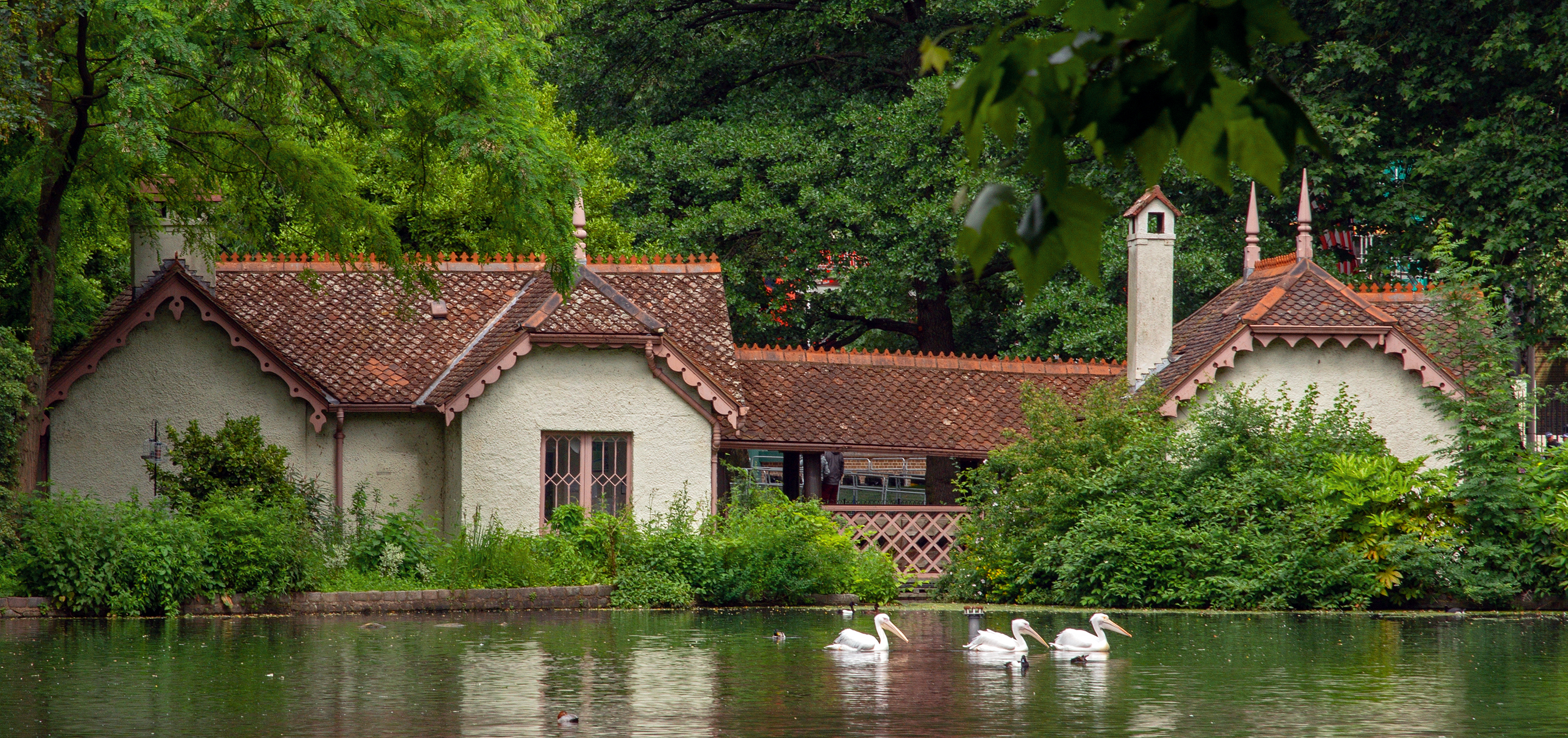
- Interactive map of the Duck Island Cottage area

General information
- Type: Lodge
- Architectural style: Cottage orné
- Location: St James's Park, London, England
- Coordinates: 51°30′11″N 0°07′49″W
- Completed: 1841

Design and construction
- Architect: John Burges Watson

Listed Building – Grade II
- Official name: Duck Island Cottage (Royal Ornithological Society)
- Designated: 5 February 1970
- Reference no.: 1235670

Duck Island Cottage is a Grade II listed cottage at the eastern end of the lake in St James's Park, London, England. It was built between 1840 and 1841 both as a residence for the park's bird keeper and as the headquarters of the Ornithological Society of London. It currently serves as the headquarters of the London Parks and Gardens Trust.

== Background ==
In 1660, king Charles II ordered the landscaping of St James's Park in the style of a French Garden with designs carried out by André Mollet including a long rectangular canal running down the middle. At the eastern end a duck decoy was created to provide for the meals at the royal court. The artificial area of land came to be known as Duck Island and began to be used more as a garden than a functional decoy. Charles also had created the largely ceremonial post of "Governor of Duck Island".

William III later ordered the construction of the first building on the site of the cottage, a tea-house. Duck Island itself came to be given as a perquisite to the Rangers of St James's Park, to the amusement of holders of the post. The island, becoming unkempt, was cleared in 1771, reemerging some decades later under John Nash's redesign of the park in 1827. In his design the lake adopted a more informal character, following the sensibilities of the English landscape garden.

== History ==
The Ornithological Society of London, founded in 1837, was created with the aim of protecting and encouraging the presence of waterfowl in the park. In 1840, they managed to petition the Commissioners of the park to construct a cottage as the house of a specialist bird-keeper for the park, securing a £300 grant for the construction of the cottage. The cottage was designed by John Burges Watson and completed by 1841.

The Ornithological Society struggled in the decades following, and were forced to concede Duck Island Cottage to the Commission in 1870 with the cottage to be used entirely as a residence for the bird-keeper of the park. In 1894 the Home Office designated Duck Island as a safe site for Vivian Majendie, the bomb disposal expert, to make safe any terrorist explosive devices discovered in nearby Westminster. The bird-keeper was paid a small stipend for keeping the equipment in good order.

The cottage fell into disrepair once again in the 1950s and designs for a new cottage were drawn. After encouragement from the Royal Fine Art Commission the cottage was instead preserved. Marshall Sisson, who had been asked to provide new designs which were dropped, later exhibited them at the Royal Academy Exhibition of that year. Restoration was undertaken in 1982. The cottage was given over for usage as the headquarters of the London Parks and Gardens Trust in 1994.

== Wildlife and bird-keeping ==
Duck Island has served as the centre of bird-keeping in St James's Park since the seventeenth century. The cottage was constructed in 1840–1841 as the residence of the park's bird-keeper and as the headquarters of the Ornithological Society of London, whose objective was to protect and encourage the park's waterfowl.

Following the dissolution of the Ornithological Society's involvement in 1870, the cottage continued to serve as the official residence of the park's bird-keeper. Duck Island itself remains an important wildlife refuge within St James's Park and is managed by The Royal Parks as a sanctuary for breeding waterfowl and other bird species. Because of its conservation role, the island is not generally accessible to the public.

Among the birds associated with Duck Island are the park's resident population of waterfowl and the famous colony of great white pelicans, a tradition dating to 1664 when pelicans were presented to Charles II by the Russian ambassador. The island provides an important resting and nesting area for these and other birds within the park.

== Design ==
The cottage's architect, Watson, was known for his rural designs. He produced an asymmetrical cottage orné built to contrast with the grander buildings along Whitehall. The cottage originally consisted of a keeper's house on the island itself, connected by a loggia to a clubroom on the land facing Horse Guards Road. Many additions were made at various times, including a steam hatching apparatus, although most of these were removed with the 1982 works aiming to restore much of the original design.
