= David Gwyn =

David Gwyn (fl. 1588) was an English poet.

He suffered a long and cruel imprisonment in Spain (Calender of State Papers, Dom. 1581–90, p. 220). Upon regaining his liberty, he published a poetical narrative of his sufferings, entitled Certaine English Verses penned by David Gwyn, who for the space of elueven Yeares and ten Moneths was in most grieuous Servitude in the Gallies, vnder the King of Spaine, London, 1588. In this tract, consisting of eleven pages, are three poems presented by the author to Queen Elizabeth in St James's Park on Sunday, 18 August 1588 (Arber, Stationers' Registers, ii. 232). Only one copy is at present known; it fetched 20l. 15s. at the sale of Thomas Jolley's library in 1843–1844.
