= Conservation and restoration of historic gardens =

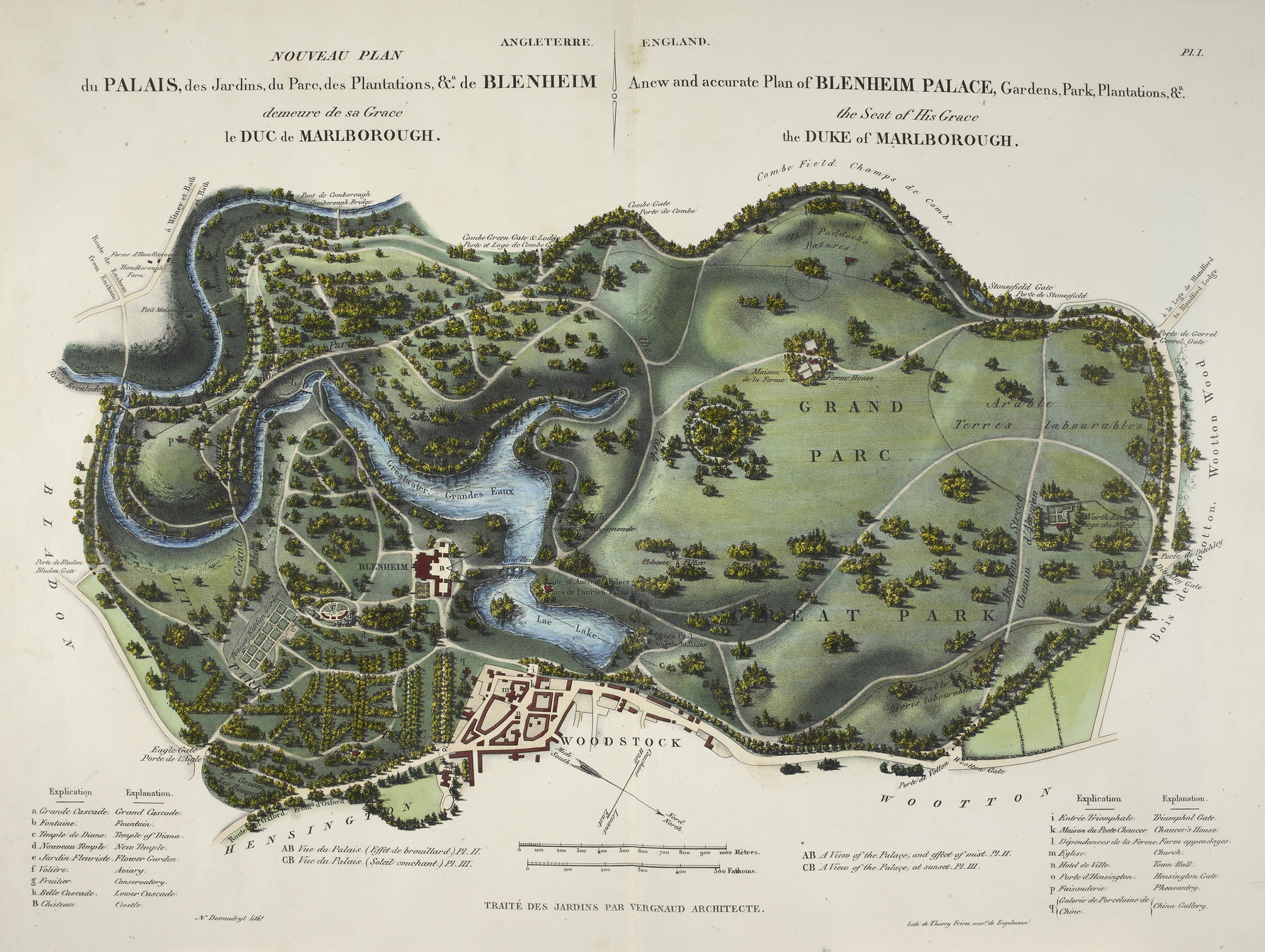
An 1835 estate map of the landscaped parkland at Blenheim Palace, in Oxfordshire, England

Historic garden conservation is a specialised type of historic preservation and conservation or restoration concerned with historical and landmark gardens and designed landscapes.

== Profession ==
Practitioners predominantly come from backgrounds in horticulture, garden design, landscape design, and landscape architecture. To prepare a management plan for a historic garden, such experts require knowledge and skills in environmental design, horticulture, landscape history, architectural history, and management. Specialist educational programs are available (see section below).

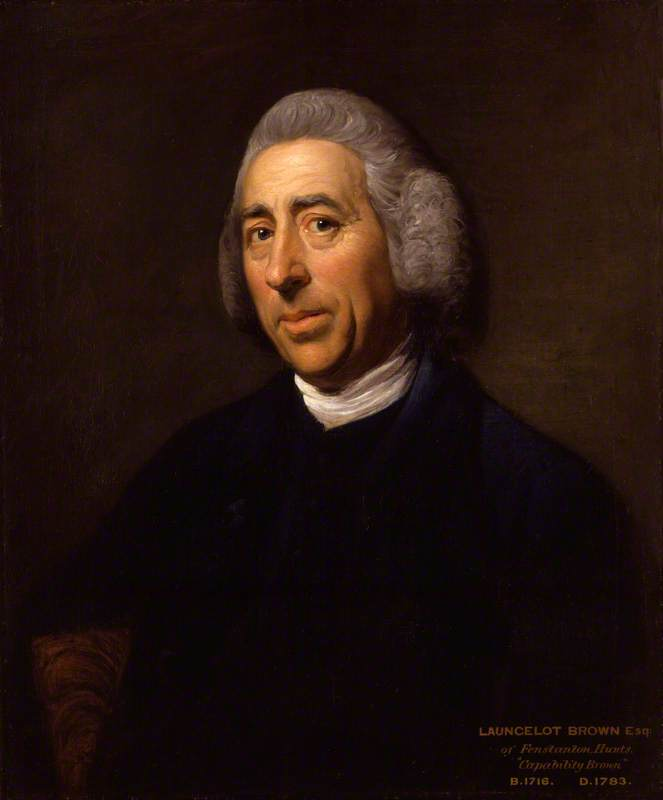
Portrait of Capability Brown by Nathaniel Dance-Holland, 1769. One of the most famous historical landscape architects, Lancelot "Capability" Brown (1716–1783)

Historic garden restoration is the professional task of restoring historic gardens to the character they had at a previous point in history. Since the use of old gardens is in flux, this normally involves a consideration of current and future use. The job of researching historic gardens and preparing a policy for their conservation involves landscape archaeology, historic knowledge, design judgment and technical skill in horticulture and construction.

== Education ==
=== United Kingdom ===
Several universities and colleges in England run undergraduate and postgraduate courses related to historic garden conservation.

- MA in garden and landscape history, Institute of Historical Research (London)
- BSc landscape management course, University of Greenwich
- Historic environment (landscapes and gardens) courses, Institute of Continuing Education (Cambridge)
- BSc garden design, restoration and management, Writtle College
- The University of Bath ran a specialist MSc / PGDip course in the conservation of historic gardens and cultural landscapes, until the 2014–15 academic year.

=== France ===
- The Institut national du patrimoine (The National Institute of Cultural Heritage) trains curators specialized in "scientific, technical and natural heritage".

== Public protection ==
=== United Kingdom ===
Statutory protection exists for registered parks, gardens and designed landscapes. There are separate heritage registers maintained for each of the four countries of the United Kingdom:

- The Register of Historic Parks and Gardens of special historic interest in England is maintained by English Heritage;
- The Cadw/ICOMOS Register of Parks and Gardens of Special Historic Interest in Wales is maintained by Cadw;
- The Inventory of Gardens and Designed Landscapes in Scotland is maintained by Historic Scotland;
- The Register of Parks, Gardens and Demesnes of Special Historic Interest is maintained by the Northern Ireland Environment Agency.

== Organisations ==
=== Australia ===
In Australia, the Australian Garden History Society is a similar organization to the UK's Garden History Society.

=== United Kingdom ===
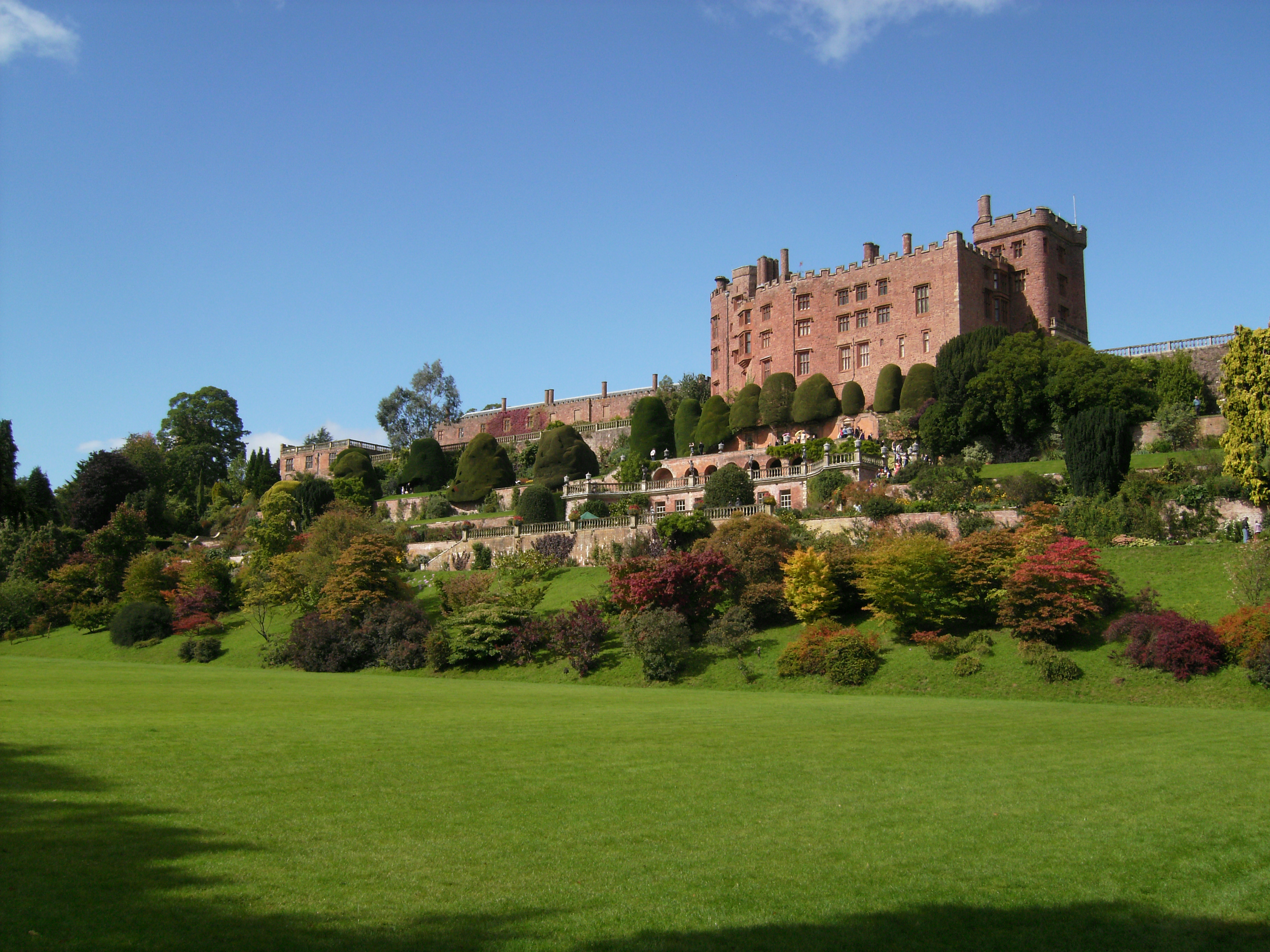
The Baroque terraced garden at Powis Castle in Wales, restored in the early 20th century and now cared for by the National Trust

In England, Wales and Northern Ireland, the National Trust, and likewise in Scotland the National Trust for Scotland, own or manage many country houses and/or the gardens and parkland attached to them, as well as other treasured gardens, parks and landscapes, on behalf of the nation.

The Garden History Society is the oldest such society in the world, forming in 1966. It became The Gardens Trust in 2015, having merged with the Association of Gardens Trusts. Its aims are to study garden history and conserve historic gardens. Since 1995 it is a statutory consultee on proposals affecting registered parks, gardens and landscapes in England. It has about 1,500 members and publishes the Garden History journal twice-yearly, as well as a regular members' newsletter. The society has an active group for Scotland, with its own regular newsletter and conservation officer.

The Welsh Historic Gardens Trust is a similar society specifically for gardens, parks and landscapes in Wales. Most of the counties of England also have their own trust, which were represented by the Association of Gardens Trusts, which since 2015 forms part of The Gardens Trust.

In London there is the Garden Museum, covering all aspects of gardening history and with a large and growing collection of historic objects such as old tools and plans.

=== United States ===
In the United States, The Garden Conservancy actively assists in the preservation of notable gardens and designed landscapes in the country.

There is also the California Garden and Landscape History Society for events and education in California specifically.

The Garden Club of Virginia has restored many of the most notable historic gardens in Virginia since its founding around 1913. A Historic Garden Week is run, in part to raise money for restorations.

The Archives of American Gardens is an archive which preserves documentation and content related to gardens in the United States. Housing over 80,000 photographic images and records pertaining to over 6,000 gardens throughout the United States, some as old as the 1870s, the Archive is part of Smithsonian Gardens, a unit of the Smithsonian Institution.

== Examples of restoration ==
=== United Kingdom ===
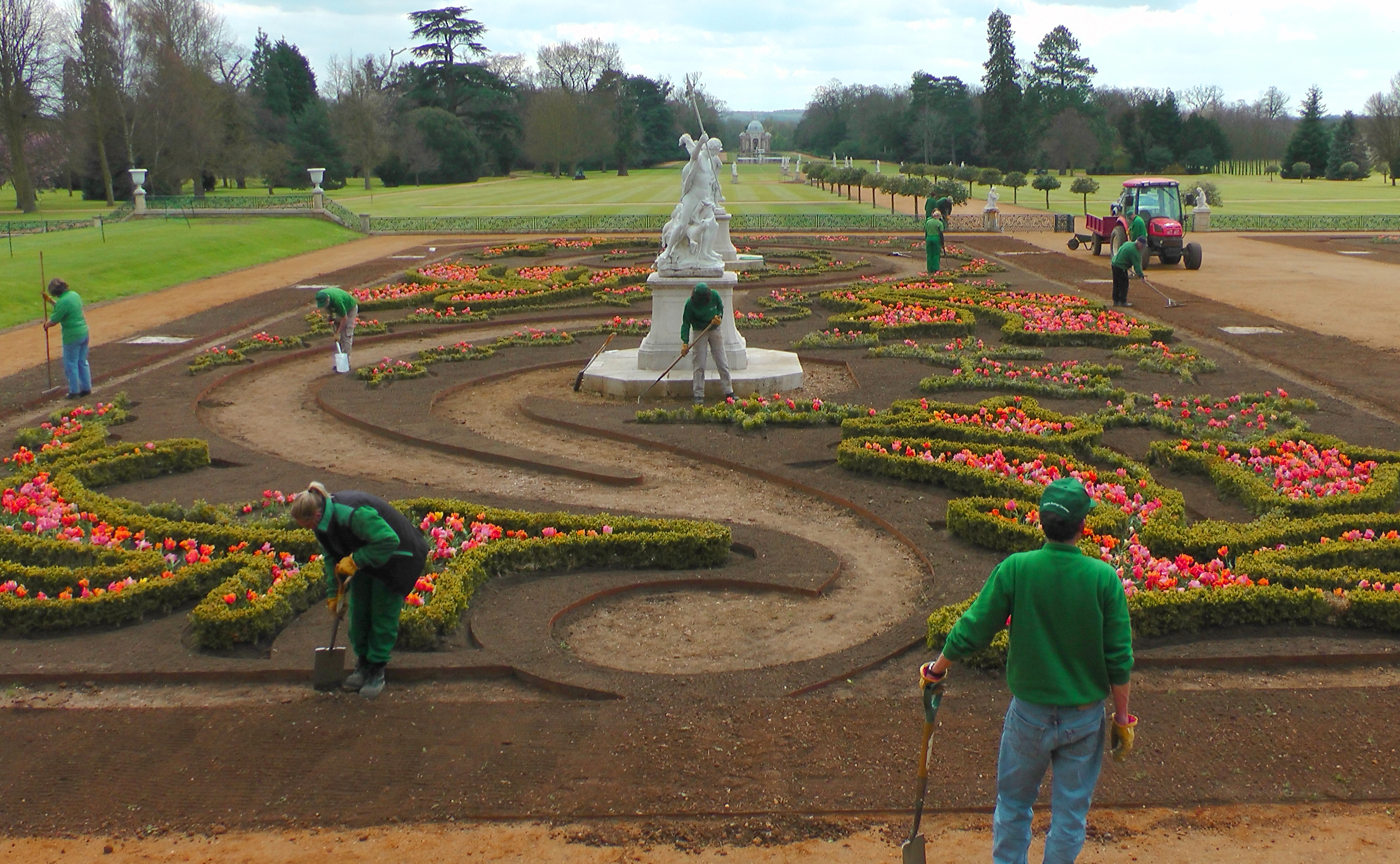
Restoration work on a parterre at Wrest Park

Recent and ongoing examples of garden conservation and restoration in England include the Privy Garden at Hampton Court Palace, Painshill in Surrey, Lowther Castle in Cumbria, Lever Park in Lancashire, Biddulph Grange in Staffordshire, Kenilworth Castle in Warwickshire, Croome Court and Witley Court in Worcestershire, Wrest Park in Bedfordshire, Westbury Court Garden in Gloucestershire, and the Lost Gardens of Heligan in Cornwall.

Many of these aim to restore a garden, or parts of it, to as near as possible its state at some earlier date. At Kenilworth this is 1575, Hampton Court and Westbury Court about 1700, rather later at Wrest Park and Painshill, and around 1760 at Croome Park. Biddulph Grange, Witley Court and Heligan are Victorian gardens (of rather different types), and Lever Park early 20th century.

== See also ==
- History of gardening
- Landscape design history
