= The Gardens Trust =

UK charity

- Formation: 24 July 2015
- Legal status: Registered Charity
- Purpose: "To promote the study of garden history and protection and conservation of historic gardens"
- Headquarters: London, England
- Location: United Kingdom
- Region served: England
- Members: 1,215 (2022)
- Leader: President: Dominic Cole
- Main organ: Board of trustees
- Website: thegardenstrust.org
- Formerly called: Garden History Society

The Gardens Trust (formerly the Garden History Society) is a national membership organisation in the United Kingdom established to study the history of gardening and to protect historic gardens.

It is a registered charity with headquarters in London.

The Trust, previously the Society, has published a quarterly journal, Garden History since 1970.

== Garden History Society ==
It was founded in 1966 as the Garden History Society and in 2015 it was renamed The Gardens Trust, after a merger with the Association of Gardens Trusts.

Membership was around 1,500 prior to its merger in 2015.

Presidents included Mavis Batey and Sir Roy Strong. The final Chairman was landscape architect Dominic Cole.

=== Statutory role ===
From 1995 the Garden History Society was a statutory consultee in relation to planning proposals which affect historic designed landscapes identified by English Heritage as being of national significance, and which are included on the Register of Parks and Gardens of Special Historic Interest in England. Thus when a planning authority received a planning application which affected a site on the Register, or the setting of such a site, the planning authority had to consult the Society.

== Editors of Garden History ==
As of 2024, the editor of Garden History is Barbara Simms (from 2004). Previous editors of Garden History are:

Christopher Thacker (1970–1980)
John Anthony (1980)
W. A. Brogden (1981–1983)
Brent Elliott (1984–1988 and 1989)
Robert Oresko (1988)
Jane Crawley and Elisabeth Whittle (1989–1997)
Jan Woudstra (1998–2004)
Andrew Eburne (2004–2006)

== Member organisations ==
The organisation has 37 affiliated local groups, including:

- London Parks and Gardens
- Yorkshire Gardens Trust

== See also ==
- Australian Garden History Society
- Garden Museum
- National Register of Historic Parks and Gardens
- Royal Horticultural Society
- Historic garden conservation
