= Claude Mollet =

French gardener and astrologer

Claude Mollet (ca. 1564 – shortly before 1649), premier jardinier du Roy — first gardener to three French kings, Henry IV, Louis XIII and the young Louis XIV — was a member of the Mollet dynasty of French garden designers in the seventeenth century. His father was Jacques Mollet, gardener at the Château d'Anet, where Italian Renaissance gardening was introduced to France and where Claude apprenticed, and his son was André Mollet, who took the French style to Holland, Sweden and England.

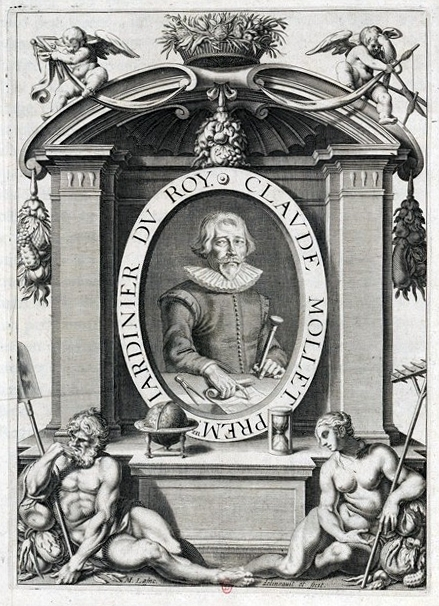
Claude Mollet from André Mollet's "le Jardin de Plaisir"

In the woodcuts in Olivier de Serres' work dedicated to Henry IV, Le Théâtre d'agriculture et mesnage des champs (Paris 1600), the plans laid out in royal gardens are by Claude Mollet, a friend of the author, who praises Mollet's designs for the herbs and shrubs speaking in letters, devices, cyphers, coats-of-arms, frames, ships and other things, imitated with marvelous industry and patience.

As de Serres did, Mollet maintained two tree nurseries, in the outskirts of the Faubourg Saint-Honoré, west of Paris. He claimed to have introduced boxwood as an edging to his parterre patterns, each like "un tapis de Turquie" ("a Turkish carpet") isolated in 6-foot-wide gravel walks (1.8 m).

Mollet's volume Théâtre des plans et jardinages, which contains autobiographical information, was published by his son in 1652, after his death. The manuscript was written many years before, about 1613–15, and revised over the years. A handsome calligraphic copy now at Dumbarton Oaks was dedicated to Louis XIII shortly before the King's death (1643).In it he acknowledged the influence upon him of Étienne Dupérac, the architect of Saint Germain-en-Laye.

Mollet states that Henry IV commissioned him to lay out the terraces at the new Château of Saint Germain-en-Laye in 1595 and thereafter at the Palace of Fontainebleau, and at Montceaux-en-Brie as well as at the Tuileries Garden, where he was in charge throughout his active career (Karling, p. 7) and where the central garden axis that he remade after depredations by soldiers in 1593 has been extended far to the west, as the axe historique of Paris.
