= Valerie Hepworth =

British charitable trustee

Valerie Hepworth (BEM) is a British charitable trustee. She was a founding member of the Yorkshire Gardens Trust and formerly served as Chairman of the Association of Gardens Trusts. Hepworth was awarded the British Empire Medal for services to the Yorkshire Gardens Trust in the 2019 Birthday Honours.
