= Château de Saint-Germain-en-Laye =

Former royal palace in Île-de-France, France

Coordinates: 48°53′53″N 2°05′47″E

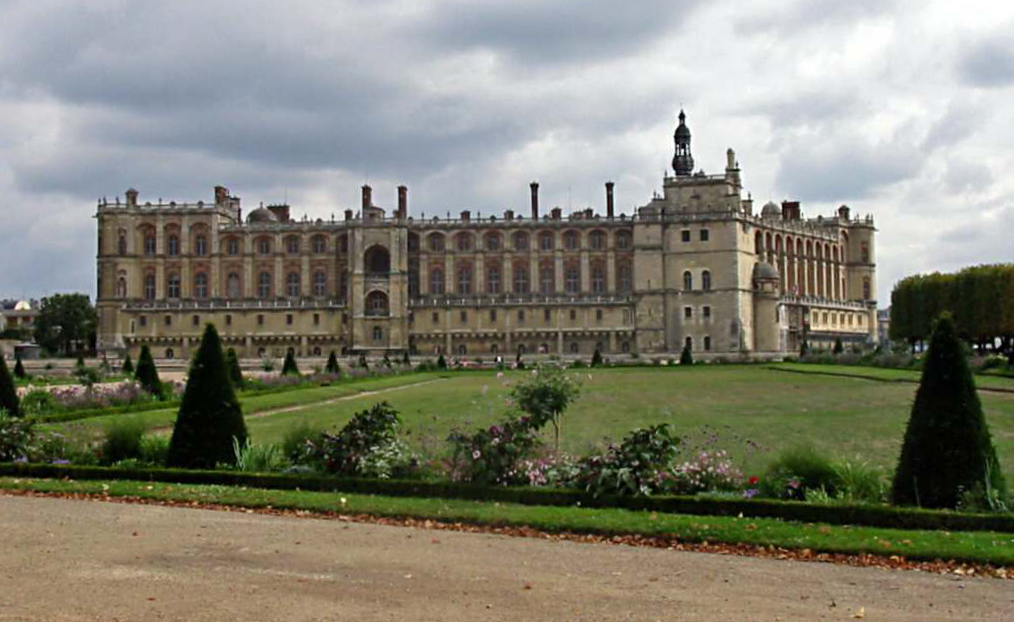

General information
- Location: Saint-Germain-en-Laye, France
- Construction started: 1124; 902 years ago

Design and construction
- Architect: Pierre Chambiges

The Château de Saint-Germain-en-Laye (French pronunciation: [ʃɑto d(ə) sɛ̃ ʒɛʁmɛ̃ ɑ̃ lɛ]) is a former royal palace in the commune of Saint-Germain-en-Laye, in the department of Yvelines, about 19 km west of Paris, France. Today, it houses the Musée d'Archéologie nationale (National Museum of Archaeology).

== History ==
=== 12th–13th centuries ===
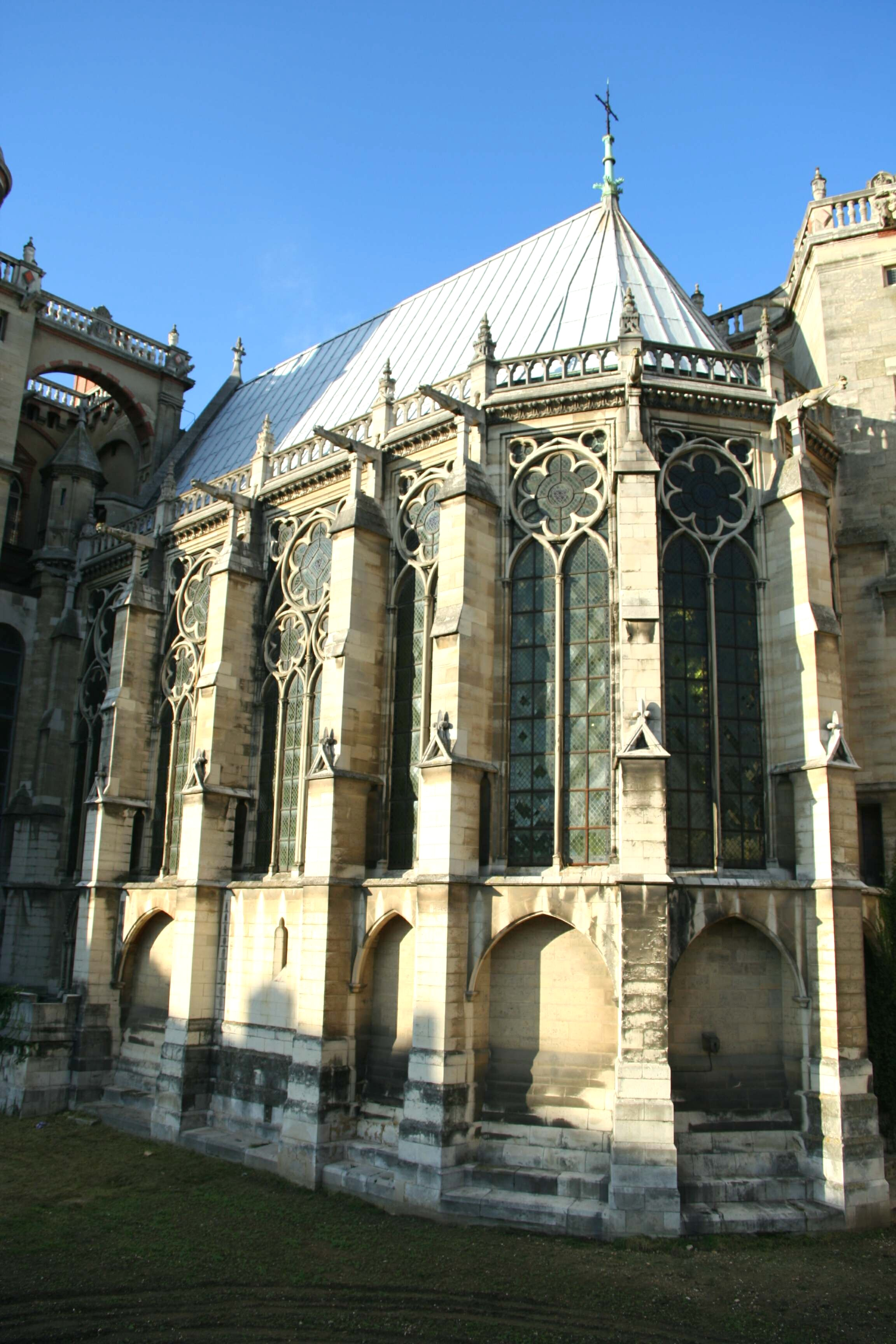
Sainte-Chapelle

The first castle, named the Grand Châtelet, was built on the site by Louis VI in 1124. The castle was expanded by Louis IX in the 1230s.

The Saint Louis chapel at the castle belongs to the Rayonnant phase of French Gothic architecture. A 1238 charter of Louis IX instituting a regular religious service at the chapel is the first mention of a chapel having been built at the royal castle. This was a Sainte Chapelle, to house a relic of the Crown of Thorns or the True Cross. Its plan and architecture prefigure the major Sainte-Chapelle which Louis built within the Palais de la Cité at Paris between 1240 and 1248. Both buildings were built by Louis's favourite architect Pierre de Montreuil, who adapted the architectural formulae invented at Saint Germain for use in Paris. A single nave ends in a chevet, with almost all the wall areas filled by tall narrow glass windows, between which are large exterior buttresses. The ogives of the vault rest on columns between the bays and the column bases are placed behind a low isolated arcade. The building can thus be open and empty of all internal supports. This large number of windows is also enabled by the pierre armée technique, with metal elements built into the structure of the walls to ensure the stones' stability. The west wall is adorned by a large Gothic rose window in the Rayonnant Gothic style. It was in this chapel in 1238 that Baldwin II of Constantinople presented Louis with the relic of the crown of thorns and, though they were intended for the Sainte-Chapelle in Paris, they were housed here until the Paris chapel was consecrated in April 1248.

The castle was burned by Edward the Black Prince in 1346; of it, only the Gothic chapel remains from the site's medieval phase. This Château Vieux was rebuilt by Charles V in the 1360s on the old foundations.

=== 16th–18th centuries ===
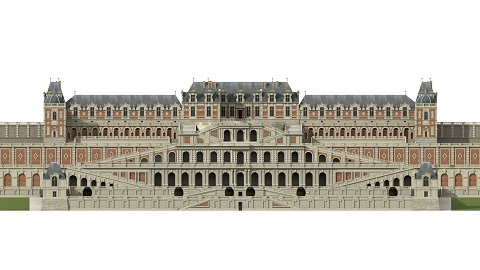
Château-Neuf de Saint-Germain-en-Laye, a new addition to the palace that was later demolished

The oldest parts of the current château were reconstructed by Francis I in 1539, and have subsequently been expanded several times. On 10 July 1547 a political rivalry came to a head in a legal duel here. Against the odds, Guy I de Chabot, 7th baron de Jarnac triumphed over François de Vivonne, seigneur de la Chasteigneraie, who died the next day after what was called "coup de Jarnac". In September 1548, rooms above the royal suite were refurbished for Mary, Queen of Scots and the children of Henry II of France.

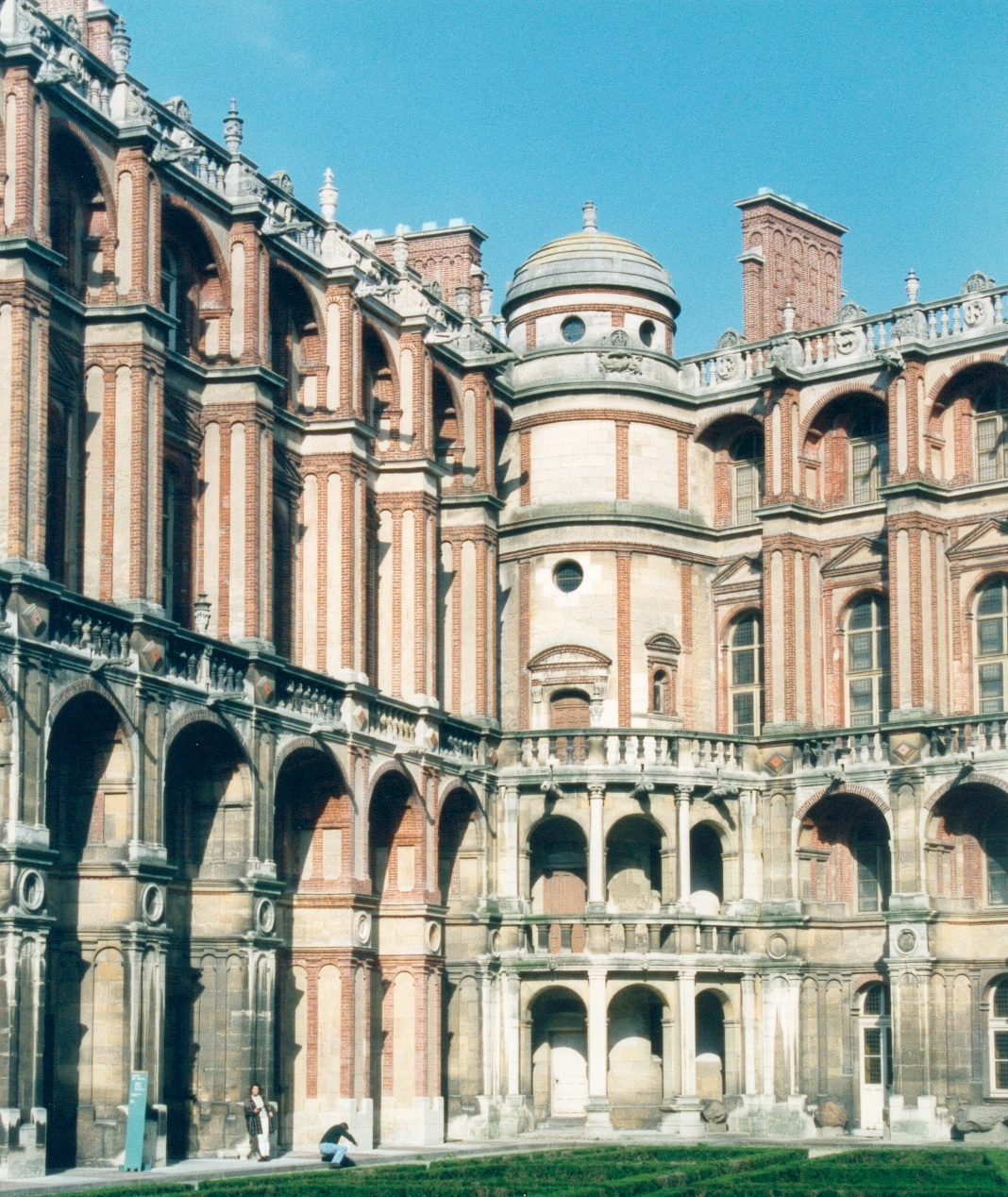
Staircase tower in the corner of the court

Henry II built a separate new château nearby, to designs by Philibert de l'Orme. It stood at the crest of a slope, which was shaped, under the direction of Étienne du Pérac into three massive descending terraces and narrower subsidiary mediating terraces, which were linked by divided symmetrical stairs and ramps and extended a single axis that finished at the edge of the Seine; the design took many cues from the Villa Lante at Bagnaia. "Étienne du Pérac had spent a long time in Italy, and one manifestation of his interest in gardens of this type is his well-known view of the Villa d'Este, engraved in 1573."

The gardens laid out at Saint-Germain-en-Laye were among a half-dozen gardens introducing the Italian garden style to France that laid the groundwork for the French formal garden. Unlike the parterres that were laid out in casual relation to existing châteaux, often on difficult sites originally selected for defensive reasons, these new gardens extended the central axis of a symmetrical building façade in rigorously symmetrical axial designs of patterned parterres, gravel walks, fountains and basins, and formally planted bosquets; they began the tradition that reached its apex after 1650 in the gardens of André Le Nôtre. According to Claude Mollet's Théâtre des plans et jardinage the parterres were laid out in 1595 for Henry IV by Claude Mollet, trained at Anet and the progenitor of a dynasty of royal gardeners. One of the parterre designs by Mollet at Saint-Germain-en-Laye was illustrated in Olivier de Serres' Le théâtre d'agriculture et mesnage des champs (1600), but the Château Neuf and the whole of its spectacular series of terraces can be fully seen in an engraving after Alexandre Francini, 1614.

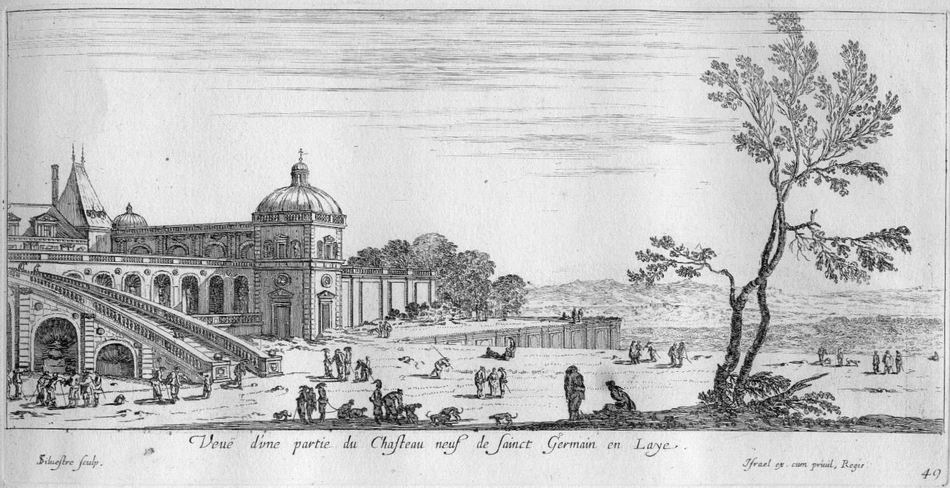
Silvestre's view of the uppermost terrace of the Château Neuf, shows (with artistic license) its neglected state.

Louis XIV was born at the Château Neuf in 1638. One of du Pérac's retaining walls collapsed in 1660, and Louis undertook a renovation of the gardens in 1662. At his majority he established his court here in 1666, but he preferred the Château Vieux: the Château Neuf was abandoned in the 1660s and demolished. From 1663 until 1682, when the King removed definitively to Versailles, the team that he inherited from the unfortunate Nicolas Fouquet—Louis Le Vau, Jules Hardouin-Mansart and André Le Nôtre laboured to give the ancient pile a more suitable aspect.

The gardens were remade by André Le Nôtre from 1669 to 1673, and include a 2.4 kilometre long stone terrace which provides a view over the valley of the Seine and, in the distance, Paris.

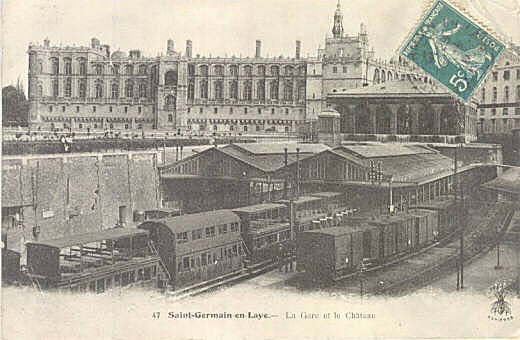
The Château is at the centre of the town of Saint-Germain-en-Laye, close by its RER A railway station.

Louis XIV turned the château over to King James II of England after his exile from Britain in the Glorious Revolution of 1688. King James lived in the château for thirteen years, and his daughter Louise-Marie Stuart was born in exile here in 1692. King James lies buried in the nearby Church of Saint-Germain; his wife Mary of Modena remained at the château until her death in 1718. Their son James left the château in 1716, ultimately settling in Rome. Many Jacobites—supporters of the exiled Stuarts—remained at the château until the French Revolution, leaving in 1793. The Jacobites often consisted of former members of the Jacobite court, and the apartments left empty in the château by the Jacobite court pensioners upon their death, were often passed down to their widows and children by the caretaker of the château, Adrien Maurice de Noailles, 3rd Duke of Noailles. The Jacobite colony at Saint-Germain was still dominant in the 1750s, when they were however treated with increasing hostility. After the death of the Duke of Noailles in 1766, who had been responsible for the continuing Jacobite dominance because of his preference to give rooms to Jacobites, the British dominance quickly decreased and more French inhabitants were given lodgings in the château: the last member of the Stuart court was Theresa O'Connel, who died in 1778. The last descendants of the British Jacobites, by then mostly bearing French names, were evicted when the building was confiscated by the government during the French revolution in 1793.

=== 19th–21st centuries ===
In the 19th century, Napoleon I established his cavalry officers' training school here. Napoleon III initiated restoration of the castle by Eugène Millet, starting in 1862. It became the Musée des Antiquités Nationales (National Museum of Antiquities) in 1867, displaying the archeological objects of France. Auguste Lafollye took over responsibility for the restoration on Millet's death in 1879, continuing until 1889. His goal, and that of his successor Honoré Daumet, was to restore the French Renaissance style of Francis I.

On September 10, 1919 the Treaty of Saint-Germain-en-Laye, ending hostilities between the Allies of World War I and Austria, was signed at the château.

During the German occupation (1940–44), the château served as the headquarters of the German Army in France.

The museum was renamed the Musée d'Archéologie Nationale in 2005. Its collections include finds from the Paleolithic to the Merovingian periods.

== Gallery ==
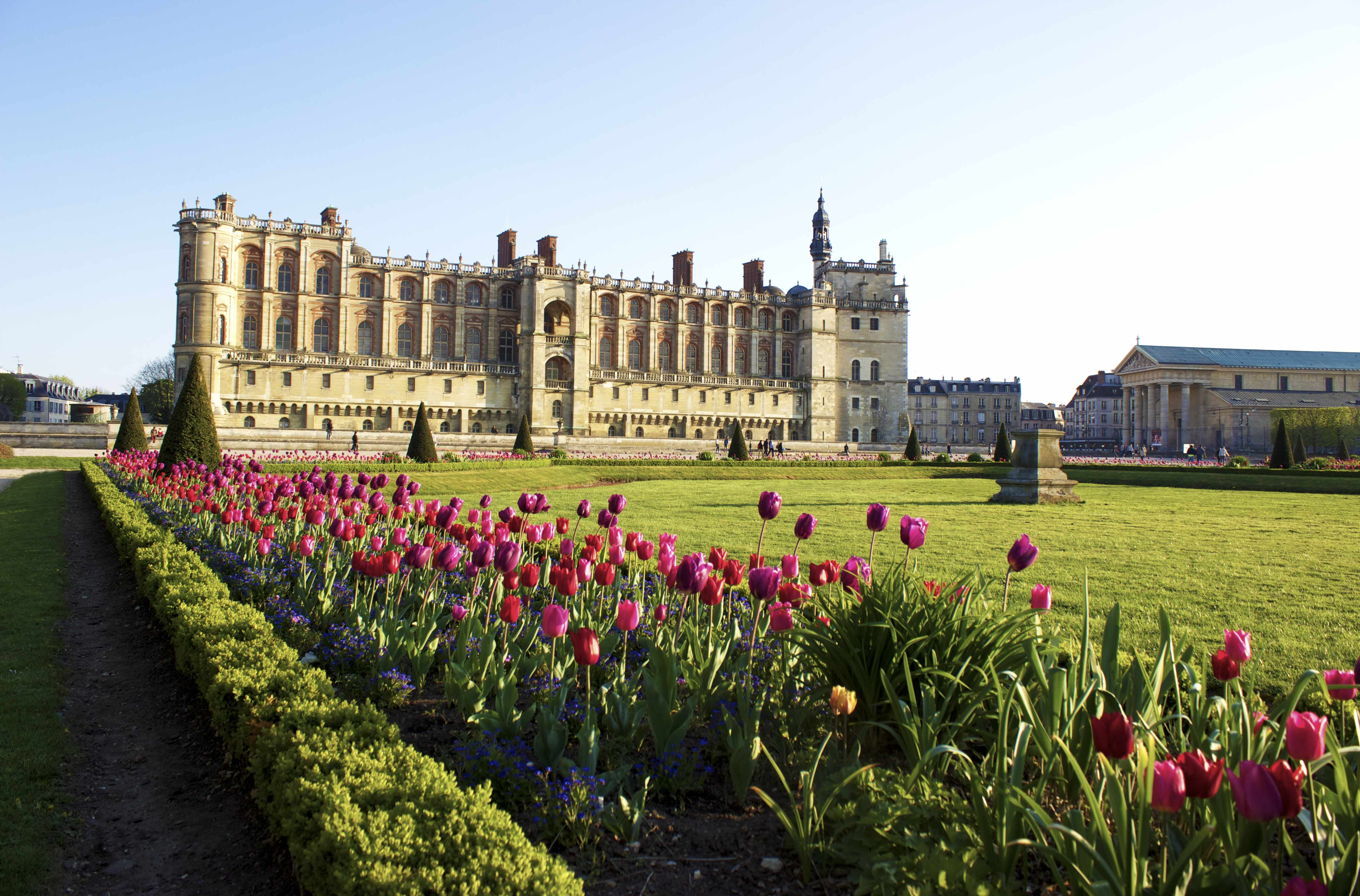
The palace as seen from the gardens

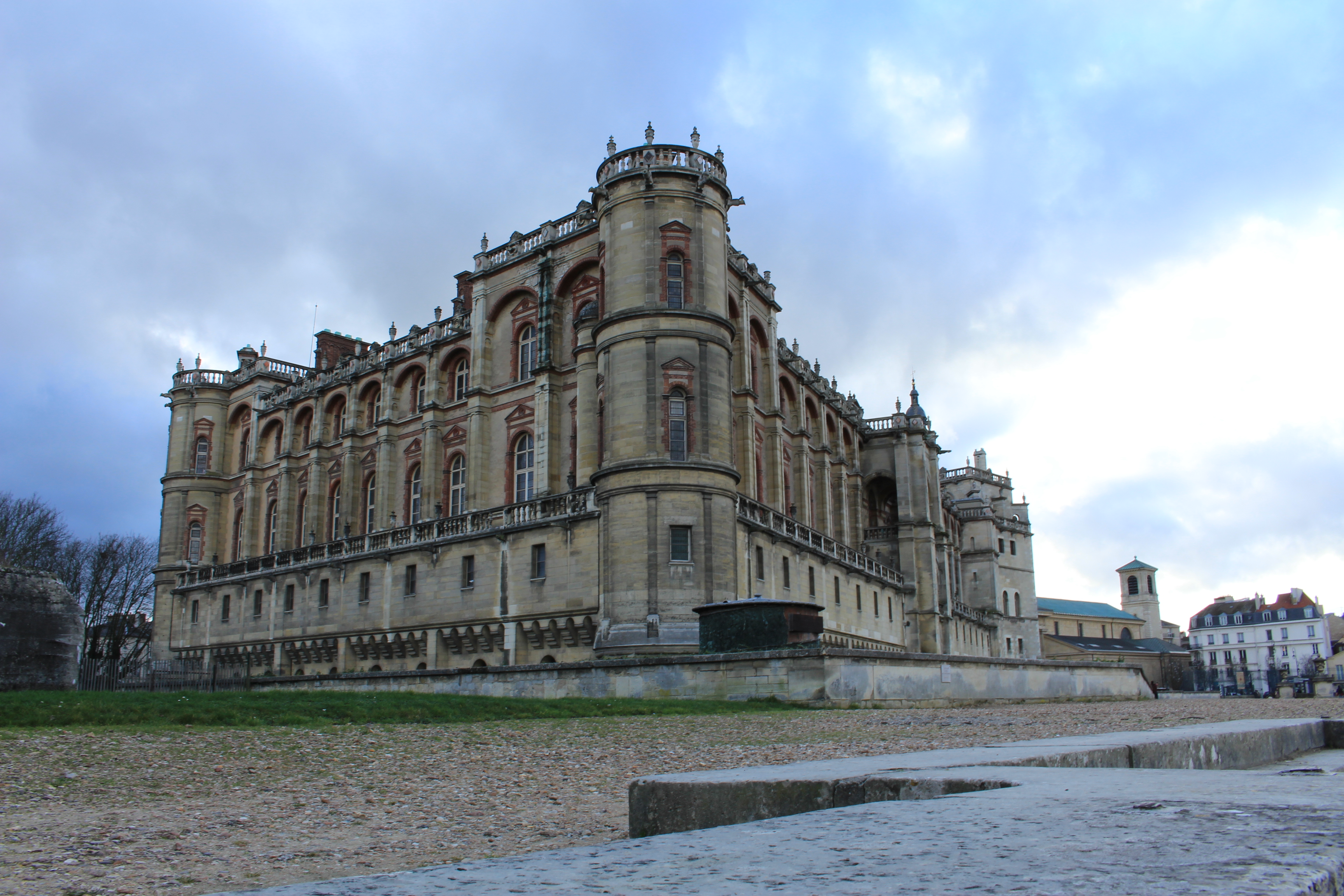
Angle view of the palace

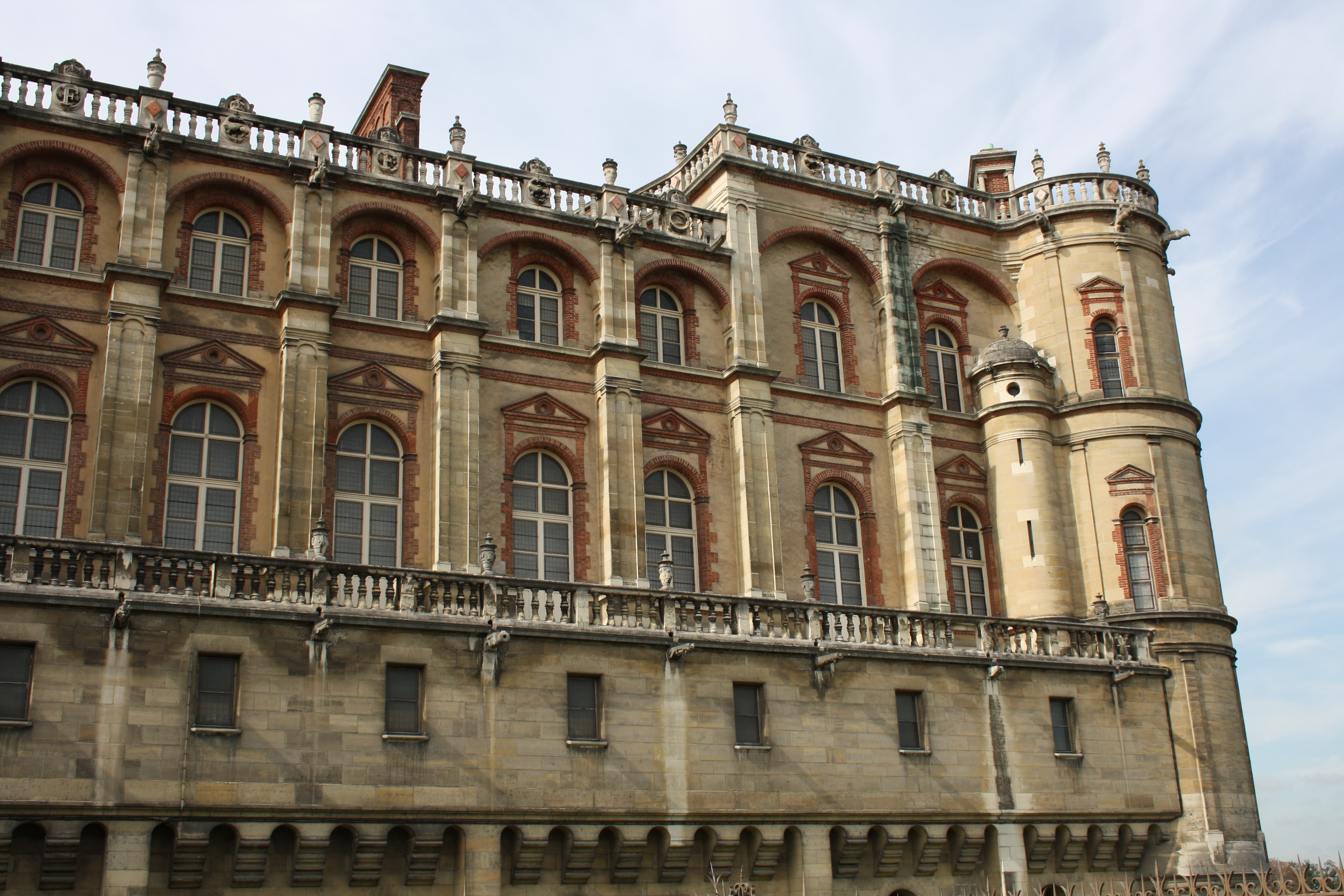
Details of the palace's façade

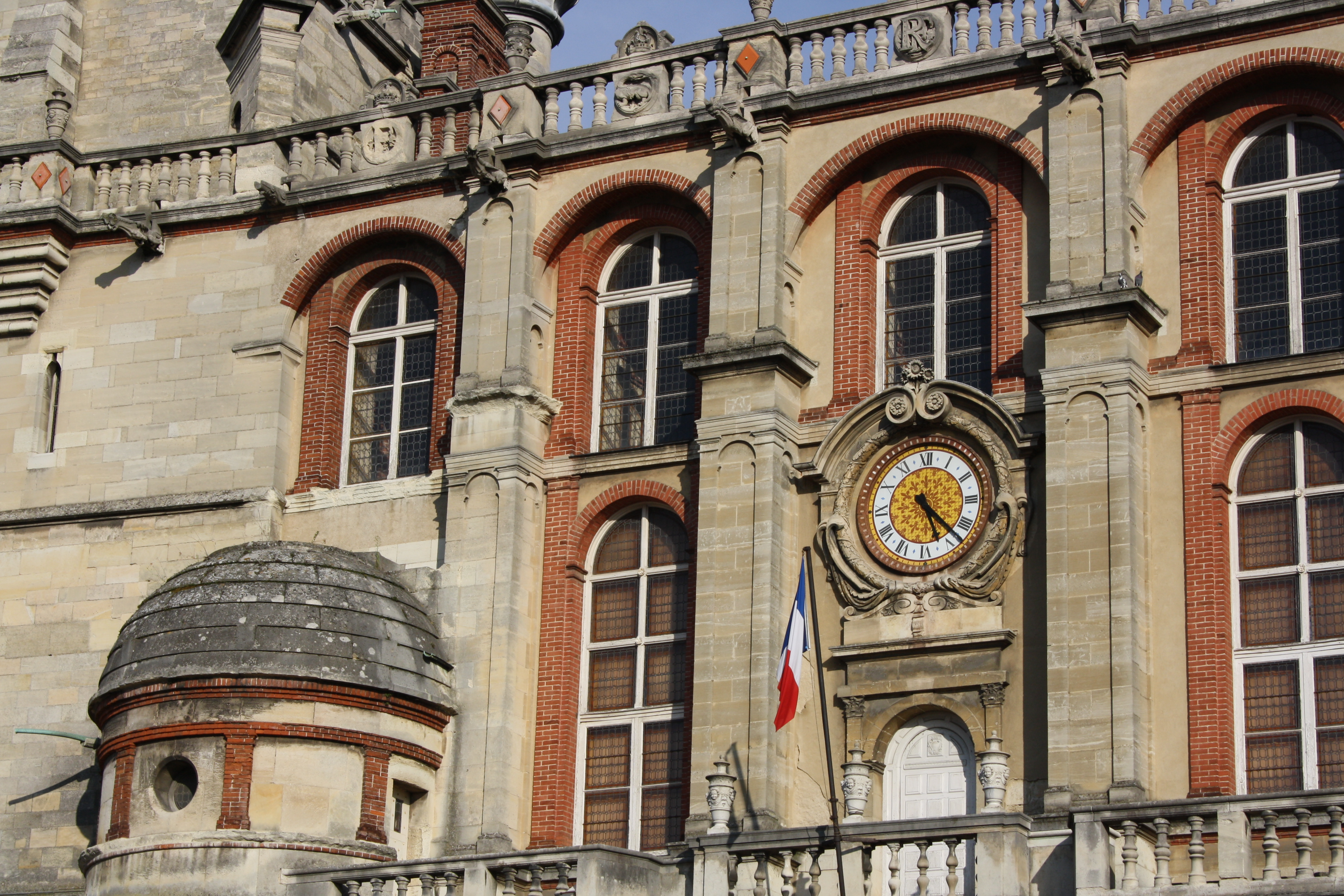
The entrance of the palace

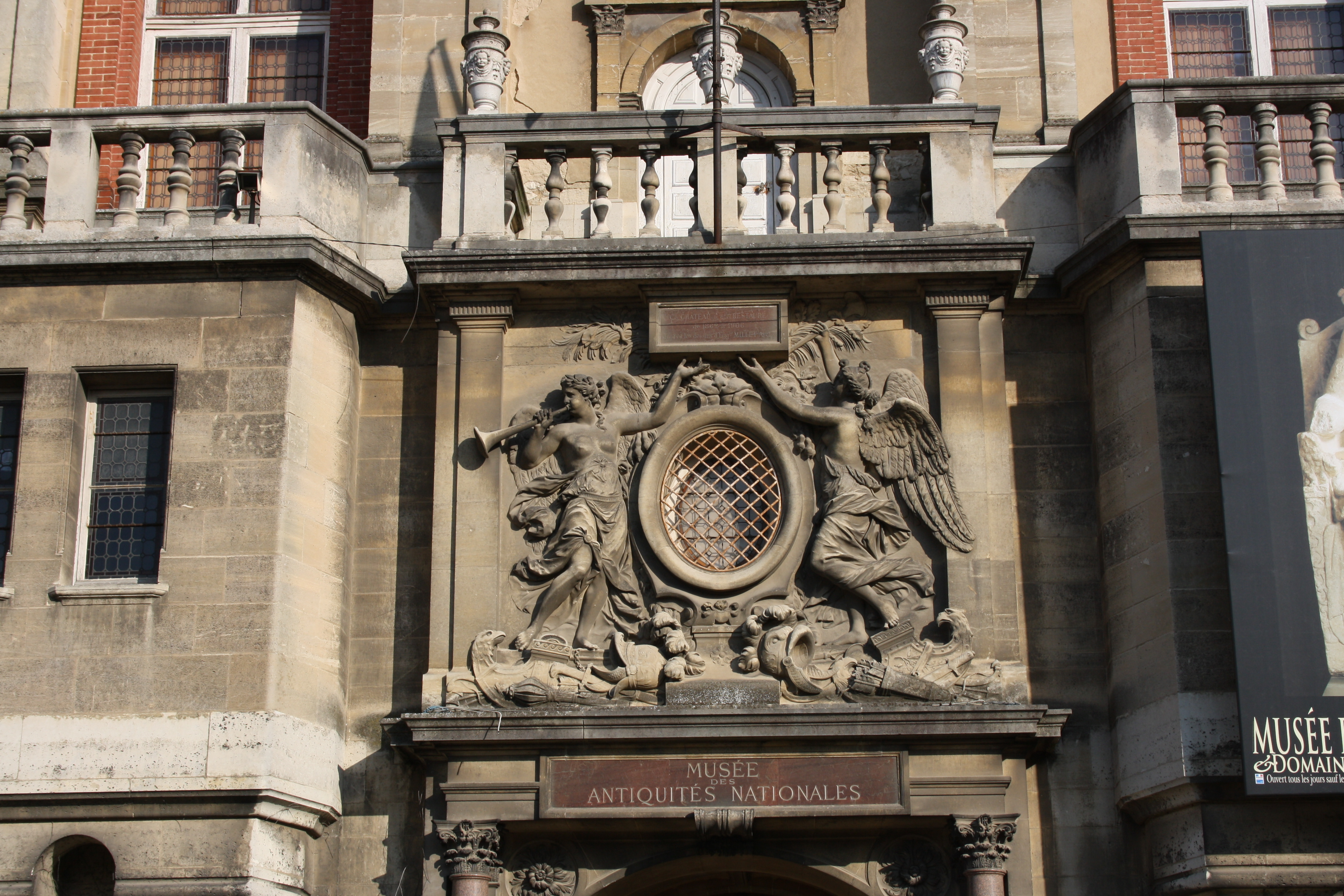
The entrance of the museum

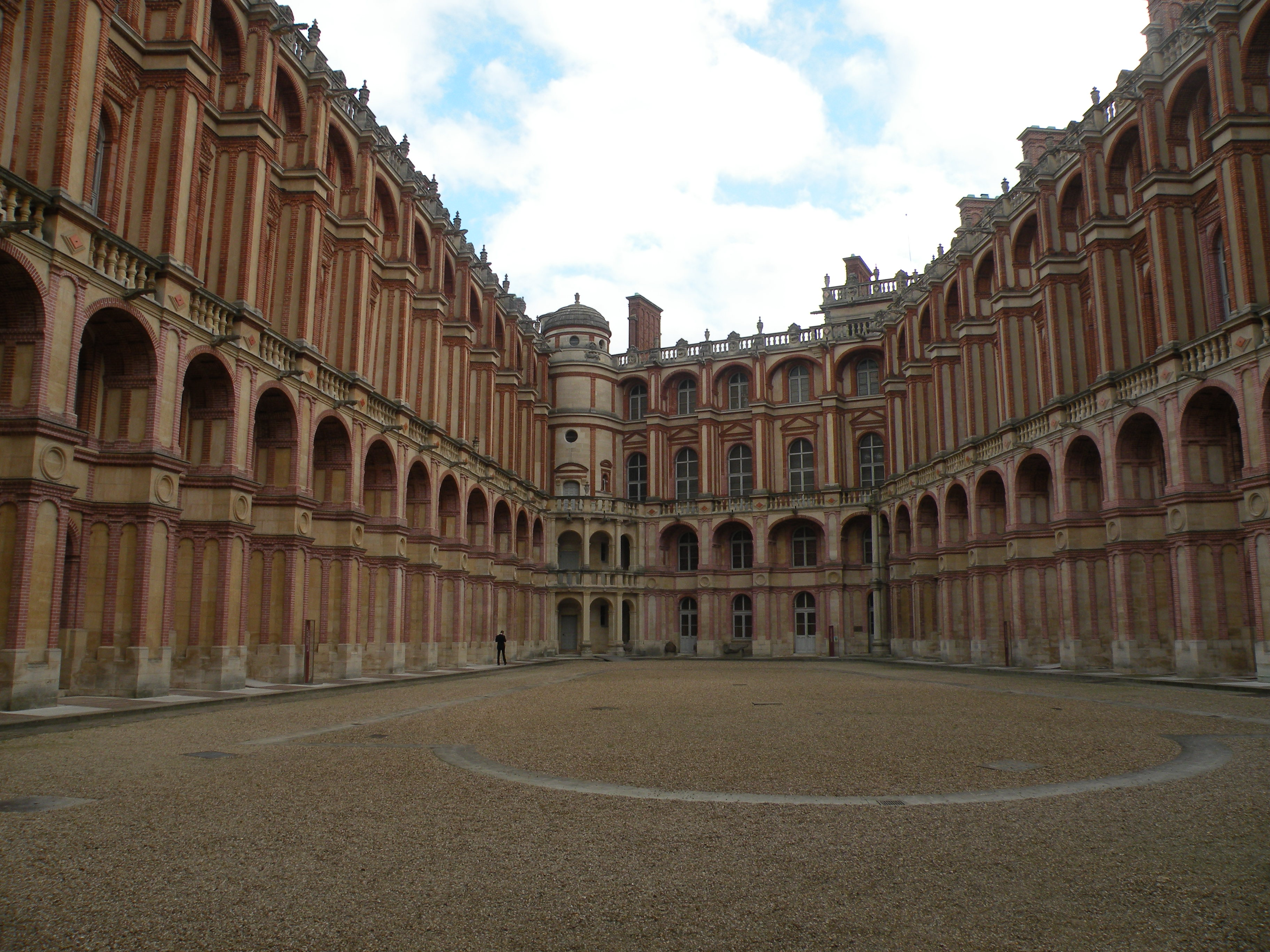
The inner courtyard

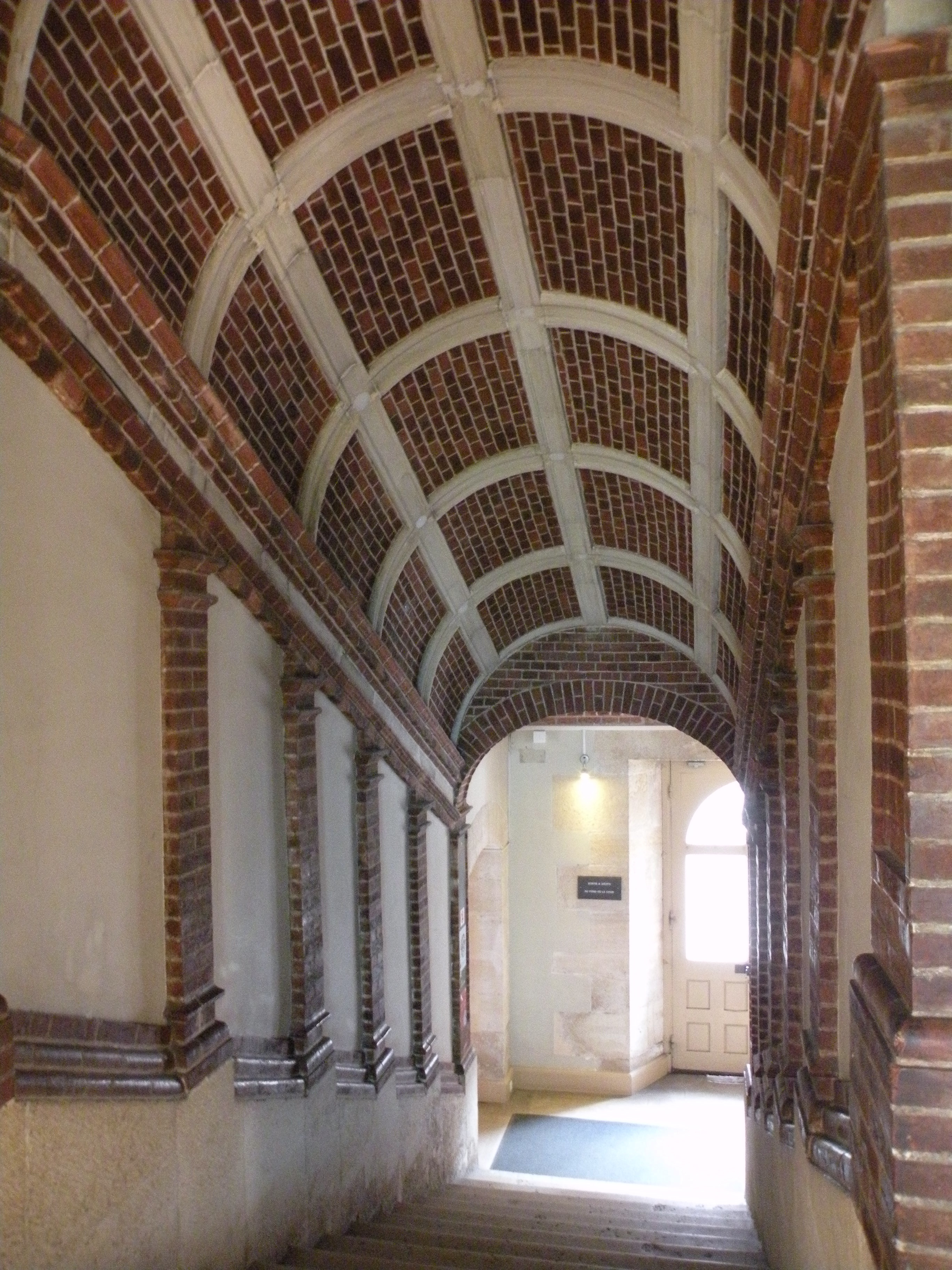
One of the staircases

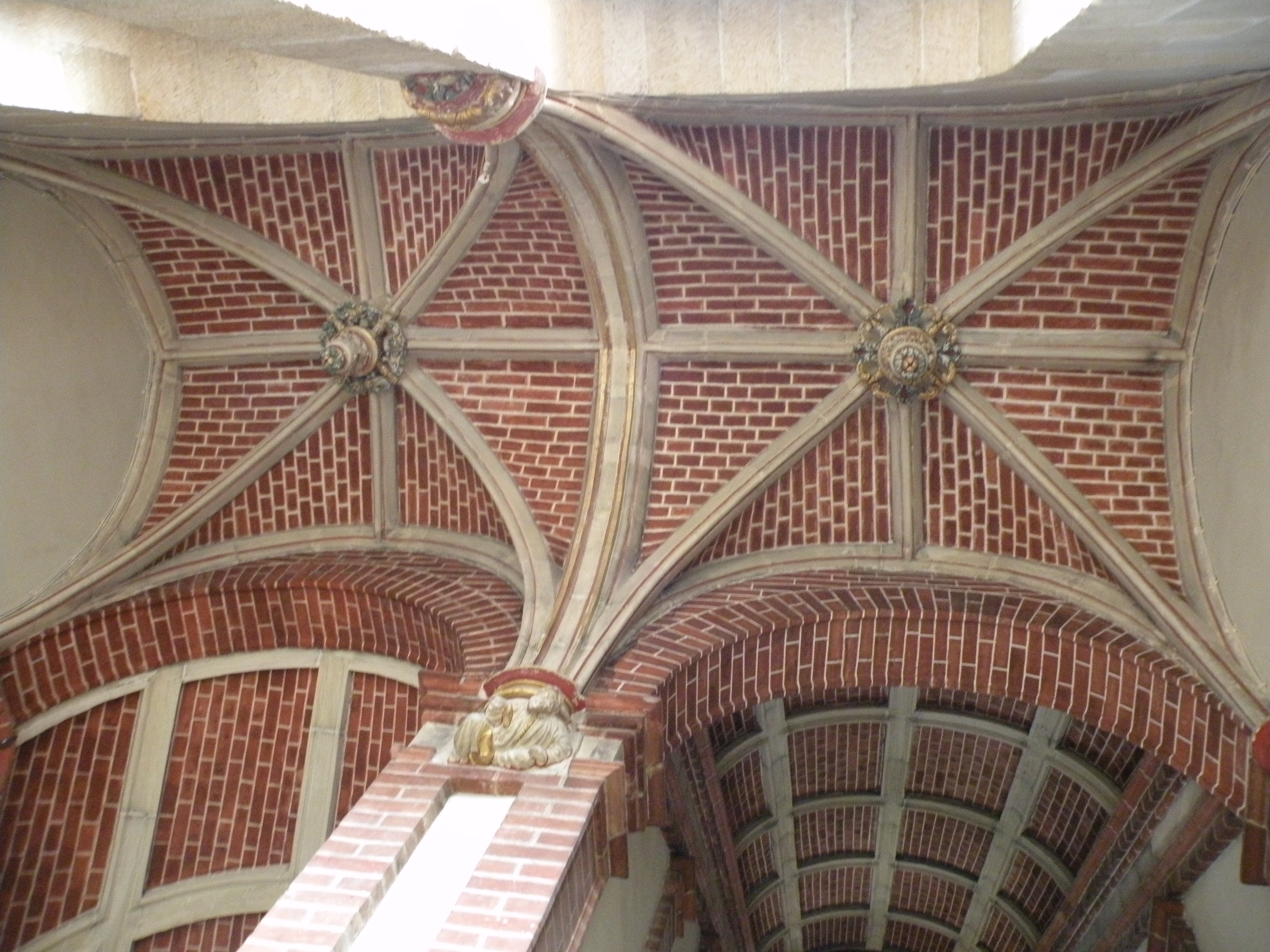
The inner ceilings
