= Yorkshire Gardens Trust =

Gardens charity in Yorkshire, England

- Formation: 1996
- Registration no.: Charity ID: 1060697
- Legal status: Charity
- Headquarters: Osbaldwick, York
- Location: England
- Members: 350
- Parent organization: Gardens Trust
- Website: www.yorkshiregardenstrust.org.uk

The Yorkshire Gardens Trust is a cultural heritage charity, founded in 1996, which aims to conserve and promote garden heritage in Yorkshire. It is an independent charity and one of the county garden trusts operating under the Gardens Trust. One of the founders, Valerie Hepworth was awarded the British Empire Medal for services to the Trust in the 2019 Birthday Honours.

== See also ==
- London Gardens Trust
