= Australian Garden History Society =

Australian history society

The Australian Garden History Society (AGHS) is an Australian history society dedicated to the study of Australian garden history and the conservation of significant landscapes and historic gardens. It was formed in 1980.

There are AGHS branches in most states, and the national headquarters of the society is in Melbourne, Victoria. Membership of the group increased during the 1980s and 1990s peaking at over 2,000 at the turn of the 21st century. The society publishes a journal called Australian Garden History and hosts an annual conference which combines the reading of academic papers with garden visits. The organisation has a web site that includes news items and a list of events.

Notable publications produced by the group include: The Oxford Companion to Australian Gardens published by the AGHS in association with Oxford University Press in 2002. A history of the society, Visions and Voices, was published in 2006.

== See also ==
- Gardening in Australia
- Garden History Society
- Historic garden conservation
