= André Mollet =

French garden designer

André Mollet (died before 16 June 1665) was a French garden designer, the son of Claude Mollet—gardener to three French kings—and the grandson of Jacques Mollet, gardener at the château d'Anet, where Italian formal gardening was introduced to France.

== Royal appointment ==
André Mollet became royal gardener to Queen Christina in Stockholm. His lasting record is his handsomely-printed folio, Le Jardin de plaisir ("The Pleasure Garden") , Stockholm 1651, which he illustrated with meticulous copperplate engravings after his own designs, and which, with an eye to a European aristocratic clientele, he published in Swedish, French and German. In his designs the rich patterning of parterres, which had formerly been a garden feature of interest in isolation, was for the first time arranged in significant relation to the plan of the house. Mollet's designs coordinated the elements of scythed turf—making its debut here as an essential element of garden design—with gravel paths, basins and fountains, parterres, bosquets and allées.

== Summoned to England ==
Mollet was summoned to England in the 1620s to lay out gardens for Charles I of England and Henrietta Maria at St James's Palace, and he later published his design for the parterres of the privy garden in his Le jardin de plaisir. Mollet was perhaps the designer of parterres at Wilton House. Henrietta Maria was Mollet's main patron, and she sent him back to France to her mother Marie de' Medici with a request for fruit trees and flowers.

By 1633 he was in the service of Prince Frederick Henry of Orange, for whom he laid out parterres en broderie that included the lion rampant of the prince's coat-of-arms, in turf and clipped boxwood, set in colored gravels at Huis Honselaarsdijk, and at the prince's other main residence, Huis ter Nieuwburg near Rijswijk.

== Return to France ==
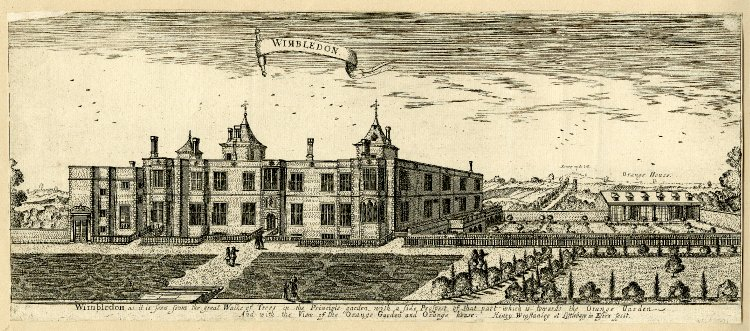
Garden view, south elevation of Wimbledon Palace. 1678 Engraving by Henry Winstanley

Mollet returned to France in 1635, but he was back in England by 1642, when he was designing gardens for Queen Henrietta-Maria at Wimbledon Palace. The house and gardens were described in a survey made in November 1649. His work included the Orange Garden, divided into four knots with an Orange House. A richly decorated room with a tiled floor "below stairs" in the service quarters of the main house, known as the "lower Spanish room", was used by the gardeners to plant orange and pomegranate trees in boxes.

Mollet presumably returned to France after the outbreak of the English Civil War later that year, and dropped from sight. In the autumn of 1646, a Swedish delegation arrived in Paris, led by Christina's favourite, the connoisseur Magnus Gabriel De la Gardie, who was so pleased with recent French developments in the art of gardens that he engaged Mollet for the queen on the spot. Mollet took on two assistants and provided himself with orange and lemon trees and pomegranates, with myrtle, laurel trees and Spanish jasmine, all of which were tender and destined for an orangerie. He also procured tulip bulbs and ranunculus roots. Then there was a frustrating delay of a full season before the official confirmation arrived.

== Sweden ==
Mollet's stay in Sweden lasted five years, during which he introduced to Sweden the French parterres en broderie patterned like Baroque textiles. He modernized the existing gardens linked to the royal palace in Stockholm and laid out a new garden in the outskirts of Stockholm on the site of a former hop-garden, the Humlegården. The introduction of a Baroque garden style in Sweden dates to this decade, with the encouragement of progressive Francophile architects like Nicodemus Tessin the Elder and Jean de la Vallée, with whom Mollet had worked in Holland, together with the eager commissions from Swedish nobles that Mollet received. The results are documented in Erik Dahlbergh's topographical Suecia antiqua et hodierna. Though Mollet left Sweden in 1653, his son Jean Mollet remained in Sweden for the rest of his life, and Médard Gue, one of André Mollet's original French assistants, assumed an independent role in Swedish gardening.

Soon Mollet was in London, whence he received a passport to travel abroad once more in 1653. With the English Restoration in 1660, conditions for ambitious garden-building were once more propitious, and Mollet was listed as a royal gardener, gardener-in-chief for St. James's Park. An English edition of Le Jardin de plaisir appeared in London in 1670, as The Pleasure Garden.

Mollet's brother, the younger Claude Mollet, was passed over in favour of André Le Nôtre as chief gardener at the Palace of the Tuileries, in 1649.

== See also ==
Mollet's French predecessors in the art of gardening:

- Charles Estienne
- Jean Liebault
- Olivier de Serres
- Jacques Boyceau
- Garden à la française
