= London Open Gardens =

Annual open garden event in London

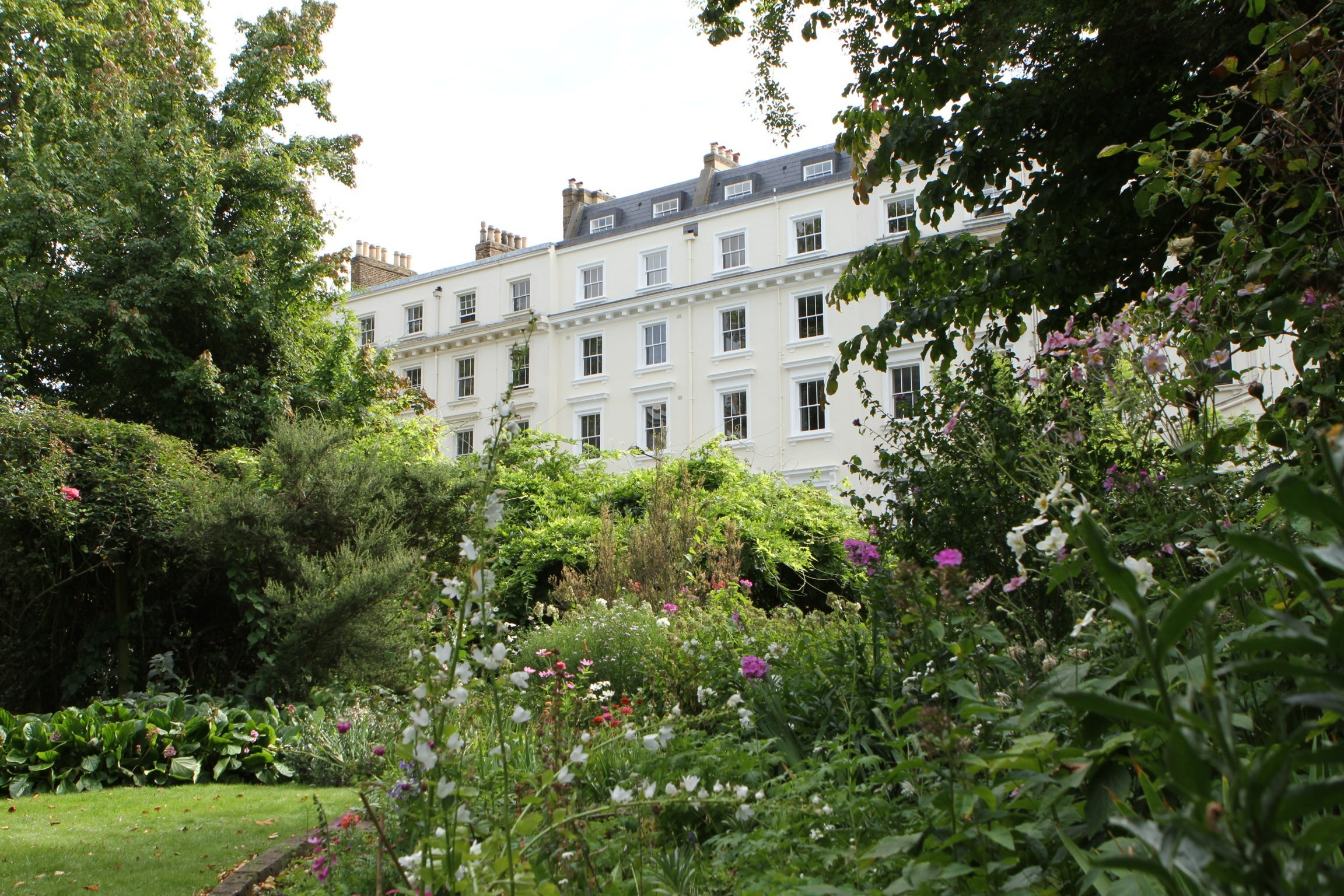
- The private gardens of Eccleston Square are opened for the event
- Status: Active
- Location: London
- Country: England
- Inaugurated: 1998; 28 years ago
- Most recent: 2026
- Next event: June 2027
- Organiser: London Parks and Gardens

London Open Gardens or London Open Gardens Weekend is an annual event held over a weekend in June each year by the London Parks and Gardens charity.

== History ==
The event was originally an open day for squares in London first run in 1998. By 2004 it had become a weekend event known as Open Garden Squares Weekend. It has occurred every year since and taking place in June. The event aims to build a greater appreciation for gardens, green spaces and horticulture among the public. It gives members of the public an opportunity to visit usually closed private gardens via ticketed access.

== Participants ==
Gardens that participate in the event include many garden squares which are characteristic of London's urban environment and inspired the original creation of the initiative. The event also includes residential rooftop gardens and mansion gardens, with a total of more than 100 gardens participating.
