= St James's Park =

Royal Park in central London

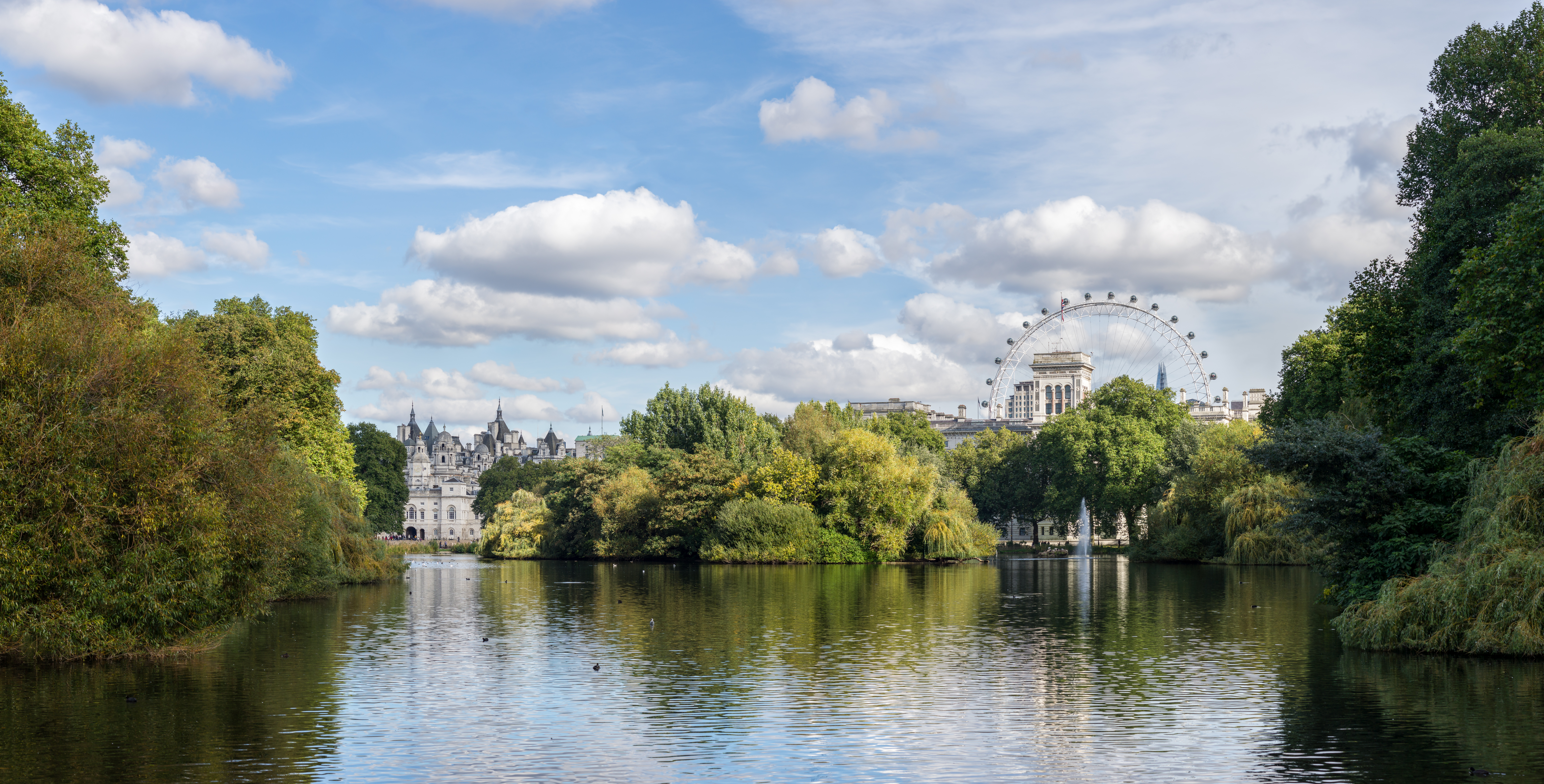
- Looking east from the Blue Bridge towards Horse Guards

- Location within City of Westminster
- Location: London, SW1; United Kingdom
- Coordinates: 51°30′09″N 00°08′06″W
- Area: 23 hectares (57 acres)
- Established: 1603
- Operator: The Royal Parks
- Public transit: St James's Park, Green Park, Victoria, and Westminster tube stations

St James's Park is a 23-hectare (57-acre) urban park in the City of Westminster, central London. A Royal Park, it is at the southernmost end of the St James's area, which was named after a once isolated medieval hospital dedicated to St James the Less, later the site of St James's Palace. The area was initially enclosed for a deer park near the Palace of Whitehall for King Henry VIII in the 1530s. It is the most easterly of a near-continuous chain of public parks that includes (moving westward) Green Park, Hyde Park, and Kensington Gardens.

It includes The Mall to the north, and is bounded by Buckingham Palace to the west, Horse Guards to the east, and Birdcage Walk to the south. It meets Green Park at Queen's Gardens with the Victoria Memorial at its centre, opposite the entrance to Buckingham Palace. St James's Palace is on the opposite side of The Mall. The closest London Underground stations are St James's Park, Green Park, Victoria, and Westminster.

The park is Grade I listed on the Register of Historic Parks and Gardens.

== Features ==
Audio description of St James's park by Alison Steadman.

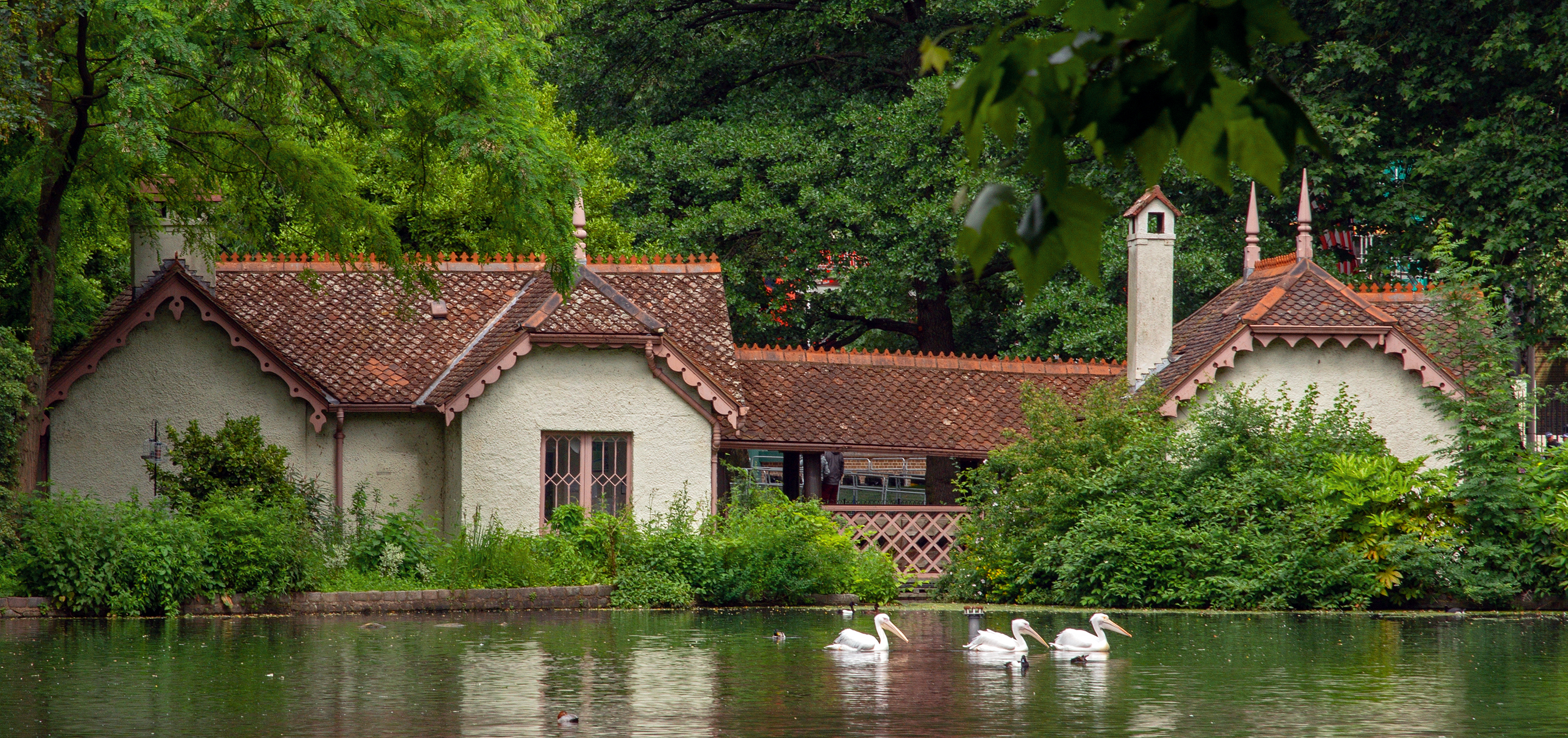
Duck Island Cottage has a long history and is now the headquarters for the London Parks & Gardens Trust

The park has a small lake, St James's Park Lake, with two islands, West Island and Duck Island, the latter named for the lake's collection of waterfowl. At the end of the nineteenth century Duck Island was considered a sufficiently remote location for Scotland Yard to establish a bomb disposal facility there; the resident bird-keeper was given the responsibility of looking after the implements kept for dismantling the devices. It now houses pumps and water treatment machinery for the lake and fountains.

A resident colony of pelicans has been a feature of the park since a Russian ambassador donated them to Charles II in 1664. While most of the birds' wings are clipped, there is a pelican which can be seen flying, occasionally beyond the confines of the Park; the colony is also famous for its members occasionally hunting and eating other birds in the park, including moorhens and pigeons. The pelicans hatched chicks for the first time in the park's history in 2026.

The Blue Bridge across the lake affords a tree-framed view west towards Buckingham Palace. Looking east, the view includes the Swire Fountain to the north of Duck Island and, past the lake, the grounds of Horse Guards Parade, with Horse Guards, the Old War Office and Whitehall Court behind. To the south of Duck Island is the Tiffany Fountain on Pelican Rock; and past the lake is the Foreign, Commonwealth and Development Office, with the London Eye, the Shell Tower, and the Shard behind. The park has a children's playground including a large sandpit.

The species of trees in the park include London planes, Scarlet oak, black mulberry, and a fig tree.

== History ==
In 1532, Henry VIII purchased from Eton College an area of marshland through which the Tyburn flowed. It lay to the west of York Place acquired by Henry from Cardinal Wolsey; it was purchased in order to turn York Place, subsequently renamed Whitehall, into a dwelling fit for a king. Henry enclosed the park for deer hunting and built St James Palace to initially serve as his hunting lodge. On James I's accession to the throne in 1603, he ordered that the park be drained and landscaped, and exotic animals were kept in the park, including camels, crocodiles, an elephant and exotic birds, kept in aviaries.

While Charles II was in exile in France under the Commonwealth of England, he was impressed by the elaborate gardens at French royal palaces, and on his ascension he had the park redesigned in a more formal style, probably by the French landscaper André Mollet. A 775-metre by 38-metre (850 by 42-yard) ornamental canal was created as evidenced in the old plan. The king opened the park to the public and used the area to entertain guests and mistresses, such as Nell Gwyn. The park became notorious at the time as a meeting place for impromptu acts of lechery, as described by John Wilmot, 2nd Earl of Rochester in his poem "A Ramble in St James's Park".

In the late 17th and early 18th centuries cows grazed on the park, and milk could be bought fresh at the "Lactarian", described by Zacharias Conrad von Uffenbach in 1710. The 18th century saw further changes, including the reclamation of part of the canal for Horse Guards Parade and the purchase of Buckingham House (now Buckingham Palace) at the west end of the Mall, for the use of Queen Charlotte in 1761. The park, adjacent to the grounds of Carlton House, was a principal venue for the Grand Jubilee of 1814 on 1 August, celebrating the centenary of the Hanoverian succession and peace with France. John Nash designed a Chinese-style bridge and seven-storey pagoda across the canal; the pagoda caught fire during the firework display, killing at least one man, though the bridge survived until 1825.

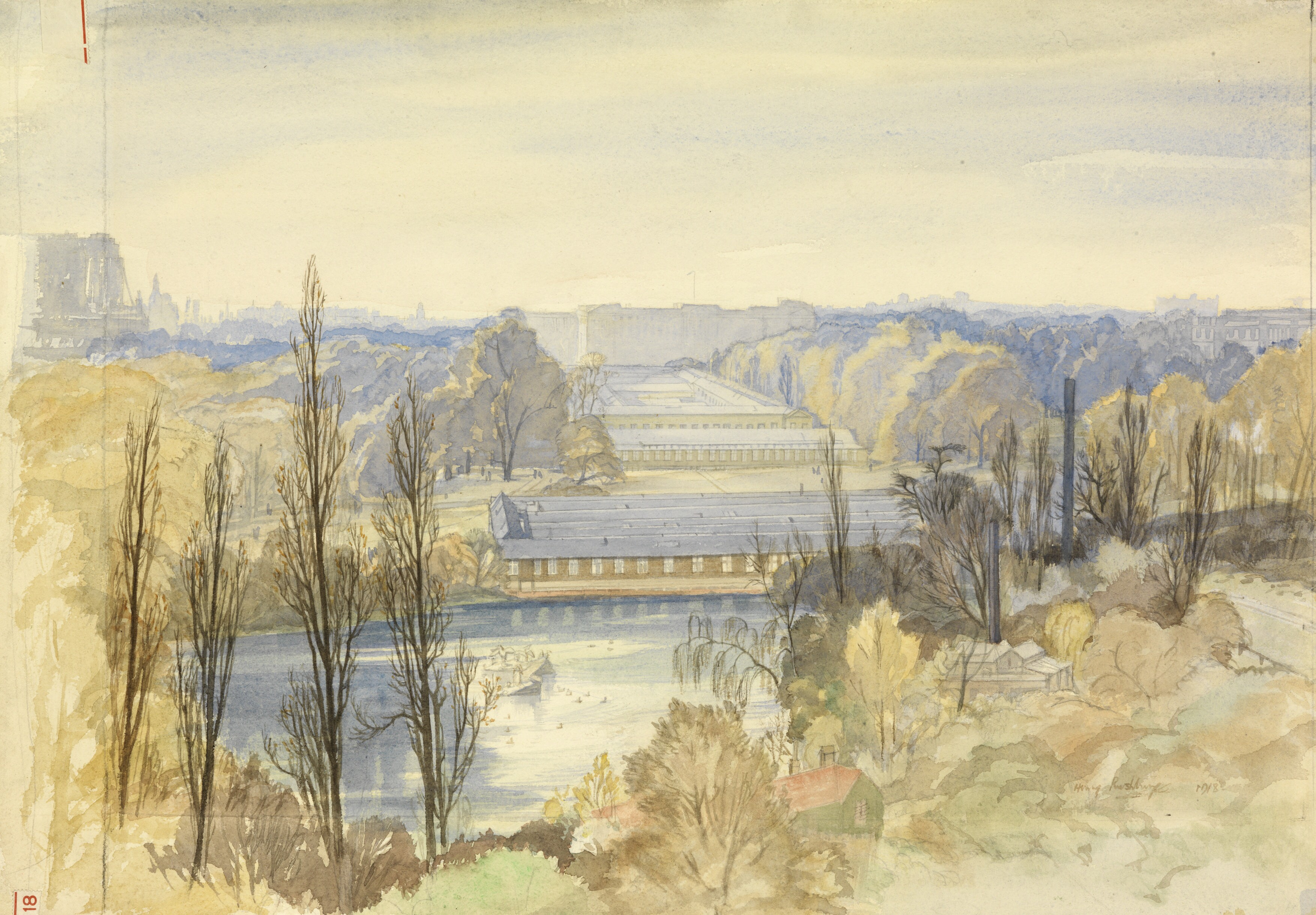
Temporary government buildings on St James's Park, First World War, by Henry Rushbury

Further remodelling in 1826–27, commissioned by the Prince Regent (later George IV) and overseen by the architect and landscaper John Nash, saw the canal's conversion into a more naturally-shaped lake, and formal avenues rerouted to romantic winding pathways. At the same time, Buckingham House was expanded to create the palace, and Marble Arch was built at its entrance, whilst The Mall was turned into a grand processional route. It opened to public traffic 60 years later in 1887. The arch was moved to its current location at the junction of Oxford Street and Park Lane in 1851 and the Victoria Memorial was erected between 1906 and 1911.

During World War I, the lake was temporarily drained and the park housed newly-built offices for the expanded civil service, which were dismantled after the war concluded.

The national memorial to Elizabeth II will be constructed in the park, designed by Norman Foster.

== Gallery ==
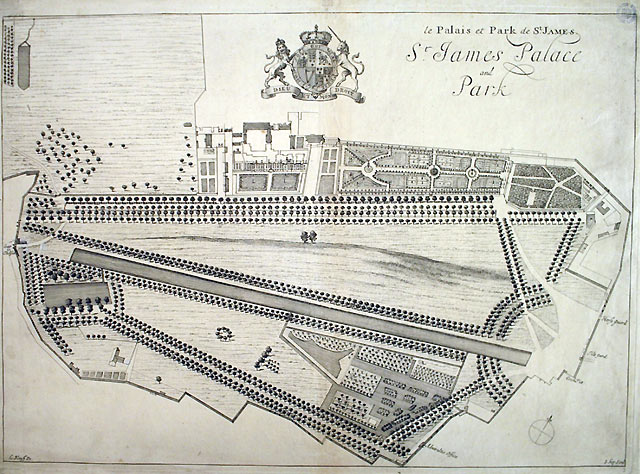
André Mollet's design for the park in Charles II's time, before 18th and 19th century remodelling, which shaped a more natural-looking lake from the straight canal visible here, the eastern part of which was filled in to create Horse Guards Parade

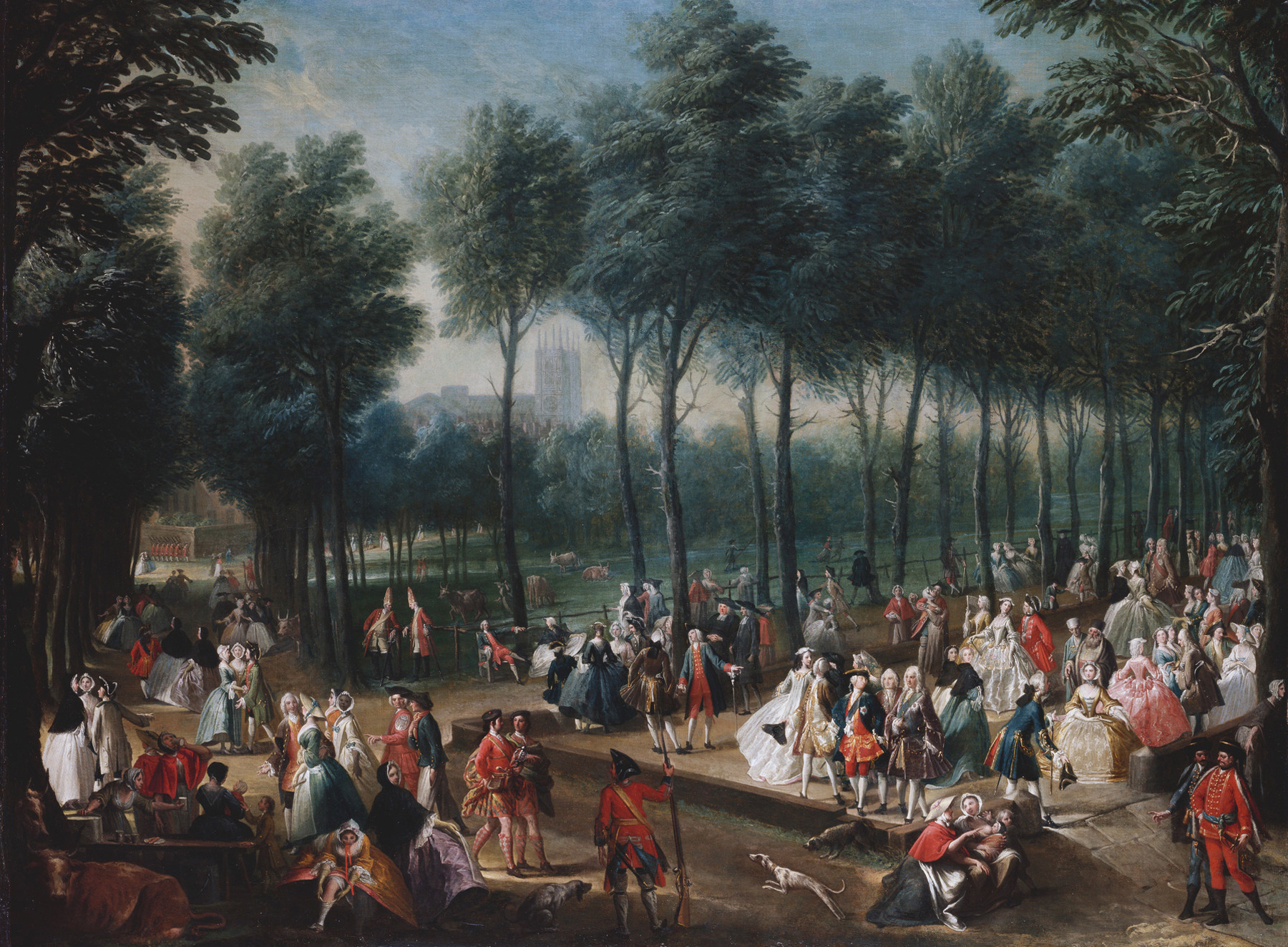
Fashionable people thronging St James's Park, c. 1745

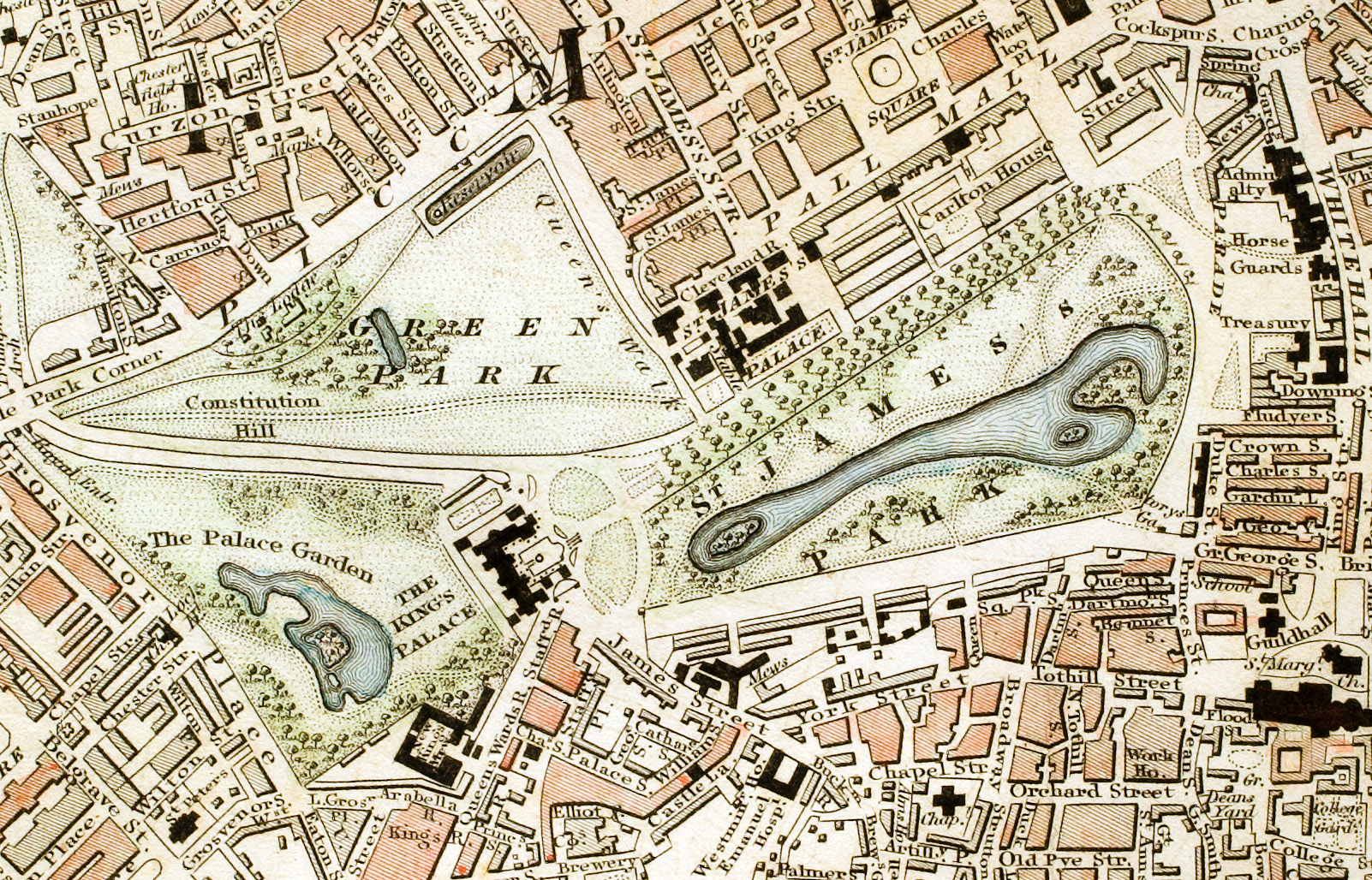
Green Park and St James's Park c. 1833

Visitors at St James's Park Lake, c. 1837, depicted in The Penny Magazine

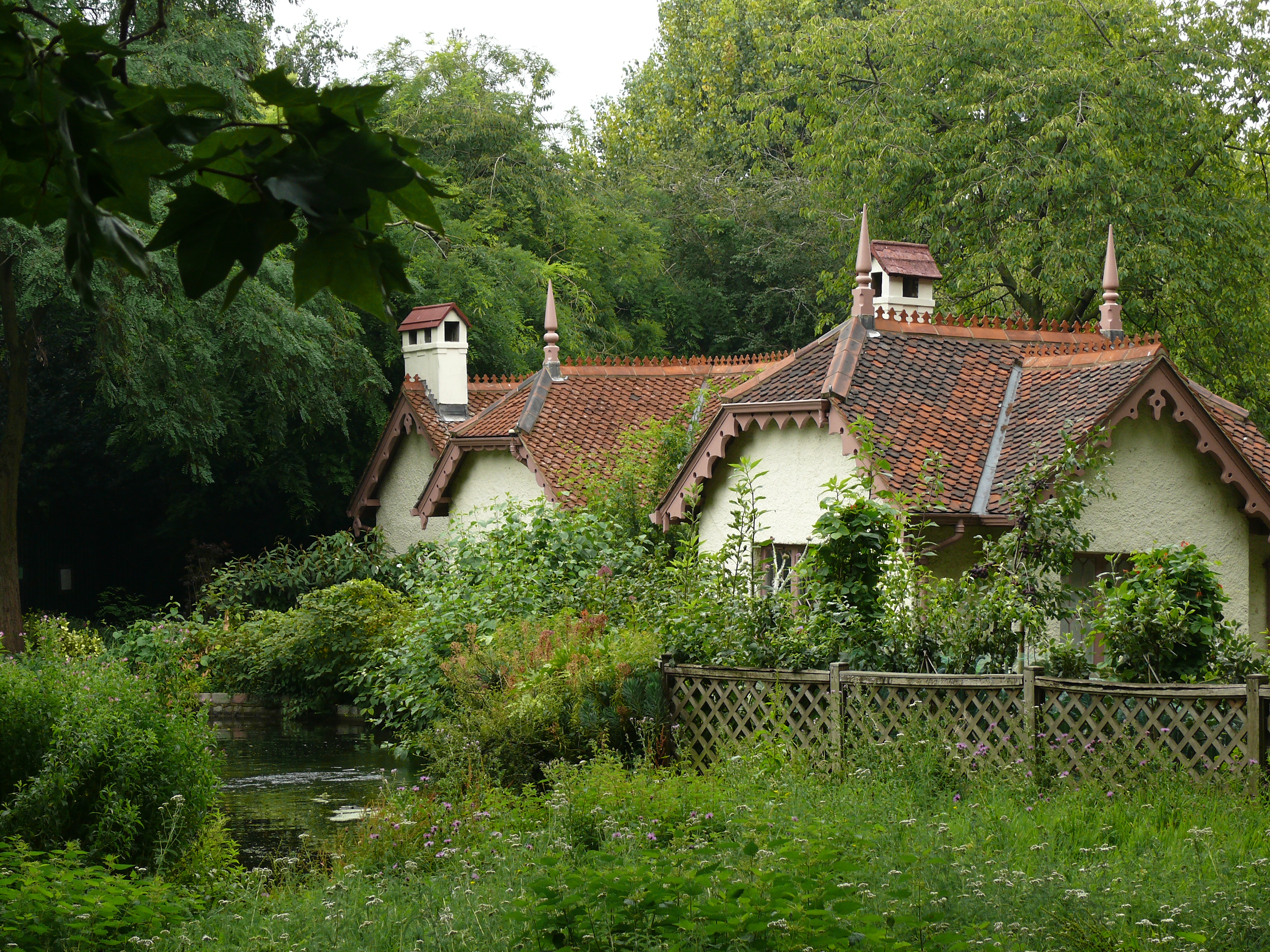
Duck Island Cottage

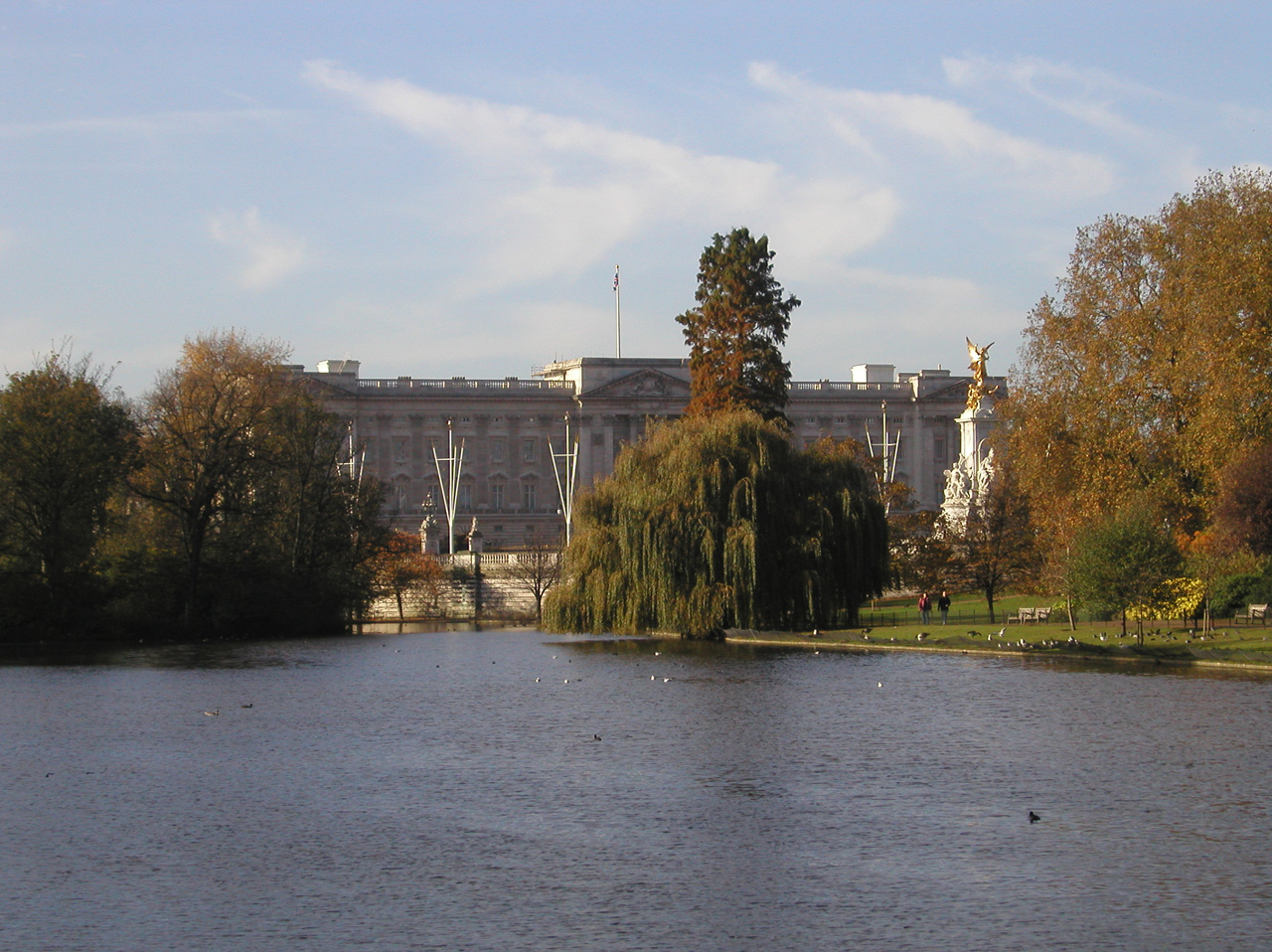
St James's Park Lake, looking northwest, with Buckingham Palace in the background
