= London Parks and Gardens =

British charitable trust

- London Historic Parks and Gardens Trust
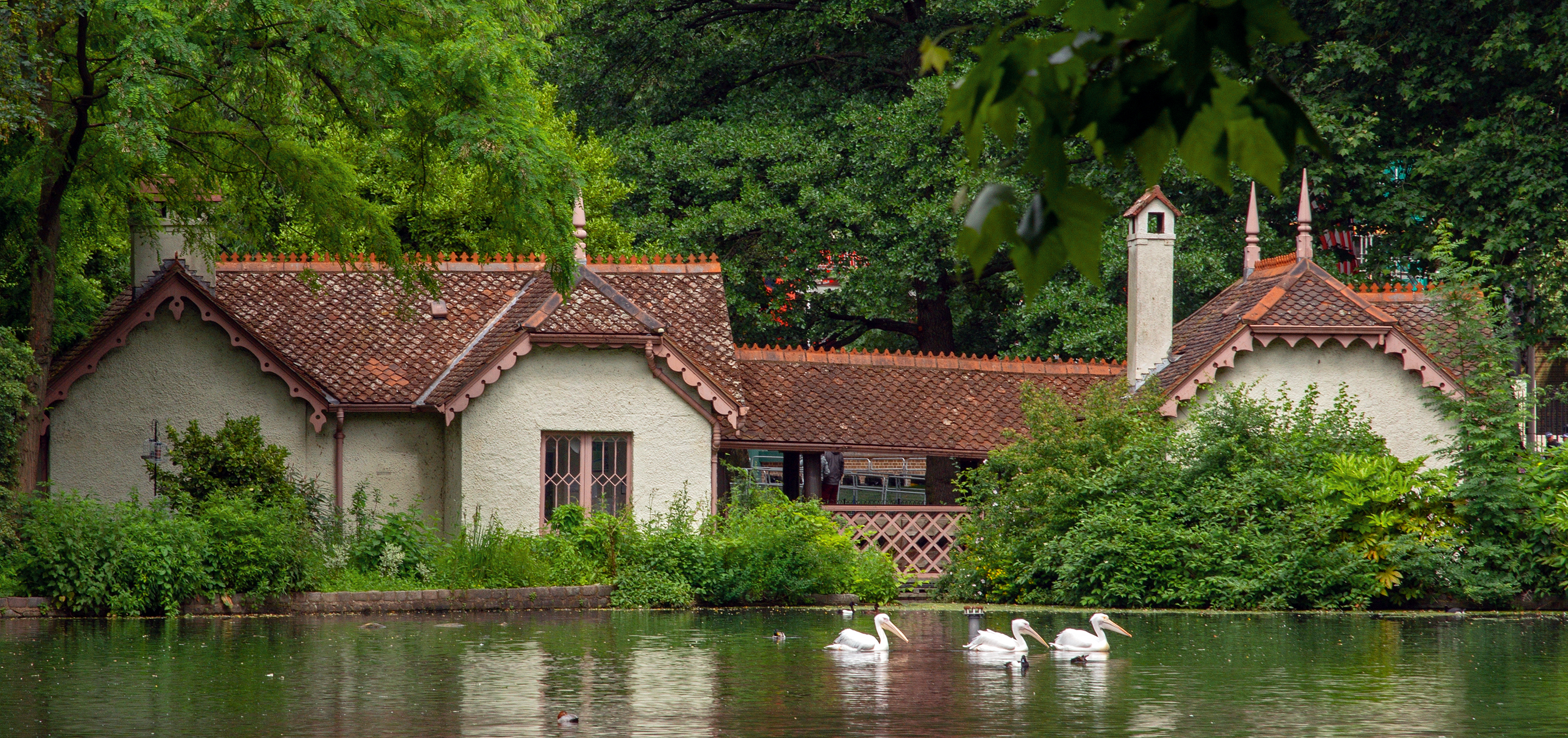
- Headquarters in St James's Park
- Interactive map of the location
- Abbreviation: LPG
- Formation: 1994
- Registration no.: Charity 1042337; Company 02935176
- Legal status: Charity
- Headquarters: Duck Island Cottage, St James's Park, London SW1A 2BJ
- Location: England
- Coordinates: 51.503167°N 0.130629°W
- Region served: Greater London
- Director: Tim Webb
- Parent organization: The Gardens Trust
- Budget: ▲£219,155 (2024)
- Revenue: ▲£269,388 (2024)
- Volunteers: 150 (2024)
- Website: londongardenstrust.org

London Historic Parks and Gardens Trust, operating as London Parks and Gardens (LPG), is a registered charity based in London, England. It is a member of The Gardens Trust.

== Activities ==
LPG was launched at the Chelsea Flower Show in May 1994. LPG "promotes public interest and knowledge about historic parks and gardens in London". Activities include "research, publication, education, planning and conservation, membership activities" and the annual London Open Gardens weekend. The LPG website provides a database of over 2,500 "parks, gardens, squares, churchyards, cemeteries and other sites of historic interest".

=== Victoria Tower Gardens ===
In February 2025, London Parks and Gardens and Europa Nostra UK successfully nominated Victoria Tower Gardens to be added to the Europa Nostra 7 Most Endangered list of heritage sites.

== Governance ==
London Historic Parks and Gardens Trust is a registered charity (number 1042337). It is a local member body of The Gardens Trust. Its headquarters are at Duck Island Cottage in St James's Park, central London. LPG is a founder member of the More Natural Capital Coalition, of charities advocating for the sustainable development of green spaces across London.

== See also ==
- Yorkshire Gardens Trust
