= Étienne Dupérac =

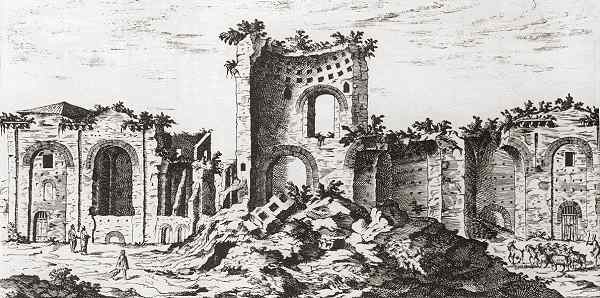
Remains of the Baths of Constantine in Rome, etching by Dupérac (c. 1575)

Étienne Dupérac (or du Pérac) (c. 1525 – March 1604) was a French architect, painter, engraver, and garden designer. He is most well known for his topographical studies of Rome and its ruins in the late 16th century.

== Rome ==
Dupérac was born in Bordeaux or Paris and arrived in Rome in 1550, where he became a skilled designer and engraver. He published a bird's-eye view of Ancient Rome with buildings reconstructed (Urbis Romae Sciographia, 1574) and one of modern Rome (Descriptio, 1577) and a book of forty engravings of Roman monuments and antiquities, I vestigi dell'antichità di Roma (Rome, 1575).

An unpublished book of drawings on parchment of ruins of Rome confronted with reconstructions of their original appearance, from the same angle, Disegni de le Ruine di Roma e Come Anticamente Erono, attributed to him and dated c. 1564-1574 was published in facsimile (Milan 1964) with an introduction by Rudolf Wittkower, who dated them on the basis of the actual state of the buildings shown; the text that must have accompanied the drawings has not survived, and Dupérac's authorship has been called into question. The book is part of the collection of the Morgan Library & Museum in New York (acc. no. MS M.1106).

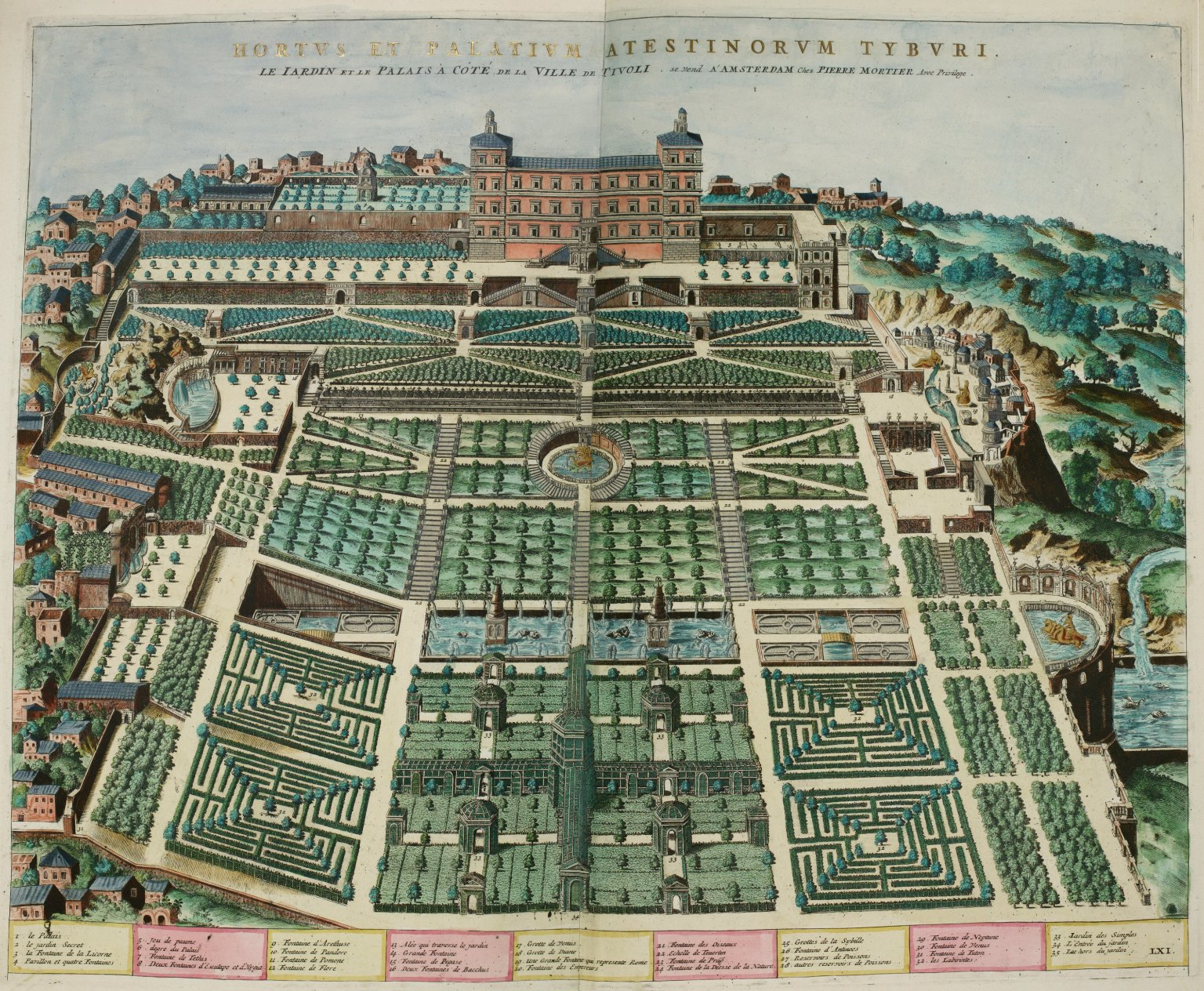
A view of the Villa d'Este by Dupérac (1575)

Dupérac's engravings of modern Rome, such as the carrousel in the Cortile del Belvedere or his bird's-eye view of the Villa d'Este, served to transmit architectural and gardening ideas to France and the north of Europe. Dupérac worked for a time for Antonio Lafreri.

== France ==
On his return to France by 1578, Dupérac was commissioned to paint the Cabinet des Bains at the Château de Fontainebleau, and may have designed some of the gardens. He has also been credited with the design of the gardens at Anet, as architect to the duke of Aumale. As architect to Henri IV beginning in 1595, he may have designed the terraced gardens at Saint-Germain-en-Laye, and was engaged in work at the Tuileries in Paris (c. 1600–1603).

Dupérac died in Paris.

An album signed by Dupérac and dated 1575, Illustration des fragments antiques, is conserved in the Louvre. An etching from Speculum Romanae Magnificentiae is exhibited in the Palazzo Braschi in Rome.

== Sources ==
- Arnold, Dana (1998). "Dupérac, Etienne". In Jane Turner (ed.). The Dictionary of Art. Vol. 9. New York: Grove. p. 398. ISBN 9781884446009.
- Karling, Sten (1974). "The importance of André Mollet and his family for the development of the French formal garden". In Elizabeth B. Macdougall; F. Hamilton Hazlehurst (eds.). The French Formal Garden. Washington: Dumbarton Oaks. pp. 2–25. ISBN 9780884020523.
- Miller, Naomi (1982). "Dupérac, Etienne". In Adolf K. Placzek (ed.). Macmillan Encyclopedia of Architects. Vol. 1. New York: The Free Press. p. 613. ISBN 9780029250006.
- Zerner, Henri (December 1965). "Observations on Dupérac and the Disegni de le ruine di Roma e come anticamente erono". The Art Bulletin. 47 (4): 507–512.
