= The Bride (1985 film) =

1985 Gothic romance film by Franc Roddam

- Theatrical release poster
- Directed by: Franc Roddam
- Screenplay by: Lloyd Fonvielle
- Based on: Frankenstein by Mary Shelley
- Produced by: Victor Drai; Chris Kenny
- Starring: Sting; Jennifer Beals; Geraldine Page; Clancy Brown; Anthony Higgins; David Rappaport
- Cinematography: Stephen H. Burum
- Edited by: Michael Ellis
- Music by: Maurice Jarre
- Production companies: Colgems Productions; Delphi III Productions; Columbia Pictures
- Distributed by: Columbia Pictures
- Release dates: August 16, 1985 (United States); November 1, 1985 (United Kingdom)
- Running time: 119 minutes
- Countries: United States; United Kingdom
- Language: English
- Budget: $13 million
- Box office: $3.6 million

The Bride is a 1985 Gothic romance science fiction horror film (Note: Sources describe the film as featuring elements of numerous genres, including Gothic romance, horror, horror drama, and science fiction, among others.) directed by Franc Roddam, and starring Sting, Jennifer Beals, Geraldine Page, and Clancy Brown, with Anthony Higgins, Alexei Sayle, Veruschka, Quentin Crisp, and Cary Elwes appearing in supporting roles. Based on Mary Shelley's 1818 novel Frankenstein, the film follows Baron Charles Frankenstein who creates a woman, Eva, while his original monster—believed to have been killed in a laboratory accident—escapes into the countryside.

An international co-production between the United States and the United Kingdom, The Bride was written by screenwriter Lloyd Fonvielle during a period of writer's block while he was attempting to complete the screenplay for Roddam's The Lords of Discipline (1983). The project was pitched to numerous film studios before Columbia Pictures agreed to co-produce and distribute it. Principal photography began in June 1984 and lasted six months, with filming taking place at Shepperton Studios in Surrey and various locations in France.

The Bride was released theatrically in the United States on August 16, 1985, and in the United Kingdom on November 1, 1985. The film received generally negative reviews from critics, with criticism aimed at Sting's and Beals's performances, as well as the screenplay's handling of parallel storylines, though it did earn some praise for its period detail and cinematography. The film was a box-office bomb, grossing $3.6 million against a budget of approximately $13 million. It received two nominations at the 13th Saturn Awards, for Best Music and Best Costume Design. The film has garnered a small cult following in the years since its original release.

== Plot ==
Baron Charles Frankenstein, Dr. Zalhus, and Frankenstein's assistant, Paulus, attempt to create a female mate, Eva, for his creation. The team of scientists succeed in creating Eva, who is physically identical to a human and lacking the deformities of the monster. As such, she is revolted by the monster and rejects him. A confrontation between the monster and Frankenstein regarding Eva leads the monster to fly into a rage and destroy the laboratory. Frankenstein, believing the monster has died, flees with Eva back to Castle Frankenstein. There he falls in love with her and, with the help of his friend Charles Clerval and housekeeper Mrs. Baumann, educates her with the goal of making her a perfect human mate.

The monster, having survived, wanders into the countryside where he befriends a dwarf, Rinaldo. As they learn more about one another, Rinaldo eventually gives the monster more humanity by gracing him with a name: Viktor ("he will win"). The men travel by foot through Europe, eventually arriving in Budapest, where they become involved with a circus owner named Magar, who hires them despite his dislike for Rinaldo. Meanwhile, as Eva acquires language and develops further cognizance, she begins to question her origin and, while visiting a decrepit mausoleum with Baron Charles, tells him that she wishes to "go home."

The Baron has Eva accompany him to a formal party held by a Countess, where he introduces her. Eva is initially well-spoken and formal, impressing the Countess, Captain Josef Schoden, and other guests, but becomes agitated when a cat enters the room. Having no knowledge of the animal, Eva begins to scream at it, embarrassing the Baron. Several days later, while riding her horse near the castle, Eva is approached by Josef, who attempts to romance her. Josef informs Eva that the Baron was thrown out of university while studying medicine. She begins to question the Baron and his intentions.

Meanwhile, during a trapeze performance with the circus, Rinaldo is fatally injured in a fall. Viktor is immediately heartbroken at the loss of his friend, a feeling that Eva apparently feels. As Viktor mourns, Eva suddenly feels a great sense of loss and cries in her room, hinting at some kind of psychic connection between the two. Viktor learns that the circus performer Bela deliberately tampered with Rinaldo's harness, causing the fall. He flies into a rage, flipping Magar's caravan over before killing Bela. Viktor returns to the Castle and finds Eva outside on the grounds. Eva mistakes him for a vagrant, not recognizing him. Later, a mob from the circus arrives in the village in search of Viktor, and shackles him to a wall. Meanwhile, Eva disappears from the Castle. The Baron inquires of her whereabouts, and Mrs. Baumann reluctantly reveals that she has run away with Josef.

The Baron locates the two lovers. Much to Eva's shock, Josef reveals he doesn't care much or at all about Eva and walks away from her not looking back. The Baron drags defiant Eva back to the Castle. During an argument, the Baron finally reveals to Eva how he created her, using parts of corpses, and bringing her to life via an electric charge. This information mortifies Eva. His possessive nature shows as he demands he'll take Eva as his, whether she consents or not. Though Eva tries to keep him away from her, she is virtually trapped and feels helpless. Viktor senses her fear and desperation. He breaks free from his shackles and flees by horse to Castle Frankenstein.

Back at the castle the Baron fights Eva, a fight she loses. Before the Baron can force himself on Eva, Viktor confronts him. A fight ensues, and Viktor is chased to the top of the laboratory, where he throws the Baron to his death. In the castle, Viktor returns to a sleeping Eva and when she awakens, he turns to leave. Eva asks him to stay and he introduces himself to her with his name. She tells him the meaning of his name, which pleases him. She asks if he knows who made him and he reveals that it was the Baron. Reunited, they head off to Venice to fulfill Rinaldo's dream.

== Cast ==
- Sting as Baron Charles Frankenstein
- Jennifer Beals as Eva
- Clancy Brown as Viktor, the Monster
- David Rappaport as Rinaldo
- Geraldine Page as Mrs. Baumann
- Anthony Higgins as Clerval
- Alexei Sayle as Magar
- Veruschka as Countess
- Quentin Crisp as Dr. Zalhus
- Cary Elwes as Captain Josef Schoden
- Phil Daniels as Bela
- Timothy Spall as Paulus
- Ken Campbell as Pedlar
- Guy Rolfe as Count
- Tony Haygarth as Tavern Keeper
- Matthew Guinness as Patron
- John Sharp as Bailiff
- Gary Shail as Circus Hand
- Janine Duvitski as Serving Girl

== Production ==
=== Development ===
The Bride was written by Lloyd Fonvielle, loosely adapted from Mary Shelley's Frankenstein, and begins where the 1935 film Bride of Frankenstein ends, with the creation of Frankenstein's monster's bride. Fonvielle began writing the screenplay around 1983, after suffering writer's block while completing the screenplay for Roddam's second feature film, The Lords of Discipline. The film's screenplay has been described by critics as featuring elements of Gothic romance, science fiction, horror, and dark fantasy. Director Franc Roddam, however, envisioned the film purely as a Gothic fairy tale, noting: "Once you get past the first ten minutes... it isn't even a science movie... This is a fairy tale, but I'm filming it as if it were All the President's Men. It's a love story, sure. I'm very interested in love, like everybody else who has ever lived."

The Bride features some deviations from its source material: Frankenstein's full name in the film is Baron Charles Frankenstein, unlike Mary Shelley's Victor Frankenstein or the classic Universal Studios movie's Henry Frankenstein. The dwarf character in the film is named Rinaldo, after the name of blacklisted Abbott and Costello Meet Frankenstein screenwriter Frederic I. Rinaldo, who also wrote the scripts for several Universal films, including Abbott and Costello Meet the Invisible Man (1951); Hold That Ghost (1941); The Black Cat (1941) and The Invisible Woman (1940).

Roddam and Fonvielle pitched the film to "every major studio" in Hollywood, and were turned down by all except Columbia Pictures, where executive Guy McElwaine championed the project. Despite McElwaine's enthusiasm, then-studio head Frank Price overruled him and passed on the film. Following Price's resignation from Columbia in October 1983, McElwaine was appointed as his replacement, and immediately greenlit the project.

=== Casting ===
The lead casting of Sting and Jennifer Beals as Baron Charles Frankenstein and Eva, respectively, was announced in May 1984. Roddam had previously directed Sting in Quadrophenia (1979). Executive producer Keith Addis commented on Sting's casting: "When he read for the part of the doctor in Bride, he blew us away. He's impressive. He's got this incredible, instinctual appeal." Sting had recently completed filming on David Lynch's Dune (1984) when cast. Beals, who had garnered notoriety for her lead performance in Flashdance (1984), was a sophomore at Yale University at the time of her casting. The university accommodated her shooting schedule as long as she completed her term papers, which she submitted by mail.

Prior to principal photography beginning, Roddam worked with Sting and Beals privately on location in Europe for approximately one month, conducting rehearsals as well as teaching Beals how to ride a horse. "She got very involved in the film," Roddam recalled. "In between casting and checking the sets, I would do a couple of hours with them and make them interact, so they got over their nervousness and anxieties. I did it like a theater director."

Clancy Brown was cast in the role of Viktor, Frankenstein's monster, marking his first major leading role. To prepare for the part, Brown read extensively about the Frankenstein mythos, and became an admirer of Boris Karloff, who portrayed the monster in several films.

=== Filming ===
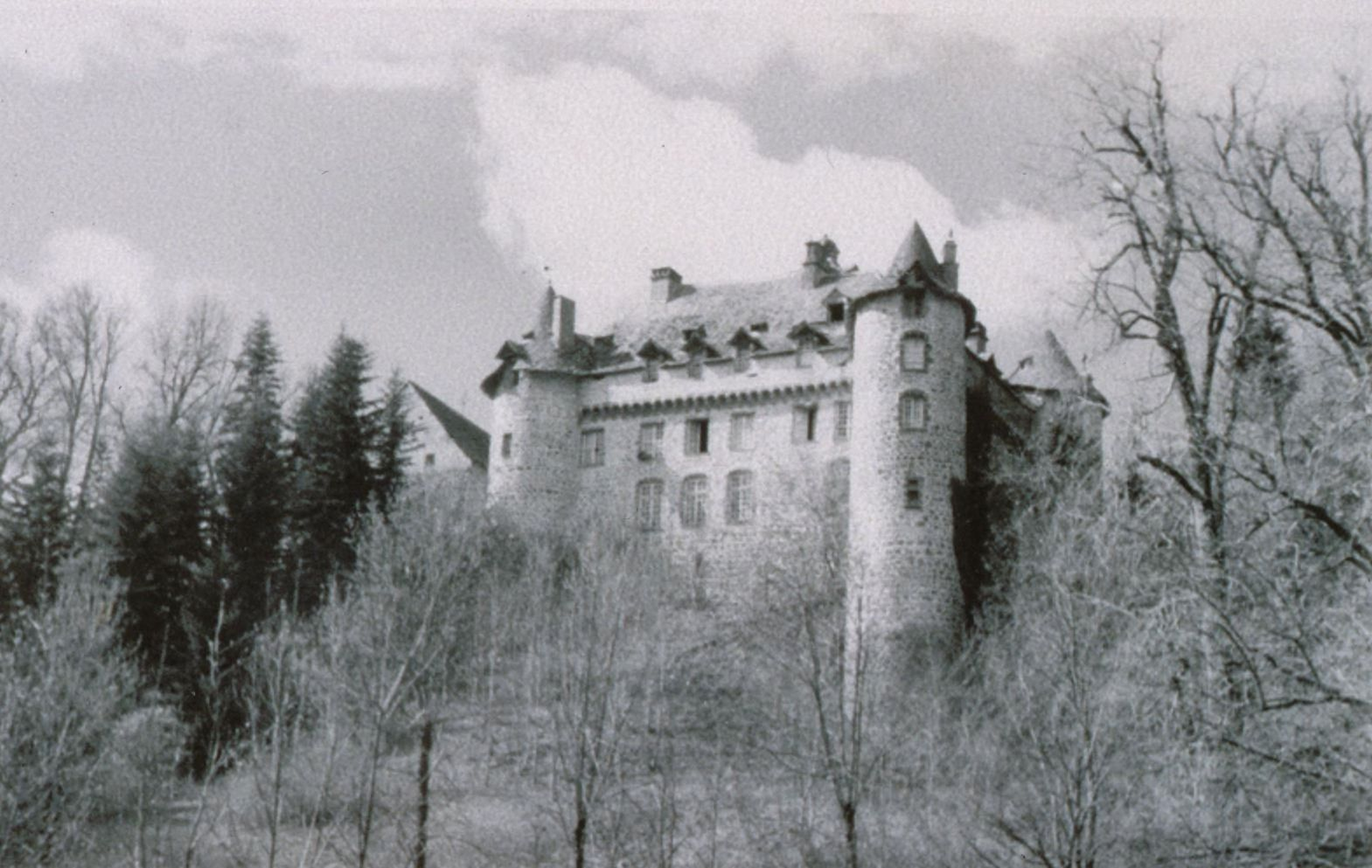
The Château de Cordès served as the exterior of Frankenstein's castle

Principal photography of The Bride began on June 6, 1984, on a budget of approximately $13 million. Interiors were shot at Lee International's Shepperton Studios in England, while location photography occurred in France, largely in the commune of Pérouges, Auvergne-Rhône-Alpes and Dordogne. The Château de Cordès in Orcival served as the exterior of Frankenstein's castle, while Sarlat-la-Canéda and Carcassonne served as a stand-ins for medieval Budapest. Roddam stated that he preferred filming in Europe as it was more cost effective: "The Bride cost $13 million, but in the States it would have been at least $25 million. You get very good value in Europe, but you have to go to Hollywood to get financed."

Filming of The Bride was met by several setbacks: Early into the shoot, filming was halted for two weeks after actor Clancy Brown developed an allergy to his extensive monster prosthetic makeup, which required daily applications that took nearly four hours. In a 2021 interview with Mick Garris, Brown recalled: "Instead of using Duo, which is a latex-based prosthetic glue that you use for surgical prosthetics, they used the European version. Apparently in the Duo version, they put an additive in that neutralizes the ammonia that they use to liquidate the raw latex so it doesn't get hard. But [our glue] didn’t have that additive, so it was just latex and ammonia. The latex was fine, but the ammonia ate away my skin for a while." After Brown's face healed, makeup artist Sarah Monzani utilized a contact adhesive that Brown's skin was able to tolerate.

Near the end of the shoot, in October 1984, during the filming of a circus sequence at Shepperton Studios, a fire broke out engulfing the circus tent in flames and destroying the set, though all 300 cast and crew members present escaped unharmed. This further stalled principal photography, as the production had to wait five weeks for a new circus tent to be constructed. Roddam used the opportunity to begin editing the film during this period. "It was frustrating because I had to leave four big gaps for the scenes with the tent," he said. "After the tent was rebuilt I had to try and round up my original crew and it took an additional week to film the last scenes. Fortunately these problems didn’t compromise what I wanted to get out of the film."

Beals used a body double for the scene in which her character appears nude descending a staircase. Filming was officially completed in December 1984.

== Music ==
The film's star, Sting, was originally hired to compose the original musical score, but was ultimately replaced by Maurice Jarre. Varèse Sarabande released Jarre's original motion picture score on vinyl in 1985.

== Release ==
The Bride was originally intended to be released in the United States on June 21, 1985 by Columbia Pictures, but its release was postponed to August 16, 1985. The film was sometimes screened as a midnight movie during its U.S. theatrical run.

The film opened theatrically in the United Kingdom later that fall, on November 1, 1985, premiering at London's Odeon Leicester Square.

=== Home media ===
The film was released on VHS, Betamax, and LaserDisc by RCA/Columbia Pictures Home Video in 1986. GoodTimes Entertainment reissued the film on VHS in 1989. A DVD edition was released by Columbia TriStar Home Entertainment on September 11, 2001, featuring an audio commentary from director Franc Roddam.

Scream Factory released the film on Blu-ray September 25, 2018. This release features Roddam's 2001 audio commentary, as well as newly-commissioned interviews with Roddam and actor Clancy Brown, and an original television spot.

== Reception ==
=== Box office ===
The Bride ranked at number 11 at the United States box office during its opening weekend, earning $1,763,277 on 955 screens. Its release expanded to a peak of 980 theaters. Its ranking fell to number 16 during its second weekend, earning $890,695. The film was a box-office bomb, completing its theatrical run with a total gross of $3,558,669 in the United States.

=== Critical response ===
The Bride received generally unfavorable reviews from film critics upon release. On the review aggregator website Rotten Tomatoes, 27% of 15 critics' reviews are positive. Metacritic, which uses a weighted average, assigned the film a score of 30 out of 100, based on 9 critics, indicating "generally unfavorable" reviews. Audiences polled by CinemaScore gave the film an average grade of "C" on an A+ to F scale.

Gene Siskel of the Chicago Tribune deemed the film a letdown, citing its failure in telling a cohesive narrative, labeling the film as a "female Frankenstein morality play intercut with sort of a human version of Dumbo" while also noting the abruptness of the ending. He also felt Beals was miscast, finding her "too modern" for the role. Stephen Holden of The New York Times called it a "very loose, freewheeling remake of The Bride of Frankenstein." He said the screenplay was "structured as an allegory relating the Frankenstein myth to Pygmalion and Beauty and the Beast; calling the connections "forced and heavy-handed." Of Jennifer Beals, he said her performance "sinks this already muddled mess of a movie like a stone." Jacqi Tully of the Arizona Daily Star panned the film, finding Sting and Beals's performances specifically unimpressive, concluding: "The Bride is a boring horror movie, refined and prettified and set to lush Maurice Jarre music. Pointless, aimless and reeling from unsatisfactory performances, [it] can be tossed into the summer heap of movies whose shelf life is murderously short." The Record's Lou Lumenick also harshly critiqued the film, specifically Sting's lead performance, writing that he "may be the first actor ever upstaged by a large, curved marble pillar." Entertainment Weekly praised Brown's performance as "remarkable" but felt that director Roddam "was going for a gothic, Bronte-esque romance; what he got was a misshapen lump."

Several critics commented on the film's tonal inconsistencies and balancing of two parallel storylines. Kevin Thomas of the Los Angeles Times cited this as a fault, writing: "Serious problems of structure and pacing afflict the film from the start. No sooner are we on the verge of involvement with one of the stories than we’re switched to the other. The effect, compounded by deliberately languid pacing, is that Bride scarcely ever comes alive—except when Rappaport is on the screen." James J. Mulay, in the book The Horror Film: A Guide to More Than 700 Films on Videocassette (1989) also observed this structural issue, noting: "The Bride must be commended for its attempt to tell two parallel stories, but unfortunately the halves do not balance, resulting in a picture in which the lead characters (Sting and Beals) become secondary to the supporting ones (Brown and Rappaport)." Mulay did, however, commend the film for its cinematography and gothic European atmosphere. Derek Malcolm of The Guardian wrote that the film "looks good and tries hard for a kind of fairy-tale significance. But the screenplay... is generally awful, so any ideas the film has are suffused in the dreadful afterglow of cinematic ancient and modern."

The Daily Item's Larry Worth found the film's mixture of genres confounding, writing: "In the opening scene, [Roddam is] after horror—no question about it... But the next thing you know, it's on to comedy... The changes are unsettling and off-putting. So by the time Roddam throws in gratuitous nudity and violence (with no less than three given shots of any blood-oriented moments), viewers are left in an absolute whirl." Noel Taylor of the Toledo Blade gave the film a mixed review, summarizing it as "unevenly cast, sweet-natured and cruel, Gothically feminist and only a vague reminder of the Mary Shelley original or the 1935 Hollywood Bride of Frankenstein whose memory its makers seem determined to bury."

Alternately, Michael H. Price of the Fort Worth Star-Telegram awarded the film a favorable review; he praised it as "classic-manner moviemaking, breaking new ground with immense respect for what has gone before," as well as favorably describing Beals's acting as expressive and Sting's "stuffy portrayal of the Baron" as "unlike any prior characterization but in a league with Colin Clive's Type-A lunatic of 1931–35 and Peter Cushing's defiant man-above-men of the later Hammer Films Frankensteins." Malcolm L. Johnson of the Hartford Courant also favored the film, describing it as "darkly fascinating" and "ravishing to look upon." The Oregonian's Bob Hicks also lauded the cinematography and visuals, concluding in his review: "The Bride has its problems, most of them tied to its tendency to go too far and become unintentionally funny. But it takes seriously an old theme that still has considerable life in it—the historical break between a religious and a rational, or scientific, worldview—and it is one of the most visually alluring movies we are likely to see this year."

=== Accolades ===
Award/association	Year	Category	Recipient(s) and nominee(s)	Result	Ref.
Golden Raspberry Awards	1986	Worst Actress	Jennifer Beals	Nominated	
Saturn Awards	1986	Best Music	Maurice Jarre	Nominated	
Saturn Awards	1986	Best Costume Design	Shirley Russell	Nominated	

== Book adaptations ==
A tie-in novelization by Vonda N. McIntyre based on Fonvielle's screenplay was published by Dell Books in July 1985. The same year, a storybook adaptation by Elizabeth Levy was also published, illustrated with photographs and stills from the film.

== See also ==
- List of films featuring Frankenstein's monster

== Sources ==
- Everman, Welch D. (1993). Cult Horror Films: From Attack of the 50 Foot Woman to Zombies of Mora Tau. New York City, New York: Citadel Press. ISBN 978-0-806-51425-3.
- Gallagher, John A. (1989). Film Directors on Directing. Westport, Connecticut: Praeger Publishers. ISBN 978-0-313-39028-9.
- Kalat, David (2001). The Strange Case of Dr. Mabuse: A Study of the Twelve Films and Five Novels. Jefferson, North Carolina: McFarland & Company. ISBN 978-0-786-41066-8.
- Muir, John Kenneth (2010). Horror Films of the 1980s. Jefferson, North Carolina: McFarland & Company. ISBN 978-0-786-45501-0.
- Mulay, James J. (1989). The Horror Film: A Guide to More Than 700 Films on Videocassette. Evanston, Illinois: CineBooks. ISBN 978-0-933-99723-3.
- Wilson, John (2005). The Official Razzie Movie Guide: Enjoying the Best of Hollywood's Worst. New York City, New York: Warner Books. ISBN 978-0-446-51008-0.
