= French formal garden =

Style of garden based on symmetry

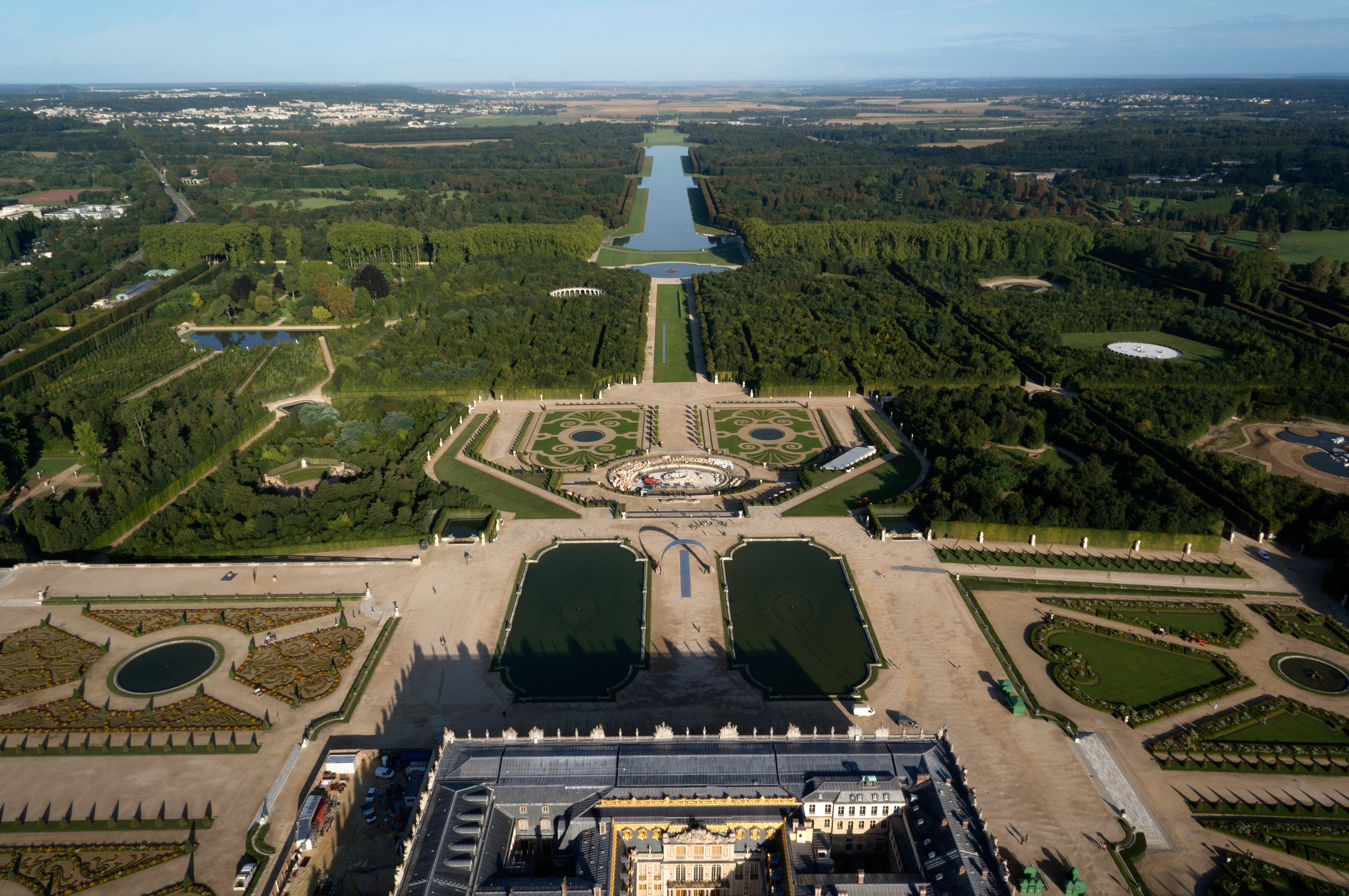
Gardens of Versailles

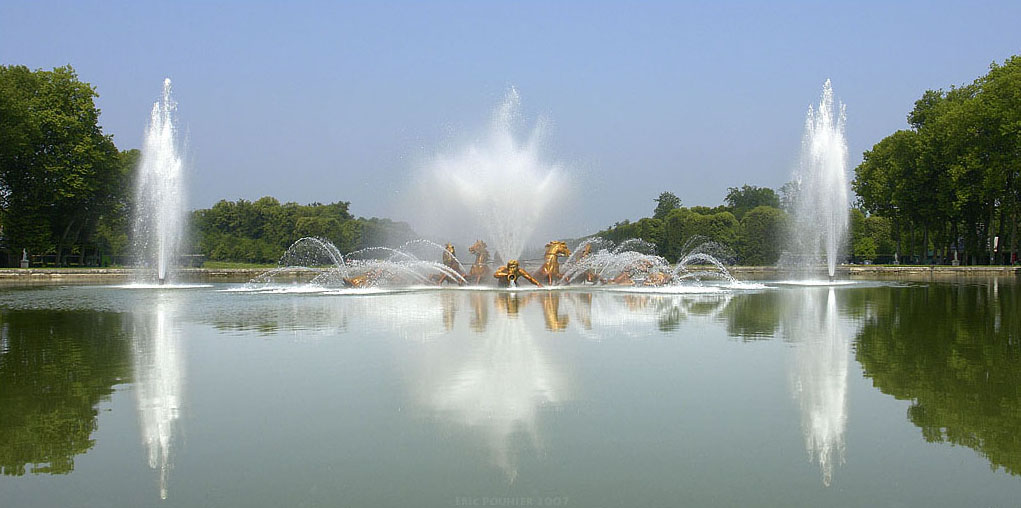
The Bassin d'Apollon in the Gardens of Versailles

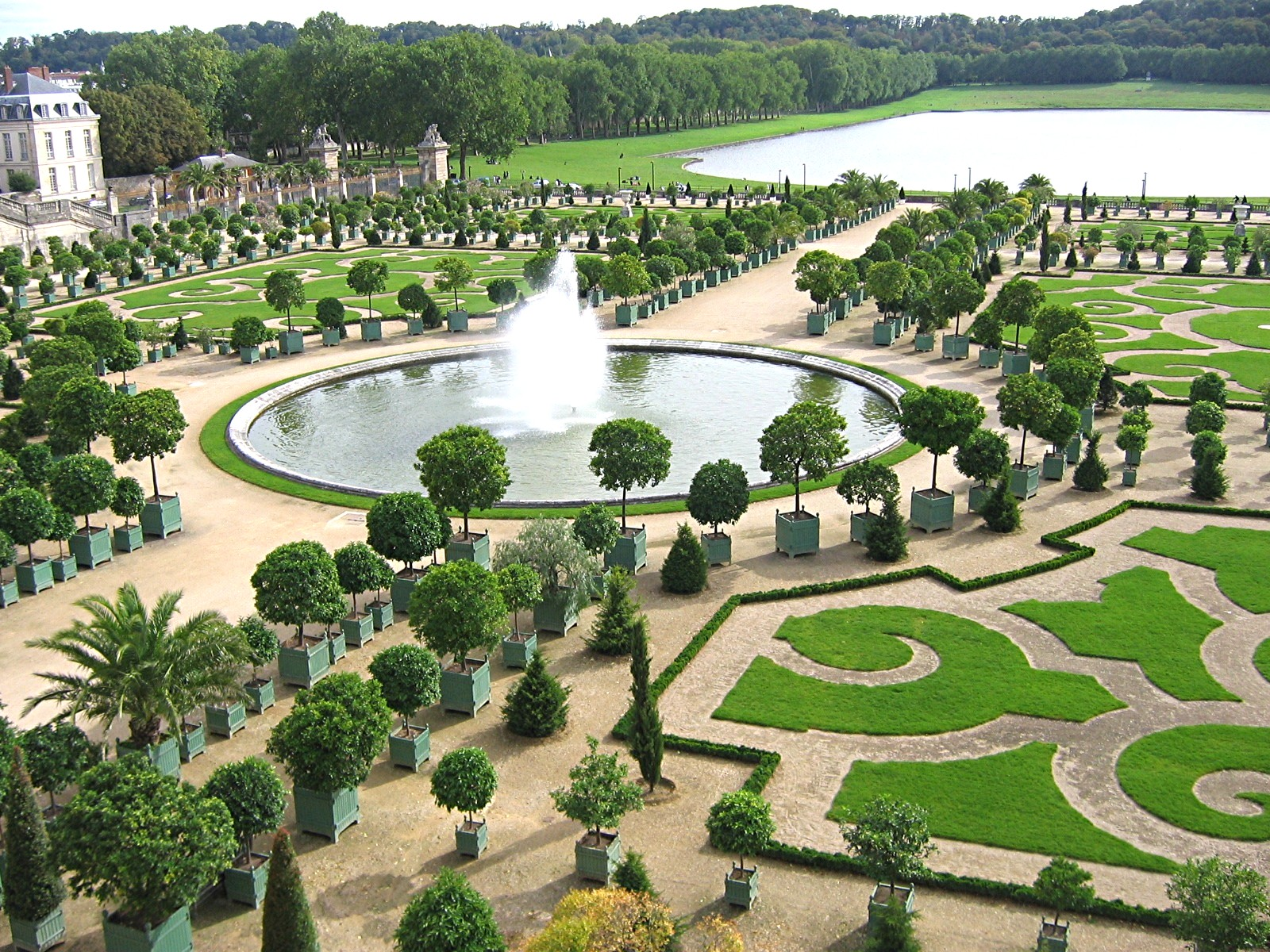
Parterre of the Versailles Orangerie

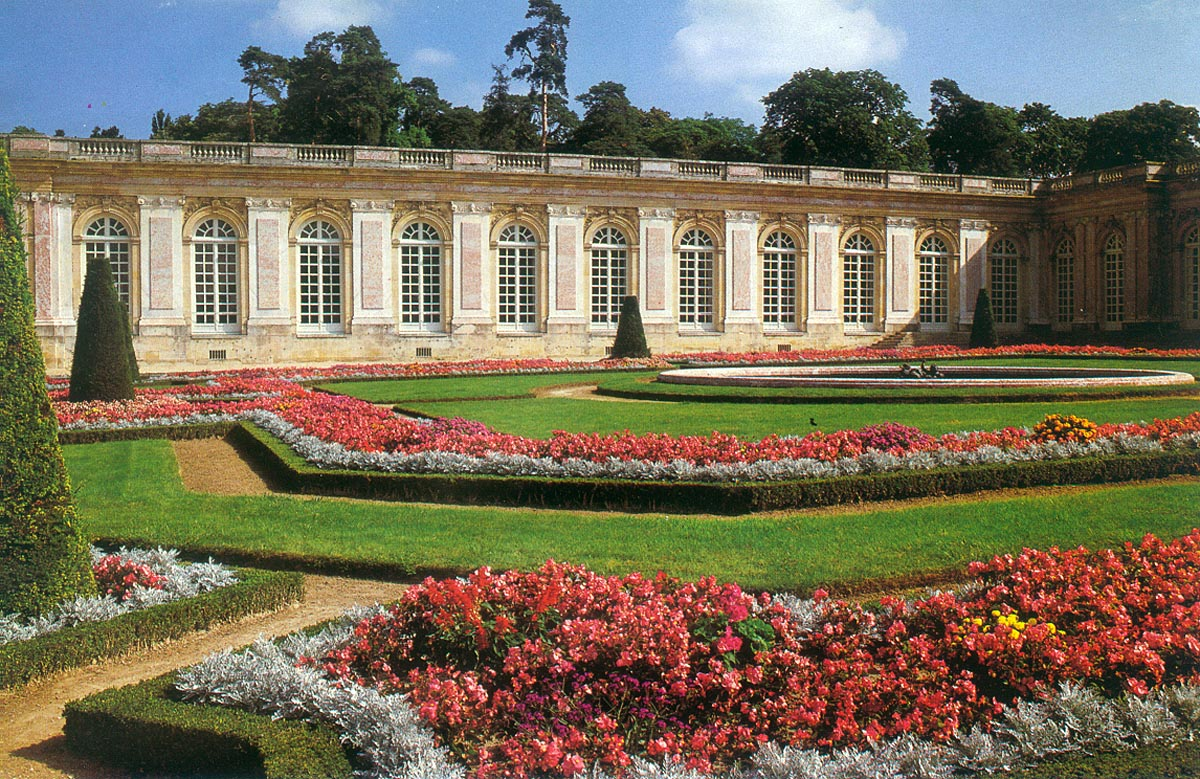
Gardens of the Grand Trianon at the Palace of Versailles

The French formal garden, also called the jardin à la française (French for 'garden in the French manner'), is a style of "landscape" garden based on symmetry and the principle of imposing order on nature. Its epitome is generally considered to be the Gardens of Versailles designed during the 17th century by the landscape architect André Le Nôtre for Louis XIV and widely copied by other European courts.

Classicism was also expressed in horticulture. Jean-Baptiste de La Quintinie introduced an art of fruit pruning and bedding techniques that were to have a lasting impact on production gardens. But the term ‘classical garden’ was only used for pleasure gardens.

== History ==
=== Renaissance influence ===
The jardin à la française evolved from the French Renaissance garden, a style which was inspired by the Italian Renaissance garden at the beginning of the 16th century. The Italian Renaissance garden, typified by the Boboli Gardens in Florence and the Villa Medici in Fiesole, was characterized by planting beds, or parterres, created in geometric shapes, and laid out symmetrical patterns; the use of fountains and cascades to animate the garden; stairways and ramps to unite different levels of the garden; grottos, labyrinths, and statuary on mythological themes. The gardens were designed to represent harmony and order, the ideals of the Renaissance, and to recall the virtues of ancient Rome. Additionally, the symmetry of French gardens was a continuation of the Renaissance themes of harmony. French gardens were symmetrical and well manicured to represent order, and this idea of orderliness extended to French society at the time.

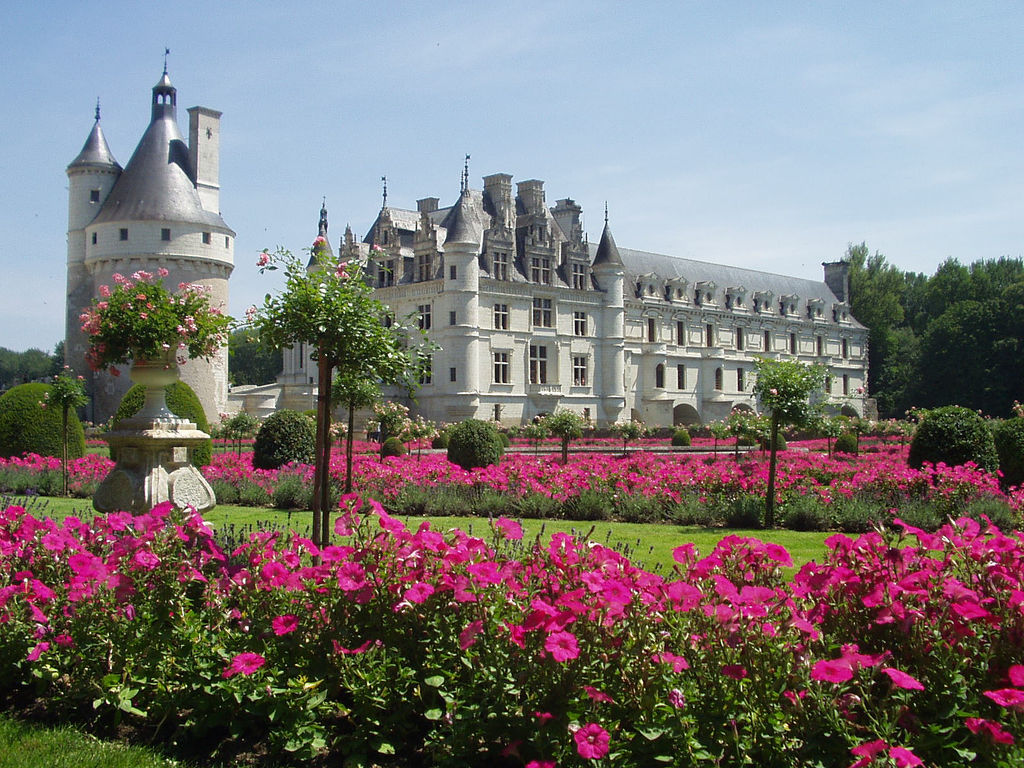
View of the Catherine de' Medici's garden at Château de Chenonceau

Following his campaign in Italy in 1495, where he saw the gardens and castles of Naples, King Charles VIII brought Italian craftsmen and garden designers, such as Pacello da Mercogliano, from Naples and ordered the construction of Italian-style gardens at his residence at the Château d'Amboise and at Château Gaillard, another private résidence in Amboise. His successor Henry II, who had also travelled to Italy and had met Leonardo da Vinci, created an Italian-style garden nearby at the Château de Blois. Beginning in 1528, King Francis I created new gardens at the Château de Fontainebleau, which featured fountains, parterres, a forest of pine trees brought from Provence, and the first artificial grotto in France. The Château de Chenonceau had two gardens in the new style, one created for Diane de Poitiers in 1551, and a second for Catherine de' Medici in 1560.

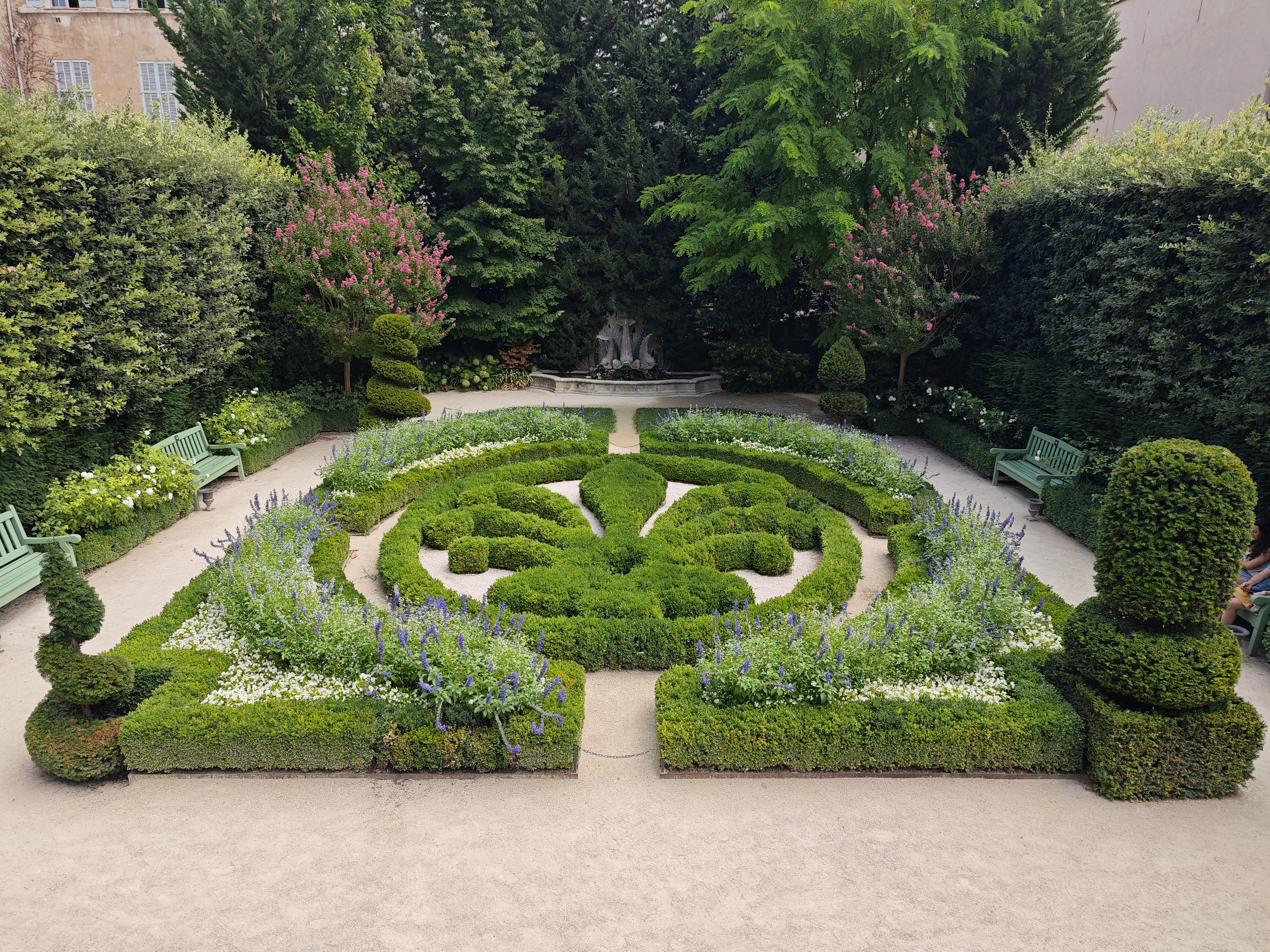
Formal parterre at Hôtel de Caumont

In 1536 the architect Philibert de l'Orme, upon his return from Rome, created the gardens of the Château d'Anet following the Italian rules of proportion. The carefully prepared harmony of Anet, with its parterres and surfaces of water integrated with sections of greenery, became one of the earliest and most influential examples of the classic French garden. Today, water remains a key garden design in the form of round pools and long ponds.

While the gardens of the French Renaissance were much different in their spirit and appearance than those of the Middle Ages, they were still not integrated with the architecture of the châteaux, and were usually enclosed by walls. In French garden design, the chateau or home was supposed to be the visual focal point. The different parts of the gardens were not harmoniously joined, and they were often placed on difficult sites chosen for terrain easy to defend, rather than for beauty. All this was to change in the middle of the 17th century with the development of the first real garden à la française.

=== Vaux-le-Vicomte ===
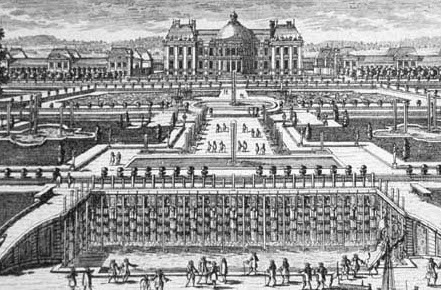
17th-century engraving of Vaux-le-Vicomte

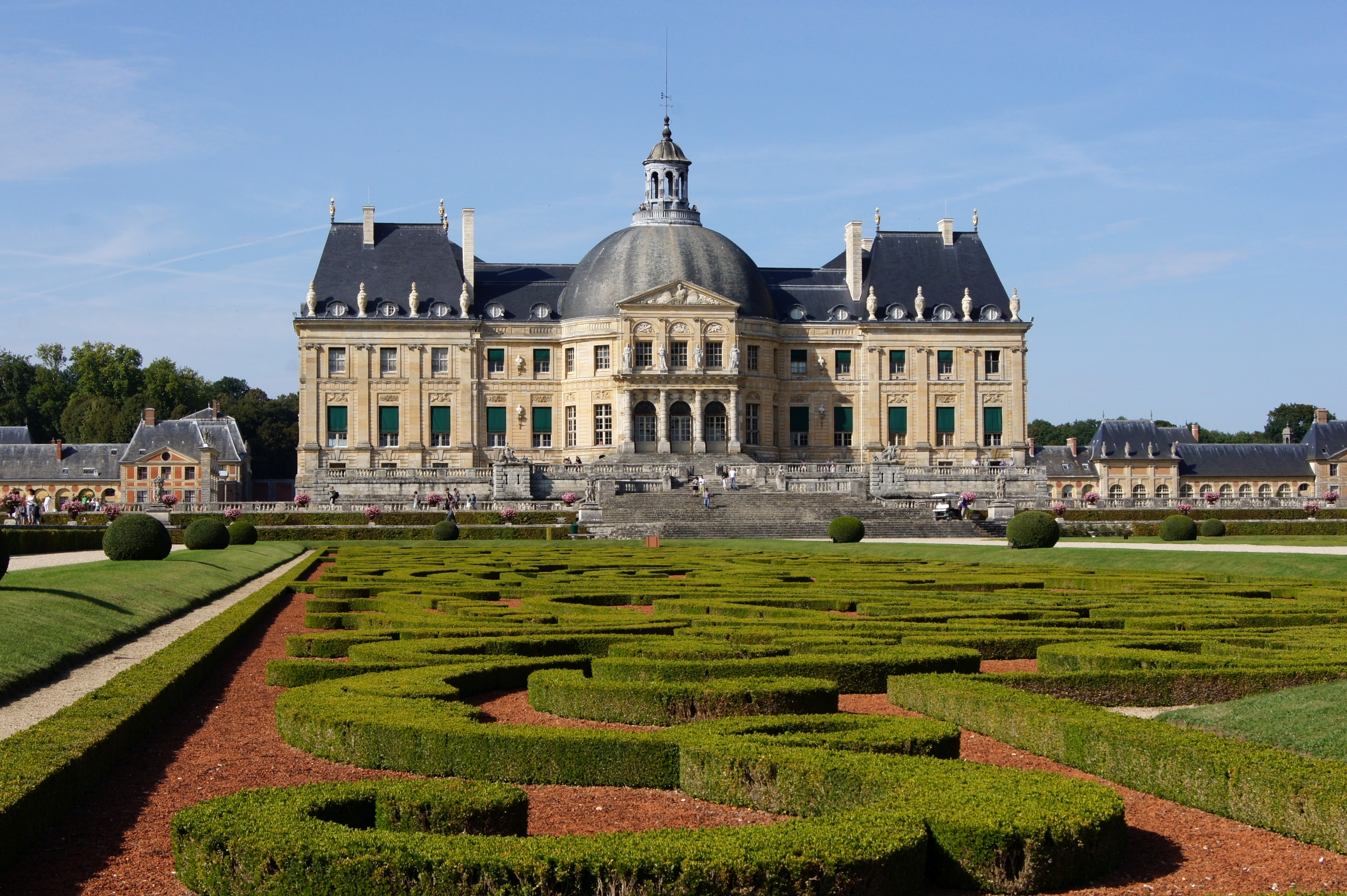
Parterre of broderies (embroidery-like patterning) at Vaux-le-Vicomte

The first important garden à la française was the Chateau of Vaux-le-Vicomte, created for Nicolas Fouquet, the Superintendent of Finances to Louis XIV, beginning in 1656. Fouquet commissioned Louis Le Vau to design the chateau, Charles Le Brun to design statues for the garden, and André Le Nôtre to create the gardens. It was for the first time that the garden and the chateau were perfectly integrated. A grand perspective of 1500 meters extended from the foot of the chateau to the statue of the Farnese Hercules, and the space was filled with parterres of evergreen shrubs in ornamental patterns, bordered by coloured sand, and the alleys were decorated at regular intervals by statues, basins, fountains, and carefully sculpted topiaries. "The symmetry attained at Vaux achieved a degree of perfection and unity rarely equalled in the art of classic gardens. The chateau is at the center of this strict spatial organization, which symbolizes power and success."

=== Gardens of Versailles ===
The Gardens of Versailles, created by André Le Nôtre between 1662 and 1700, were the greatest achievement of the garden à la française. They were the largest gardens in Europe, with an area of 15,000 hectares, and were laid out on an east–west axis followed the course of the sun: the sun rose over the Court of Honor, lit the Marble Court, crossed the Chateau and lit the bedroom of the King, and set at the end of the Grand Canal, reflected in the mirrors of the Hall of Mirrors. In contrast with the grand perspectives, reaching to the horizon, the garden was full of surprises – fountains, small gardens filled with statuary, which provided a more human scale and intimate spaces.

The central symbol of the garden was the sun; the emblem of Louis XIV, illustrated by the statue of Apollo in the central fountain of the garden. "The views and perspectives, to and from the palace, continued to infinity. The king ruled over nature, recreating in the garden not only his domination of his territories, but over the court and his subjects."

=== Decline ===
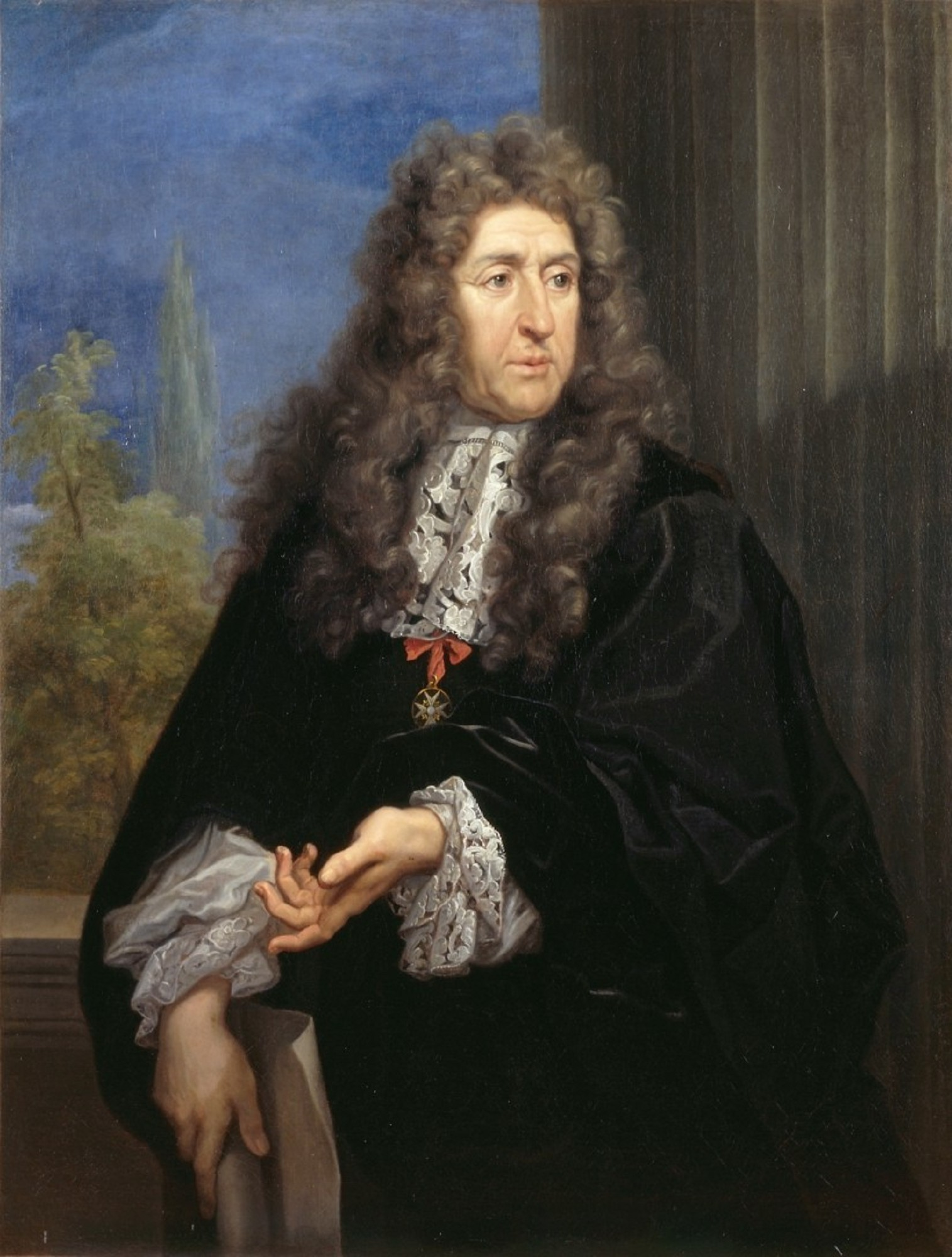
André Le Nôtre

André Le Nôtre died in 1700, but his pupils and his ideas continued to dominate the design of gardens in France through the reign of Louis XV. His nephew, Claude Desgots, created the garden at Château de Bagnolet (Seine-Saint-Denis) for Philippe II, Duke of Orléans (1717) and at Champs (Seine-et-Marne), and another relative, Jean-Charles Garnier d'Isle, created gardens for Madame de Pompadour at Crécy (Eure-et-Loir) in 1746 and Bellevue (Hauts-de-Seine) in 1748–50. The major inspiration for gardens continued to be architecture, rather than nature – the architect Ange-Jacques Gabriel designed elements of the gardens at Versailles, Choisy (Val-de-Marne), and Compiègne.

Nonetheless, a few variations in the strict geometry of the garden à la française began to appear. Elaborate parterres of broderies, with their curves and counter-curves, were replaced by parterres of grass bordered with flowerbeds, which were easier to maintain. Circles became ovals, called rotules, with alleys radiating outward in the shape of an 'x', and irregular octagon shapes appeared. Gardens began to follow the natural landscape, rather than moving earth to shape the ground into artificial terraces. Limited colors were available at the time as well. Traditionally, French gardens included blue, pink, white, and mauve.

The middle of the 18th century saw spread in popularity of the new English landscape garden, created by British aristocrats and landowners, and the Chinese style, brought to France by Jesuit priests from the Court of the Emperor of China. These styles rejected symmetry in favor of nature and rustic scenes and brought an end to the reign of the symmetrical garden à la française. In many French parks and estates, the garden closest to the house was kept in the traditional à la française style, but the rest of the park was transformed into the new style, called variously jardin à l'anglaise (the English garden), "anglo-chinois", exotiques, or "pittoresques". This marked the end of the age of the garden à la française and the arrival in France of the jardin paysager, or landscape garden, which was inspired not by architecture but by painting, literature and philosophy.

== Theorists and gardeners ==
Jacques Boyceau, sieur de la Barauderie (c. 1560–1633) the superintendent of royal gardens under Louis XIII, became the first theorist of the new French style. His book, Traité du jardinage selon les raisons de la nature et de l'art. Ensemble divers desseins de parterres, pelouzes, bosquets et autres ornements was published after his death in 1638. Its sixty-one engravings of designs for parterres and bosquets made it a style book for gardens, which influenced the design the Palais du Luxembourg, the Jardin des Tuileries, and the gardens of Saint Germain-en-Laye.

Claude Mollet (ca 1564-shortly before 1649), was the chief gardener of three French kings: Henry IV, Louis XIII, and the young Louis XIV. His father was head gardener at the Château d'Anet, where Italian formal gardening was introduced to France and where Claude apprenticed. His son was André Mollet, who took the French style to the Netherlands, Sweden and England.

André Le Nôtre (1613–1700) was the most important figure in the history of the French garden. The son of the gardener of Louis XIII, he worked on the plans of Vaux-le-Vicomte, before becoming the chief gardener of Louis XIV between 1645 and 1700, and the designer of the Gardens of Versailles, the greatest garden project of the age. The gardens he created became the symbols of French grandeur and rationality, setting the style for European gardens until the arrival of the English landscape park in the 18th century.

Joseph-Antoine Dezallier d'Argenville (1680–1765) wrote Théorie et traité de jardinage, laid out the principles of the garden à la française, and included drawings and designs of gardens and parterres. It was reprinted many times, and was found in the libraries of aristocrats across Europe.

Glossary
Term	English translation	Definition
Allée	Alleyway	A straight path, often lined with trees
Bosquet	Grove	A small group of trees, usually some distance from the house, designed as an ornamental backdrop
Broderie	Embroidery	A very curling decorative pattern within a parterre, created with trimmed yew or box or made by cutting the pattern out of a lawn and filling it with colored gravel
Jeux d'eau	Water games	An umbrella term for water features
Patte d'oie	Goose foot	Three or five paths or allées which spread outward from a single point
Parterre	On the ground	A planting bed, usually square or rectangular, containing an ornamental design made with low closely clipped hedges, colored gravel, and sometimes flowers. Parterres were usually laid out in geometric patterns, divided by gravel paths. They were intended seen from above from a house or terrace. A parterre de gazon was made of turf with a pattern cut out and filled with gravel.
Saut de loup	Wall	A recessed landscape design element that creates a vertical barrier
Topiary	Ornamental gardening	Trees or bushes trimmed into ornamental shapes. In French gardens, they were usually trimmed into geometric shapes

== Principles ==
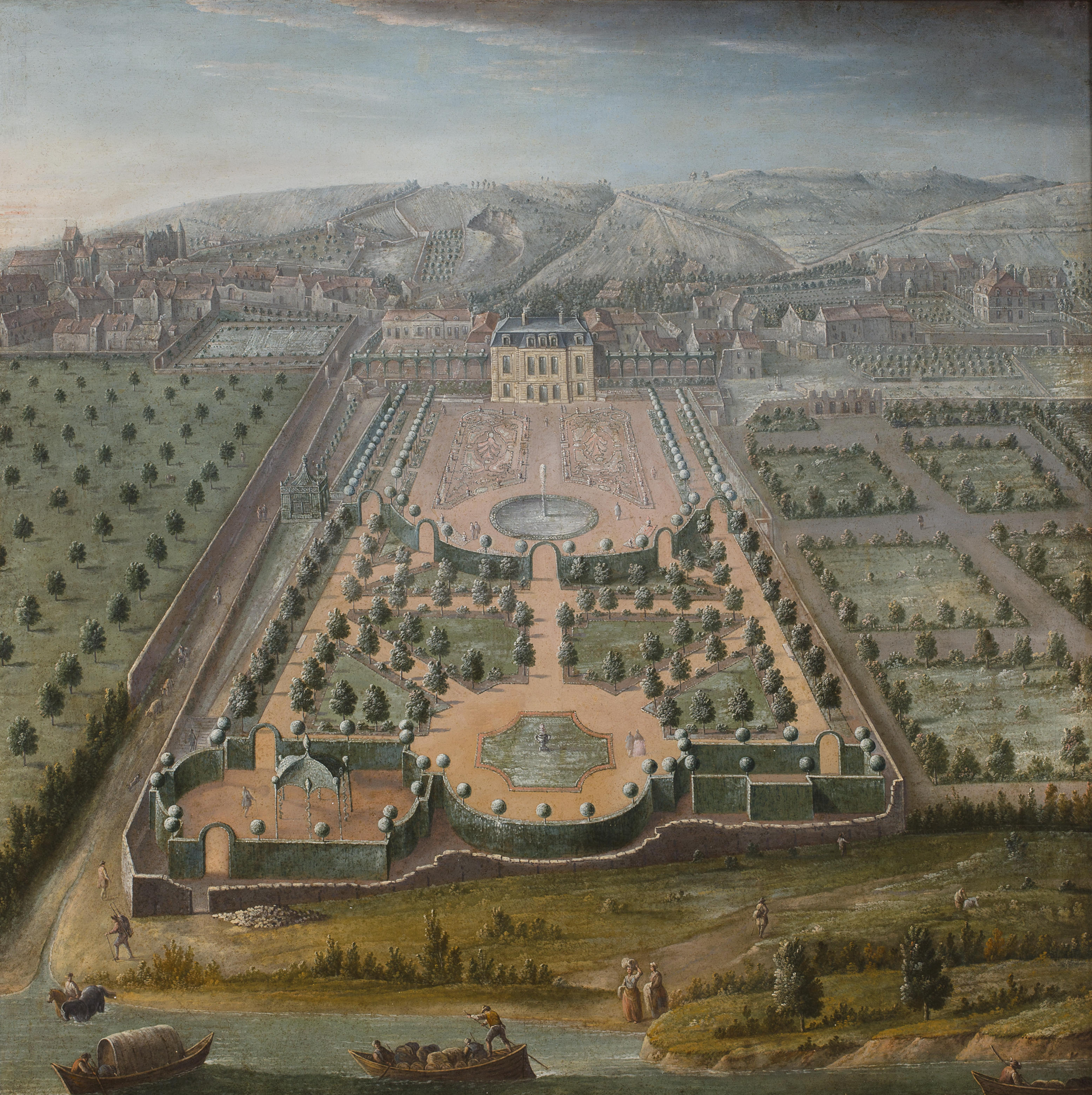
A French estate, 18th century

Jacques Boyceau de La Barauderie wrote in 1638 in his Traité du jardinage, selon les raisons de la nature et de l'art that "the principal reason for the existence of a garden is the esthetic pleasure which it gives to the spectator."

The form of the French garden was largely fixed by the middle of the 17th century. It had the following elements, which became typical of the formal French garden:

- a geometric plan using the most recent discoveries of perspective and optics
- a terrace overlooking the garden, allowing the visitor to see all at once the entire garden. As the French landscape architect Olivier de Serres wrote in 1600, "It is desirable that the gardens should be seen from above, either from the walls, or from terraces raised above the parterres."
- all vegetation is constrained and directed to demonstrate the mastery of man over nature. Trees are planted in straight lines and carefully trimmed, and their tops are trimmed at a set height
- the residence serves as the central point of the garden and its central ornament. No trees are planted close to the house; rather, the house is set apart by low parterres and trimmed bushes
- a central axis, or perspective, perpendicular to the facade of the house, on the side opposite the front entrance. The axis extends either all the way to the horizon (Versailles) or to piece of statuary or architecture (Vaux-le-Vicomte). The axis faces either South (Vaux-le-Vicomte, Meudon) or east–west (Tuileries, Clagny, Trianon, Sceaux). The principal axis is composed of a lawn, or a basin of water, bordered by trees. The principal axis is crossed by one or more perpendicular perspectives and alleys
- the most elaborate parterres, or planting beds, in the shape of squares, ovals, circles or scrolls, are placed in a regular and geometric order close to the house, to complement the architecture and to be seen from above from the reception rooms of the house
- the parterres near the residence are filled with broderies, designs created with low boxwood to resemble the patterns of a carpet, and given a polychrome effect by plantings of flowers, or by colored brick, gravel or sand
- farther from the house, the broderies are replaced with simpler parterres, filled with grass, and often containing fountains or basins of water. Beyond these, small carefully created groves of trees serve as an intermediary between the formal garden and the masses of trees of the park. "The perfect place for a stroll, these spaces present alleys, stars, circles, theaters of greenery, galleries, spaces for balls and for festivities."
- bodies of water (canals, basins) serve as mirrors, doubling the size of the house or the trees
- the garden is animated with jeux d'eau and pieces of sculpture, usually on mythological themes, which either underline or punctuate the perspectives, and mark the intersections of the axes, and by moving water in the form of cascades and fountains.

=== Colours, flowers and trees ===
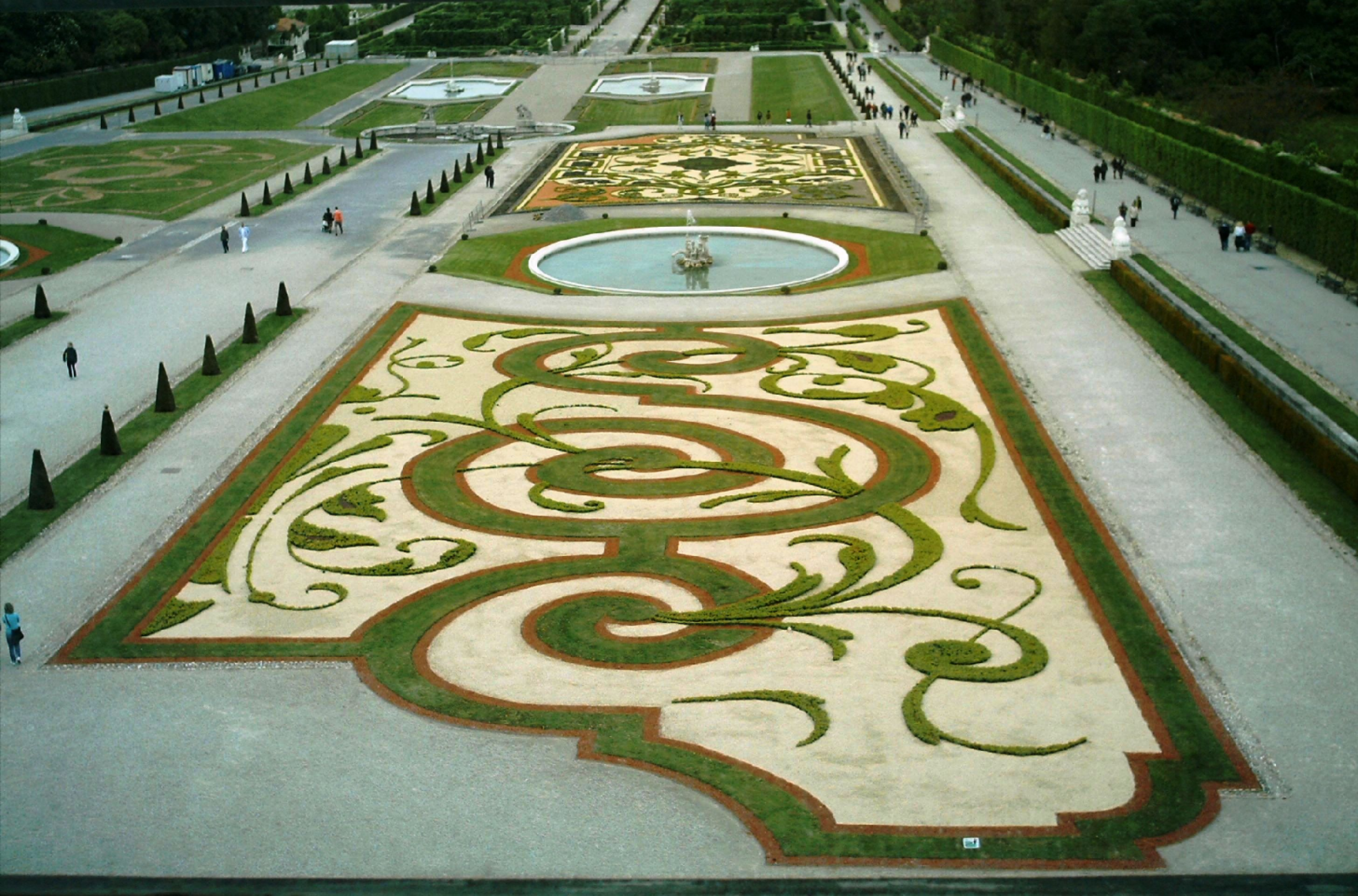
Belvedere Palace's Gardens in Vienna, designed by Dominique Girard, pupil of André Le Nôtre

Ornamental flowers were relatively rare in French gardens in the 17th century and there was a limited range of colours: blue, pink, white and mauve. Brighter colours (yellow, red, orange) would not arrive until about 1730, because of botanical discoveries from around the world brought to Europe. Bulbs of tulips and other exotic flowers came from Turkey and the Netherlands. An important ornamental feature in Versailles and other gardens was the topiary, a tree or bush carved into geometric or fantastic shapes, which were placed in rows along the main axes of the garden, alternating with statues and vases.

At Versailles flower beds were found only at the Grand Trianon and in parterres on the north side of the palace. Flowers were usually brought from Provence, kept in pots, and changed three or four times a year. Palace records from 1686 show that the palace used 20,050 jonquil bulbs, 23000 cyclamen, and 1700 lily plants.

Most of the trees at Versailles were taken from the forest; they included hornbeam, elm, linden, and beech trees. There were also chestnut trees from Turkey and acacia trees. Large trees were dug up from the forests of Compiègne and Artois and transplanted to Versailles. Many died in transplanting and had to be regularly replaced.

The trees in the park were trimmed both horizontally and flattened at the top, giving them the desired geometric form. Only in the 18th century were they allowed to grow freely.

=== Parterres de broderie ===
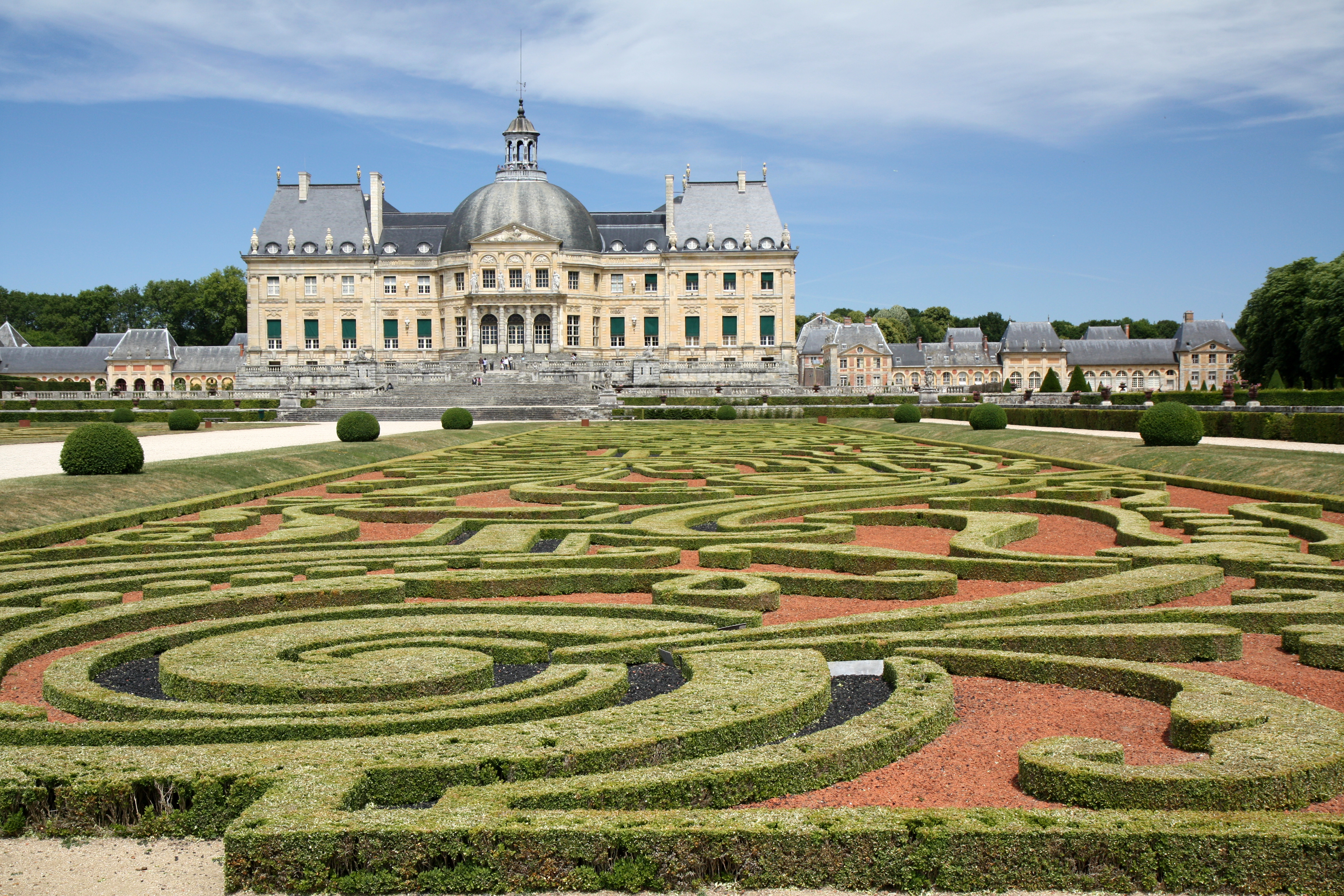
Parterre de broderie at Vaux-le-Vicomte.

Elements of a parterre de broderie (49 seconds, 1.54 MB)

The parterres de broderie (from the French French: broderie meaning 'embroidery') is the typical form of French garden design of the Baroque. It is characterised by a symmetrical layout of the flower beds and sheared box hedging to form ornamental patterns known as broderie. Even the arrangement of the flowers is designed to create a harmonious interplay of colours. Frequently found in French Baroque gardens are water gardens, cascades, grottos and statues. Further away from the country house, stately home, chateau or schloss the parterre transitions into the bosquets.

Well known examples are the gardens at the Palace of Versailles in France and the Palace of Augustusburg at Brühl, near Cologne in Germany, which have achieved UNESCO World Heritage status.

As fashions changed, many parterres de broderie of stately homes had to give way in the 19th century to English landscape gardens and have not been reinstated.

== Architecture ==
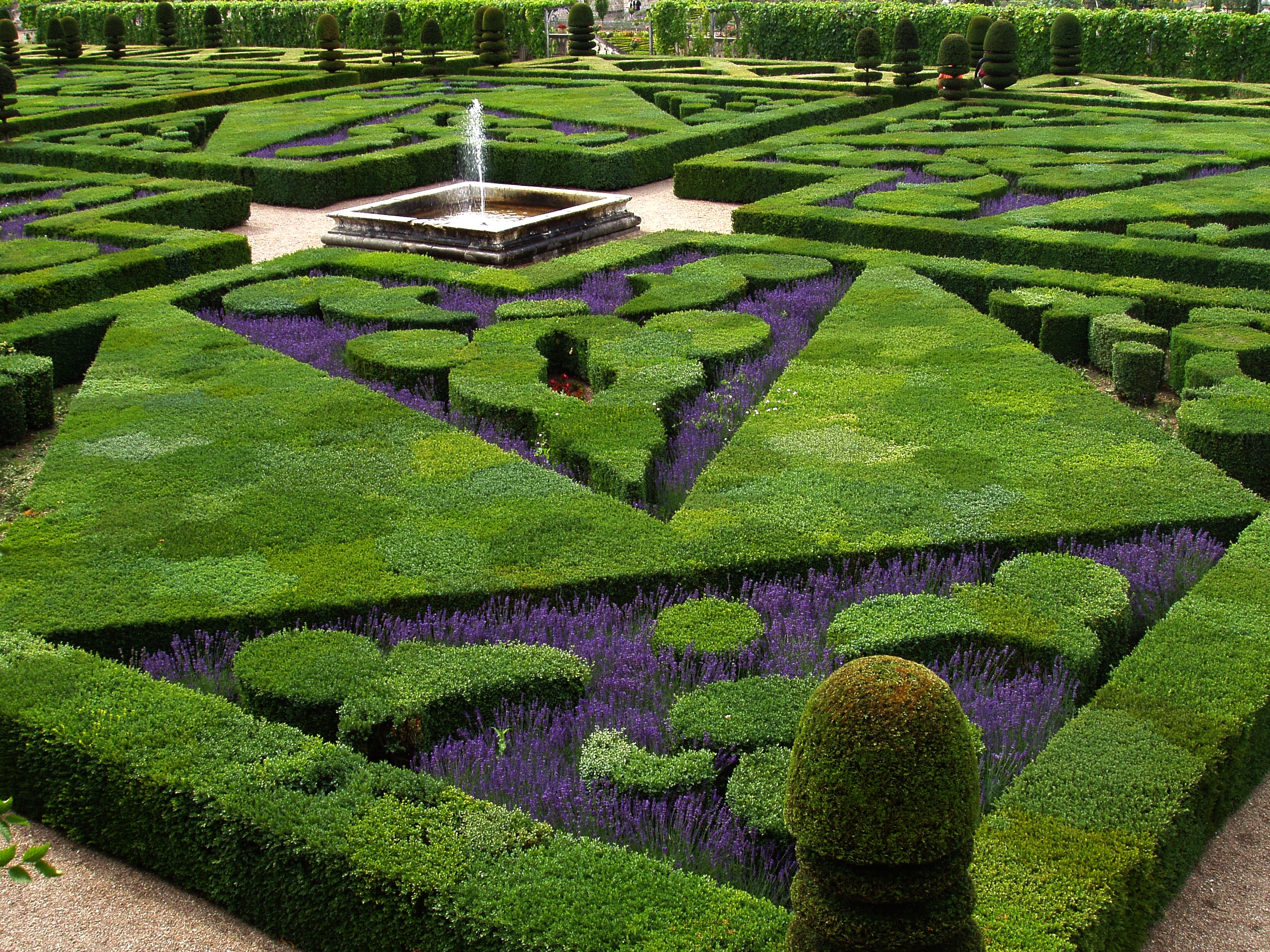
Broderies in the gardens of the château de Villandry (Indre-et-Loire)

The designers of the French garden saw their work as a branch of architecture, which simply extended the space of the building to the space outside the walls, and ordered nature according to the rules of geometry, optics and perspective. Gardens were designed like buildings, with a succession of rooms which a visitor could pass through following an established route, hallways, and vestibules with adjoining chambers. They used the language of architecture in their plans; the spaces were referred to as salles, chambres and théâtres of greenery. The "walls" were composed of hedges, and "stairways" of water. On the ground were tapis, or carpets, of grass, brodés, or embroidered, with plants, and the trees were formed into rideaux, or curtains, along the alleys.

Just as architects installed systems of water into the chateaux, they laid out elaborate hydraulic systems to supply the fountains and basins of the garden. Long basins full of water replaced mirrors, and the water from fountains replaced chandeliers. In the bosquet du Marais in the gardens of Versailles, André Le Nôtre placed tables of white and red marble for serving meals. The flowing water in the basins and fountains imitated water pouring into carafes and crystal glasses. The dominant role of architecture in the garden did not change until the 18th century, when the English garden arrived in Europe and the inspiration for gardens began to come not from architecture but from romantic painting.

== Theatre ==
The garden à la française was often used as a setting for plays, spectacles, concerts, and displays of fireworks. In 1664, Louis XIV celebrated a six-day festival in the gardens, with cavalcades, comedies, ballets, and fireworks. Gardens of Versailles included a theatre of water, decorated with fountains and statues of the infancy of the gods (destroyed between 1770 and 1780). Full-size ships were constructed for sailing on the Grand Canal, and the garden had an open-air ballroom surrounded by trees; a water organ, a labyrinth, and a grotto.

== Perspective ==
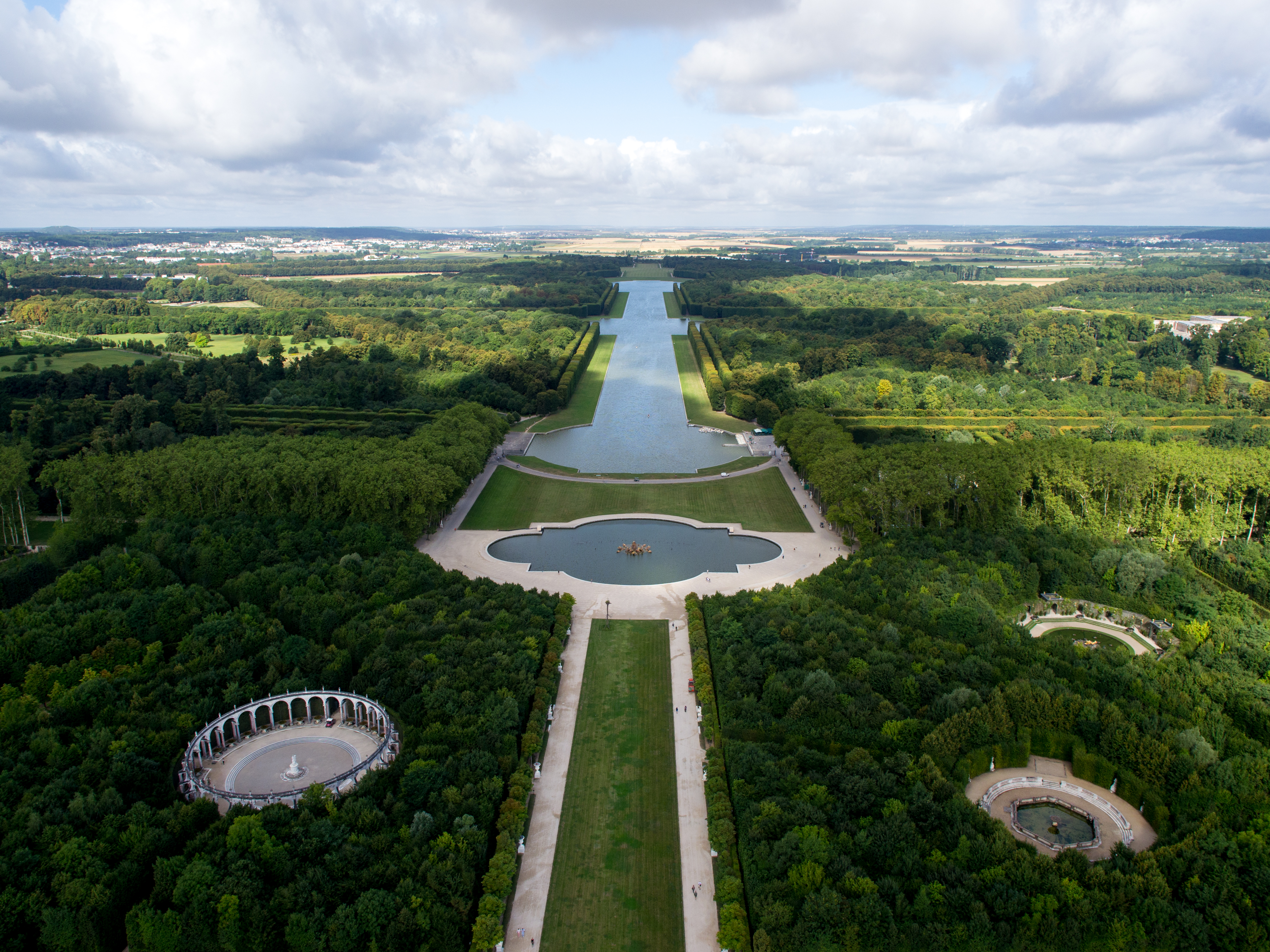
Perspective in the Gardens of Versailles

The architects of the garden à la française did not stop at applying the rules of geometry and perspective to their work. In the first published treatises on gardens, in the 17th century, they devoted chapters to the subject of how to correct or improve perspective, usually to create the illusion of greater distance. This was often done by having alleys become narrower, or having rows of trees that converged, or were trimmed so that they became gradually shorter, as they went farther away from the centre of the garden or from the house. This created the illusion that the perspective was longer and that the garden was larger than it actually was.

Another trick used by French garden designers was the ha-ha (fr: saut de loup). This was a method used to conceal fences which crossed long alleys or perspectives. A deep and wide trench with vertical wall of stone on one side was dug wherever a fence crossed a view, or a fence was placed in bottom of the trench, so that it was invisible to the viewer.

As gardens became more and more ambitious and elaborate through the 17th century, the garden no longer served as a decoration for the chateau. At Chantilly and at Saint-Germain, the chateau became a decorative element of the much larger garden.

== Technologies ==
The appearance of the French garden in the 17th and 18th centuries was a result of the development of several new technologies. The first was géoplastie, the science of moving large amounts of earth. This science had several technological developments. This science had come from the military, following the introduction of cannon and modern siege warfare, when they were required to dig trenches and build walls and earth fortifications quickly. This led to the development of baskets for carrying earth on the back, wheelbarrows, carts and wagons. Andre LeNotre adapted these methods to build the level terraces, and to dig canals and basins on a grand scale.

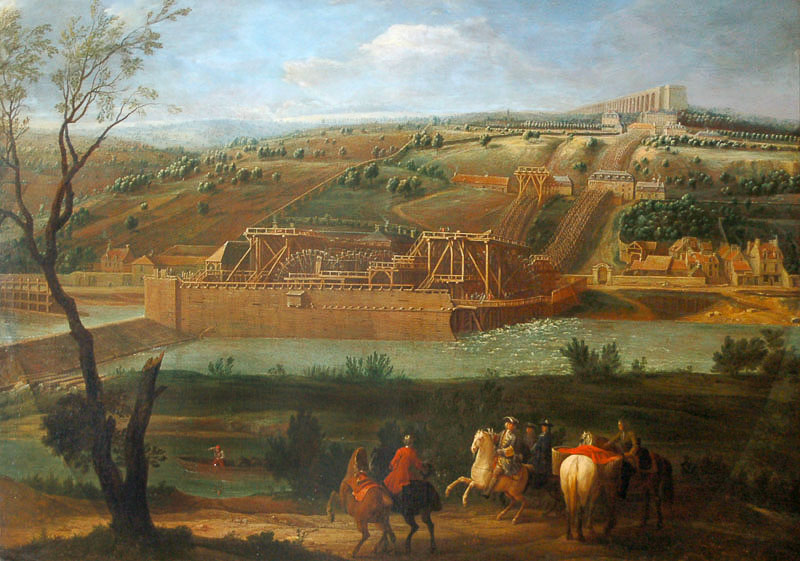
Vue de la Machine de Marly (1723) by Pierre-Denis Martin, showing the Machine de Marly

A second development was in hydrology, bringing water to the gardens for the irrigation of the plants and for use in the many fountains. This development was not fully successful at Versailles, which was on a plateau; even with 221 pumps and a system of canals bringing water from the Seine, and the construction in 1681 of a huge pumping machine, the Machine de Marly, there was still not enough water pressure for all the fountains of Versailles to be turned on at once. Fontainiers were placed along the routes of the King's promenades, and turned on the fountains at each site just before he arrived.

A related development took place in hydroplasie, the art and science of shaping water into different shapes as it came out the fountain. The shape of the water depended upon the force of the water and the shape of the nozzle. New forms created through this art were named tulipe (the tulip), double gerbe (the double sheaf), Girandole(centerpiece) candélabre (candelabra), and corbeille (bouquet), La Boule en l'air (Ball in the air), and L'Evantail (the fan). This art was closely associated with the fireworks of the time, which tried to achieve similar effects with fire instead of water. Both the fountains and fireworks were often accompanied by music, and were designed to show how nature (water and fire) could be shaped by the will of man.

Another important development was in horticulture, in the ability to raise plants from warmer climates in the northern European climate by protecting them inside buildings and bringing them outdoors in pots. The first orangeries were built in France in the 16th century following the introduction of the orange tree after the Italian Wars. The Versailles Orangerie had walls five meters thick, with a double wall that maintains temperatures in winter between 5 and 8 degrees Celsius (41 and 46 °F). Today it can shelter 1055 trees.

== List ==
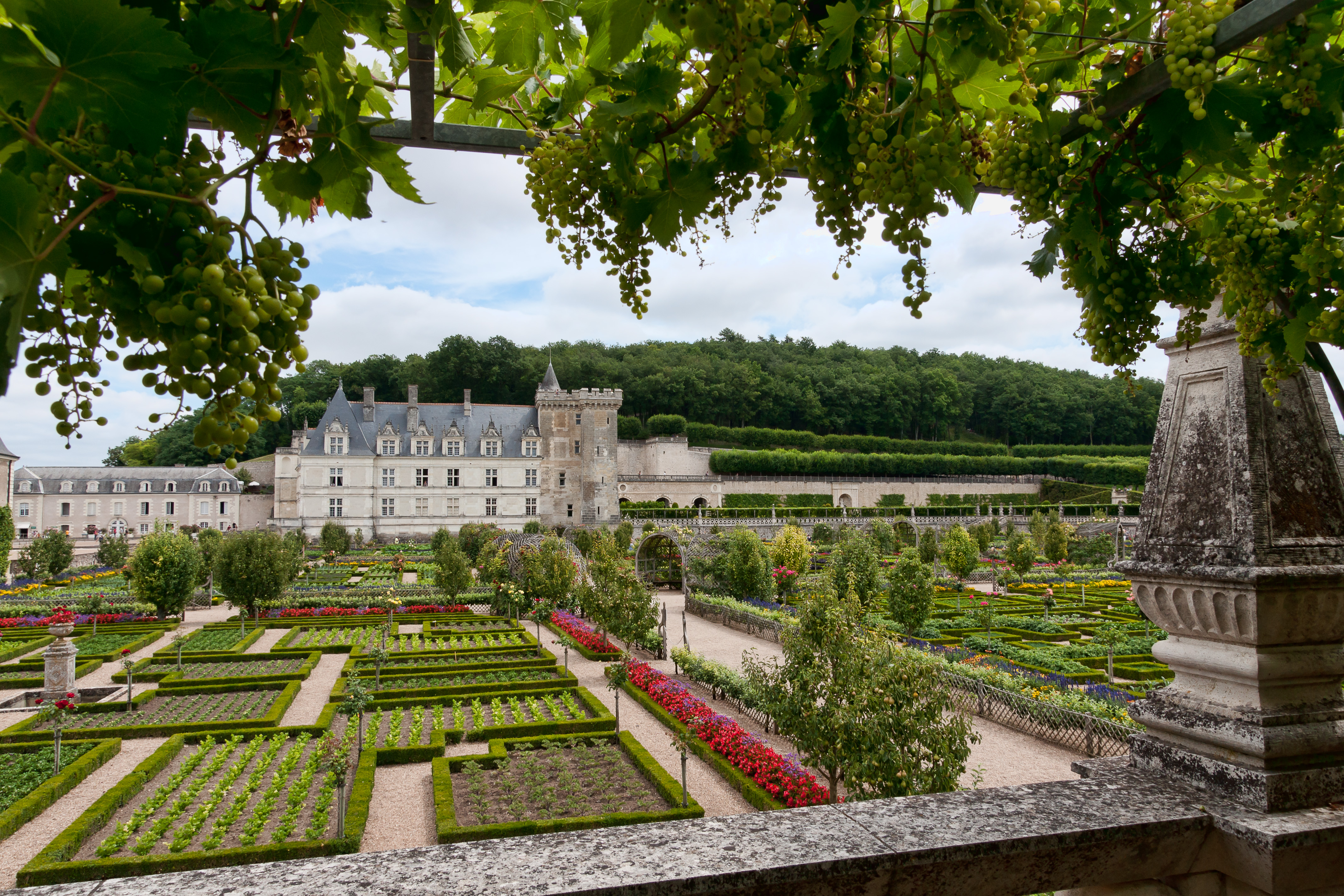
Château de Villandry

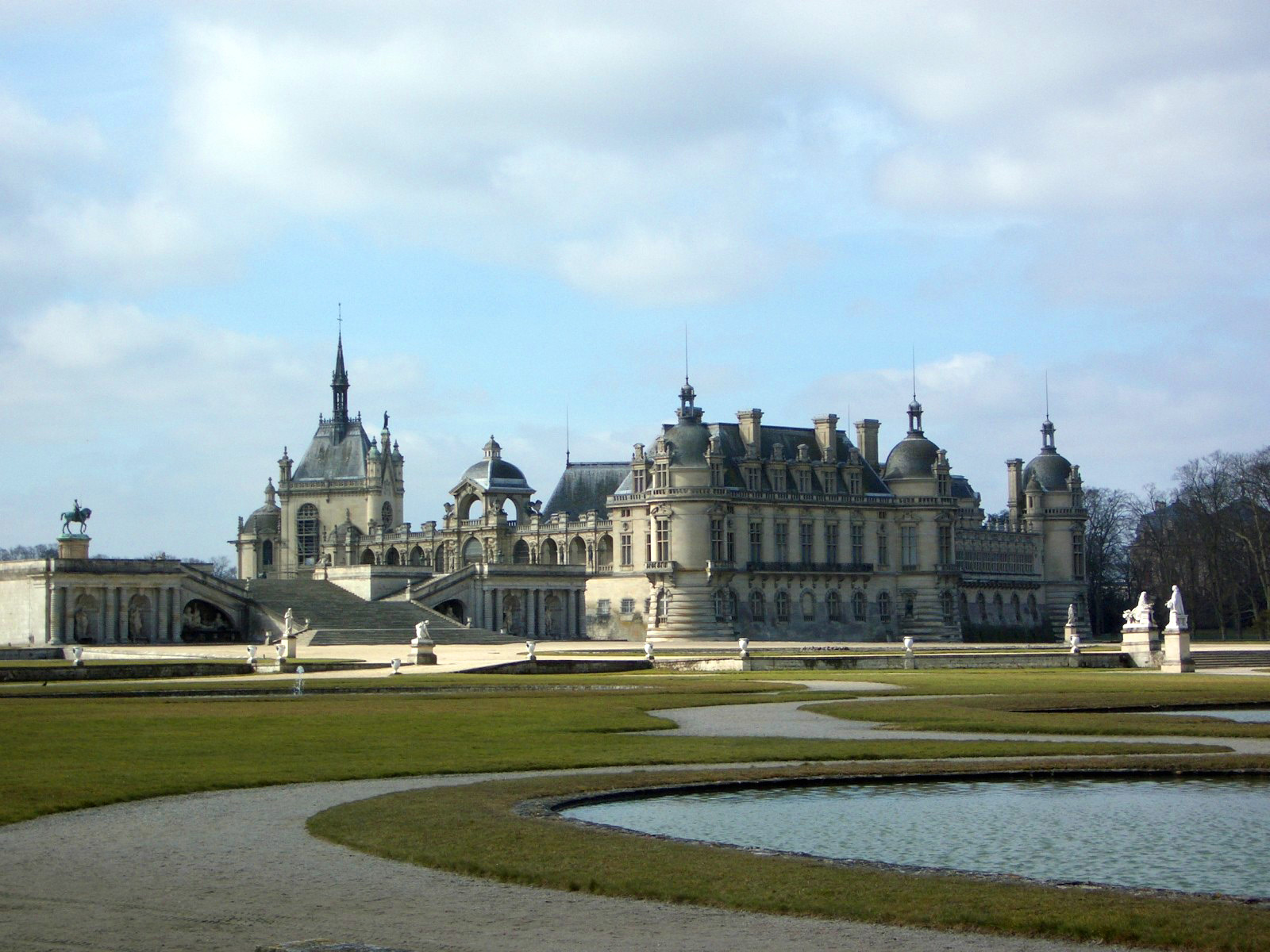
Gardens of the Château de Chantilly

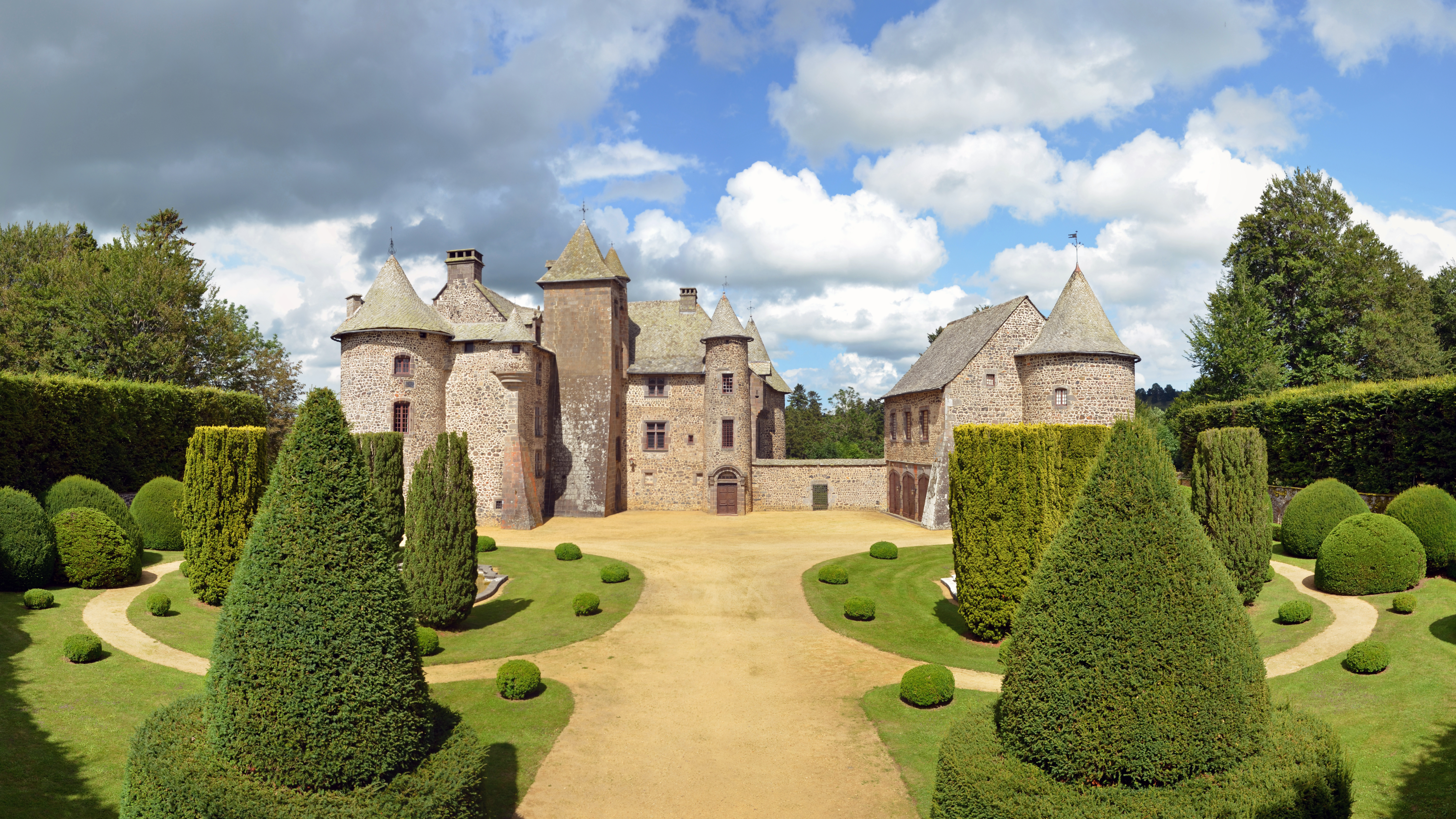
Château de Cordès

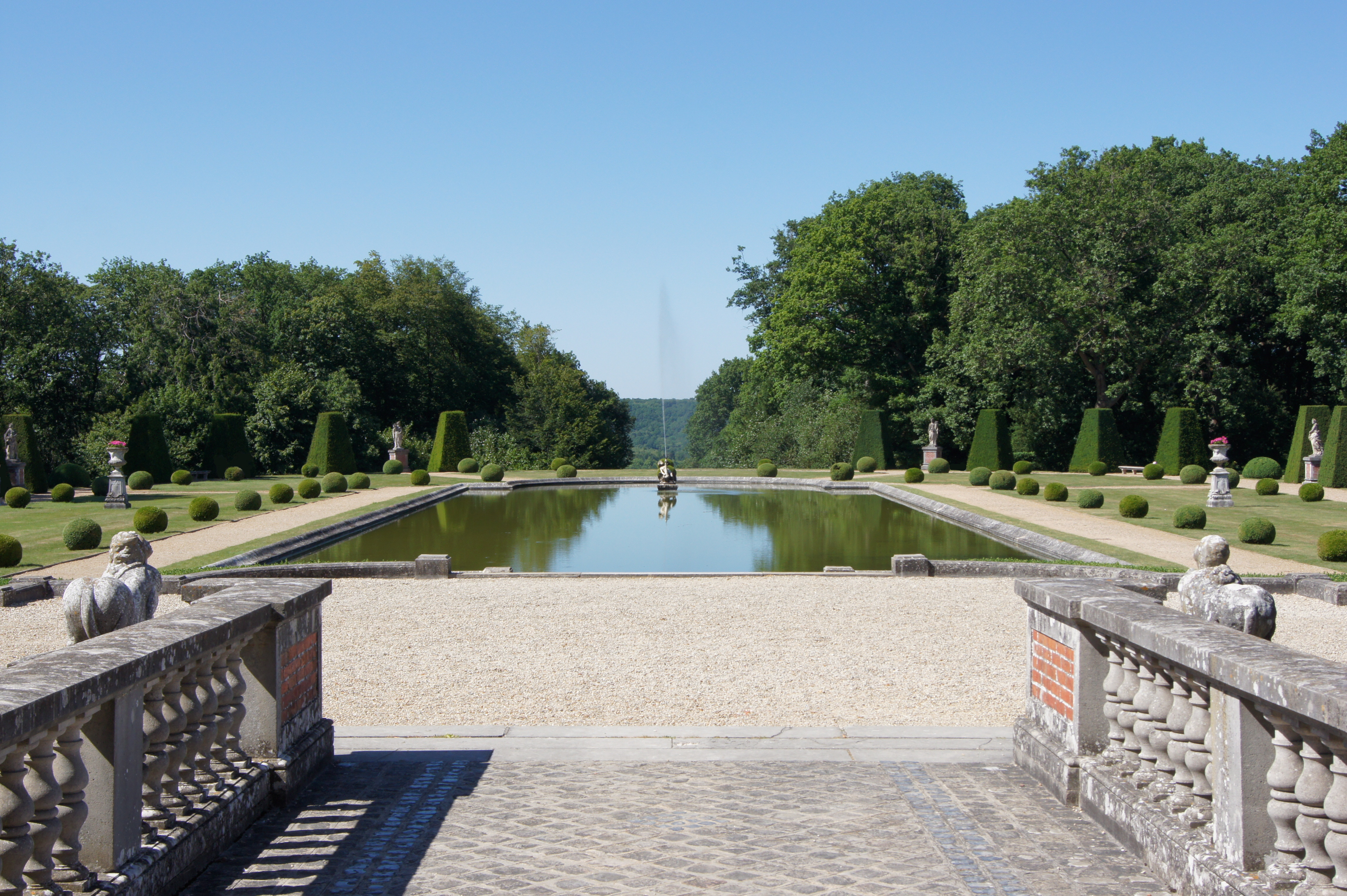
Château de Breteuil

=== Predecessors in the Renaissance Style ===
- Château d'Anet (1536)
- Château de Villandry (1536, destroyed in the 19th century and recreated beginning in 1906)
- Chateau Fontainebleau (1522–1540)
- Château de Chenonceau, gardens of Diane de Poitiers and Catherine de Medici (1559–1570)

=== Gardens designed by André Le Nôtre ===
- Vaux-le-Vicomte (1658–1661)
- Château de Versailles (1662–1700)
- Château de Chantilly (1663–1684)
- Château de Fontainebleau (1645–1685)
- Château de Saint-Cloud (1664–65)
- Gardens of the Tuileries Palace (1664)
- Grand Canal of Gardens of Versailles (1668–1669)
- Château de Saint-Germain-en-Laye (1669–1673)
- Parc de Sceaux (1670)
- Château de Dampierre (1673–1783)
- Grand Trianon at Versailles (1687–1688)
- Château de Clagny (1674–1680)
- Château de Meudon
- Château de Cordès (1695)
- Château de Braine
- Château de Montmirail
- Château de Pontchartrain

=== Gardens attributed to André Le Nôtre ===
- Château du Raincy
- Château de Valgenceusel
- Château de Fages
- Château de Courances
- Château de Castries
- Castle of Racconigi

=== Later gardens ===
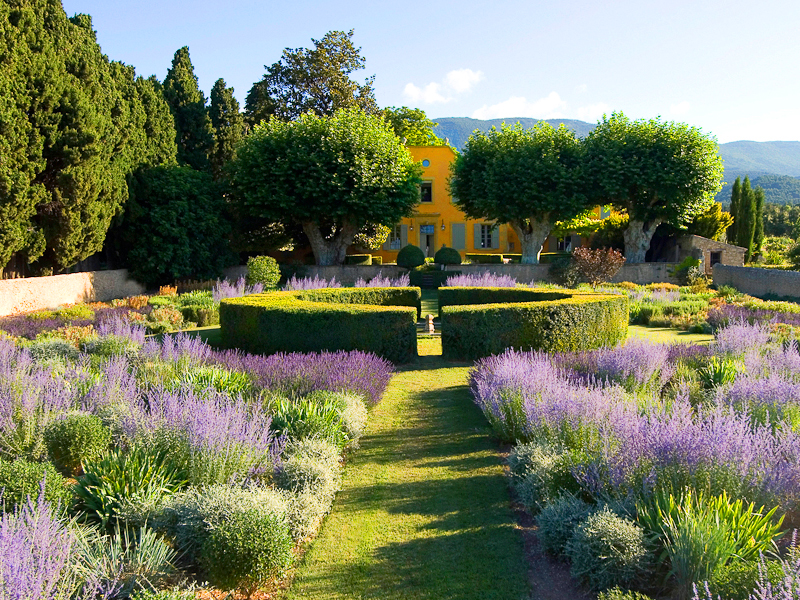
A contemporary garden à la française in Provence: Le Pavillon de Galon

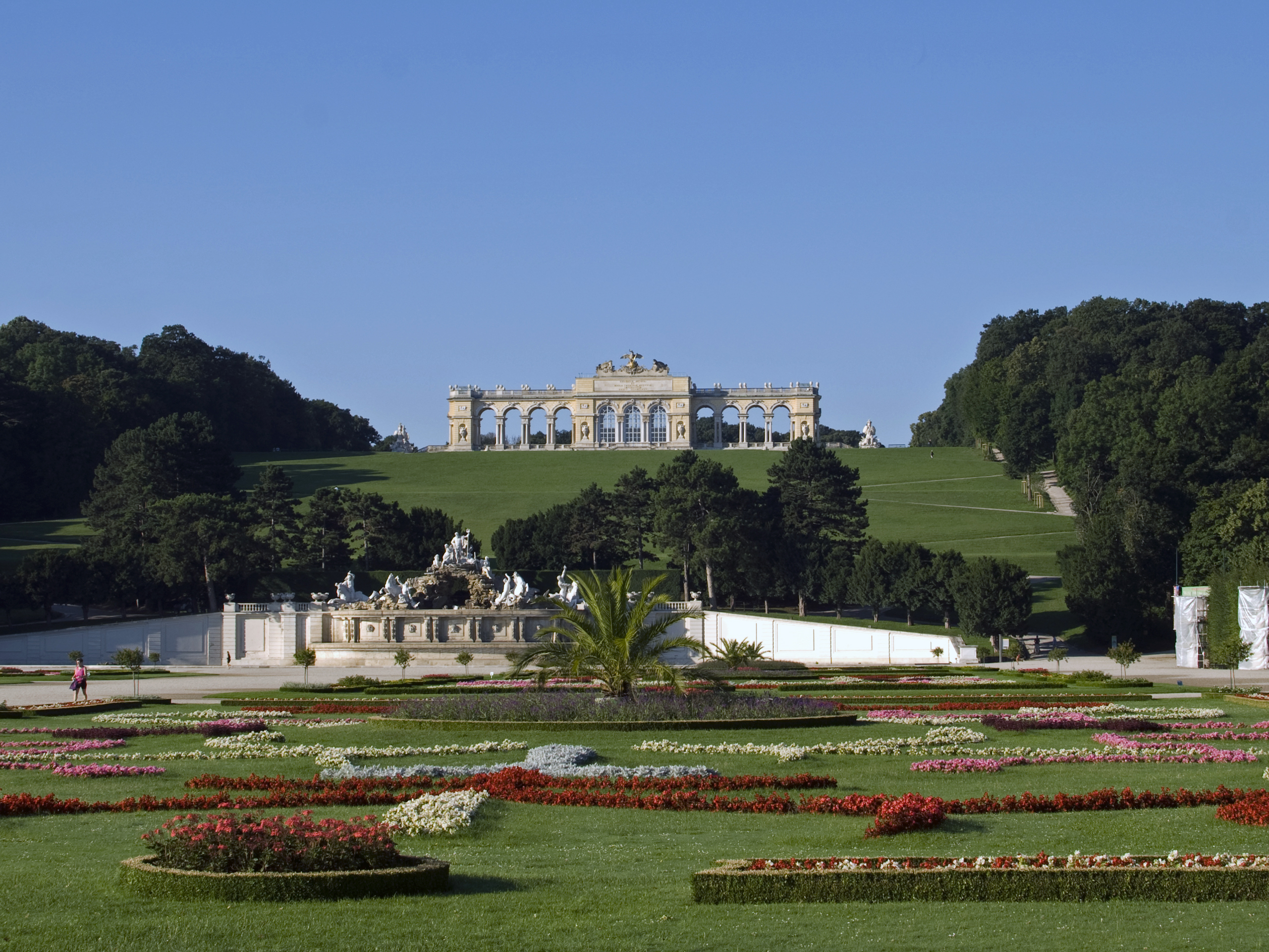
View of the gardens, Schönbrunn Palace, Vienna

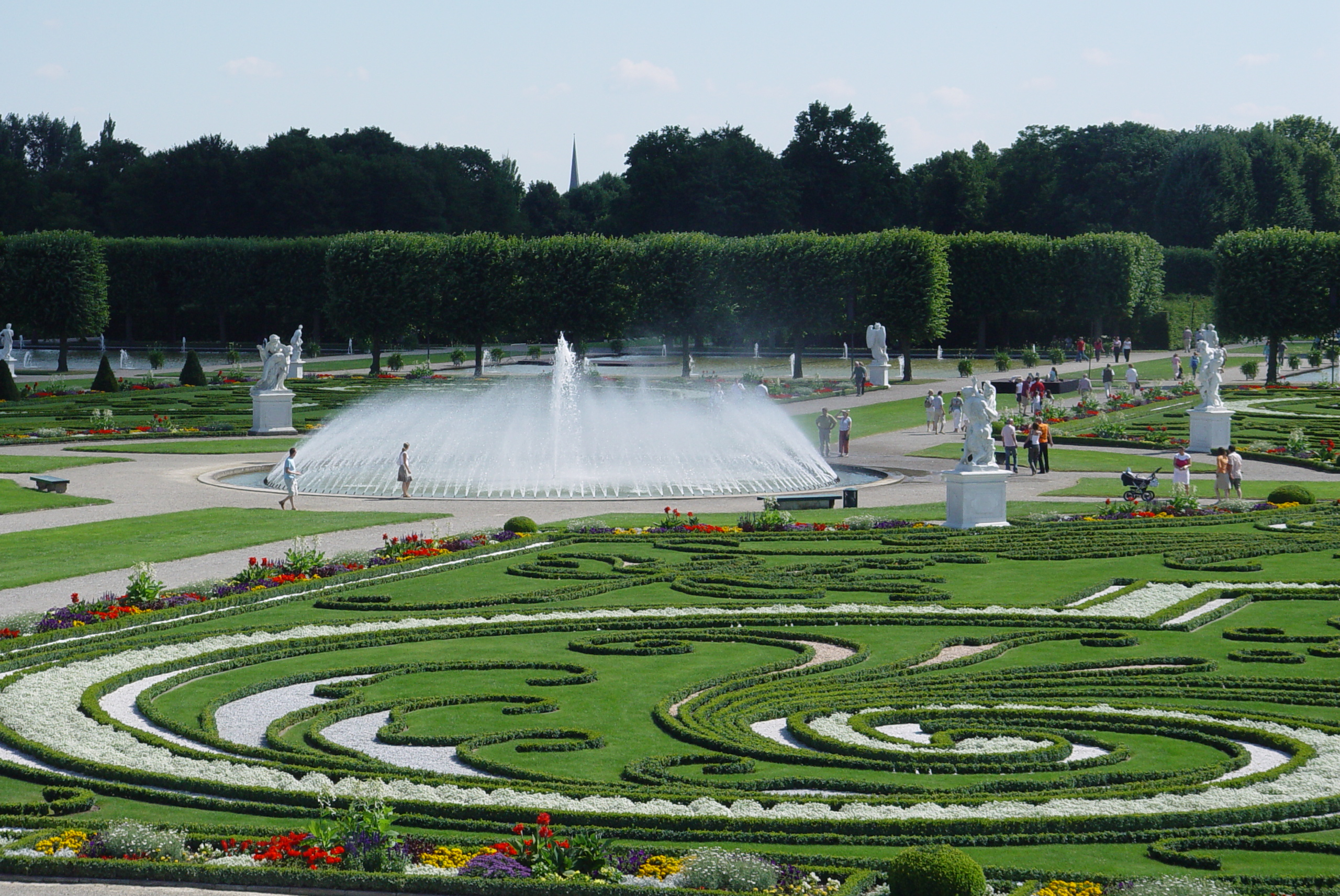
Herrenhausen Gardens, Hanover

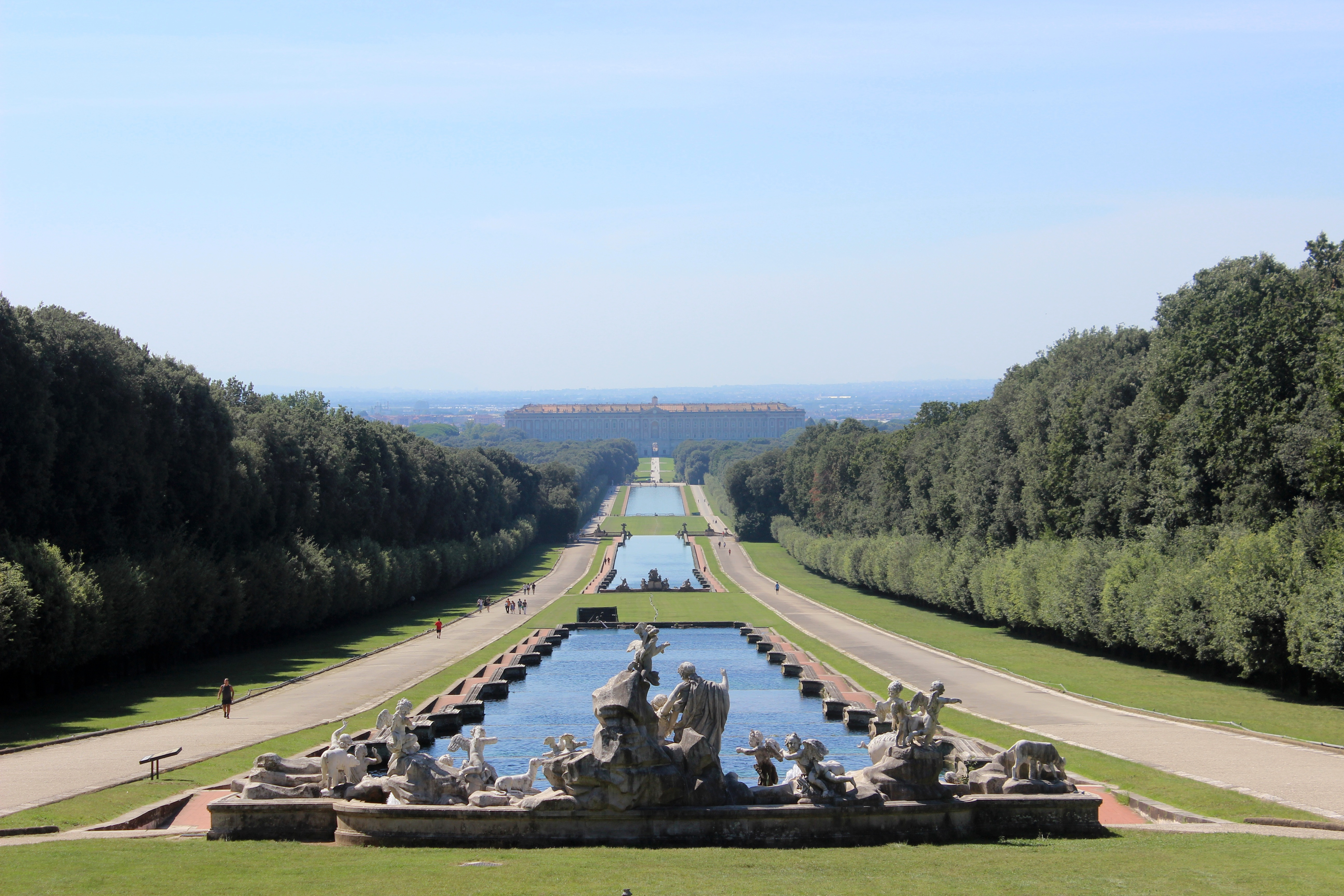
Royal Palace of Caserta

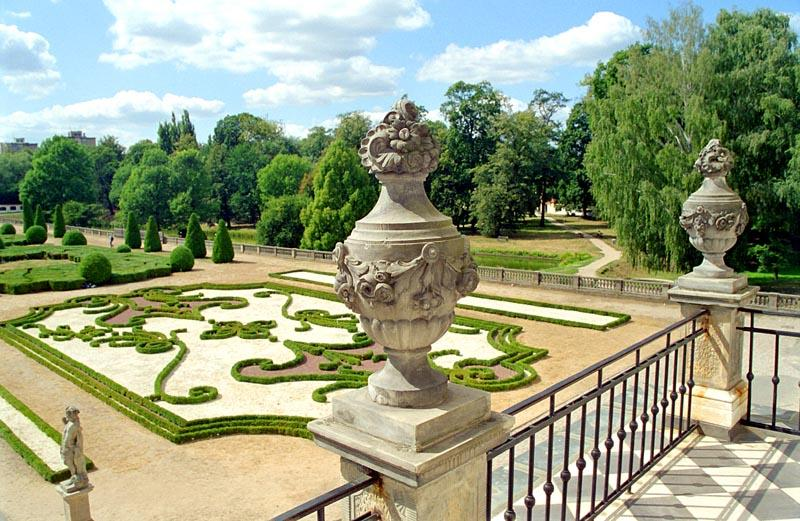
Garden à la française of the Branicki Palace in Białystok

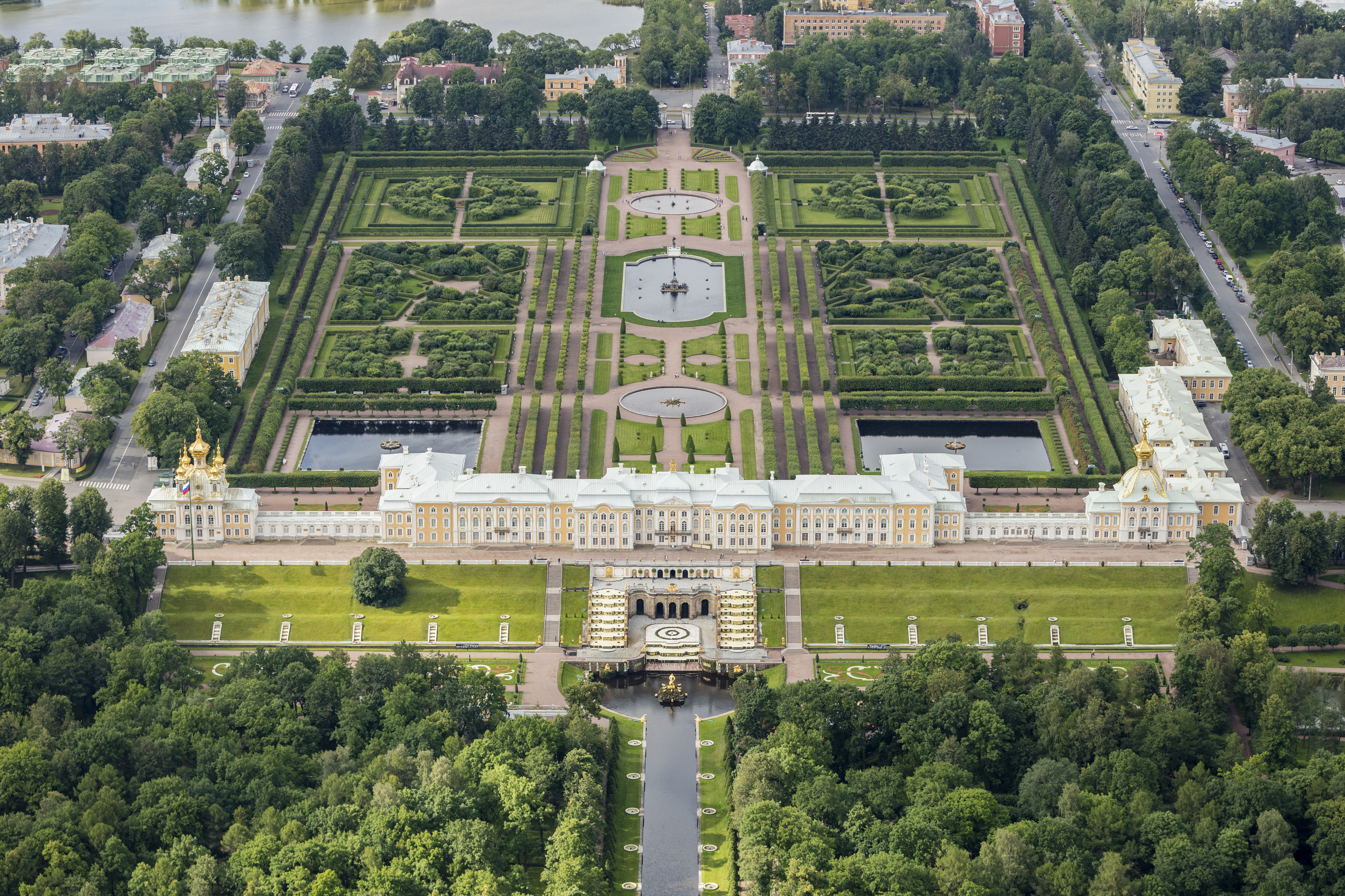
Peterhof Palace, St. Petersburg

- Château de Lunéville (1710–1724, later an English garden, restored to original design in 2003)
- Château de Breteuil (1730–1784)

=== 19th–21st century ===
- Jardin de la Magalone, Marseille, garden by Eduard Andre, 1891.
- Pavillon de Galon in Cucuron, created in 2004

=== Austria ===
- Mirabell Palace in Salzburg
- Belvedere Palace in Vienna (designed by Dominique Girard)
- Schönbrunn Palace in Vienna (designed by Jean Trehet)
- Augarten in Vienna
- Parc of Schloss Hof in Engelhartstetten, Lower Austria

=== Czech Republic ===
- Vrtba Garden, Prague (1720s)
- Gardens of the Wallenstein Palace in Prague

=== England ===
- Blenheim Palace, Oxfordshire (1705–1724)
- The Parterre, Waddesdon Manor, Buckinghamshire (1870s)

=== Germany ===
- Schwetzingen Palace in Schwetzingen, Baden-Württemberg
- Weikersheim Castle in Weikersheim, Baden-Württemberg
- Ludwigsburg Palace near Stuttgart, Baden-Württemberg
- Gardens of the Würzburg Residence in Würzburg, Bavaria
- Schleissheim Palace in Munich, Bavaria
- Nymphenburg Palace in Munich, Bavaria
- Karlsaue, Kassel, Hesse (built until 1785)
- French Garden, Celle in Celle, Lower Saxony
- Herrenhausen Gardens, Hanover, Lower Saxony (1676–1680)
- Augustusburg and Falkenlust Palaces, Brühl in Brühl (Rhineland), North Rhine-Westphalia
- French garden of Schloss Benrath in Düsseldorf, North Rhine-Westphalia

=== Italy ===
- Royal Palace of Caserta near Napoli
- Palazzina di caccia of Stupinigi Palace, Piedmont
- Racconigi Palace, Piedmont (1755)

=== Netherlands ===
- Het Loo Palace in Apeldoorn, Gelderland

=== Poland ===
- Parc of Nieborów Palace, Łódź Voivodeship (designed by Tylman van Gameren)
- Branicki Palace, Białystok, Podlaskie Voivodeship (1737–1771)

=== Russia ===
- Peterhof Gardens, St. Petersburg (1714–1725)
- Summer Garden, St. Petersburg (1712–1725)
- Tsarskoe Selo Old Garden in Pushkin (1717–1720)
- Kuskovo Estate, Moscow (1750–1780)
- Oranienbaum Palace and Garden, west of St. Petersburg

=== Spain ===
- Royal Palace of La Granja de San Ildefonso in San Ildefonso, Segovia

=== Sweden ===
- Drottningholm Palace gardens outside Stockholm

=== United States ===
- Nemours Mansion and Gardens in Wilmington, Delaware

== See also ==
- History of Parks and Gardens of Paris
- Notable Gardens of France
- French gardens in England (The English House)
