= Jardin de la Magalone =

Public park and formal garden in Marseille, France

Coordinates: 43.2616°N 5.3984°E

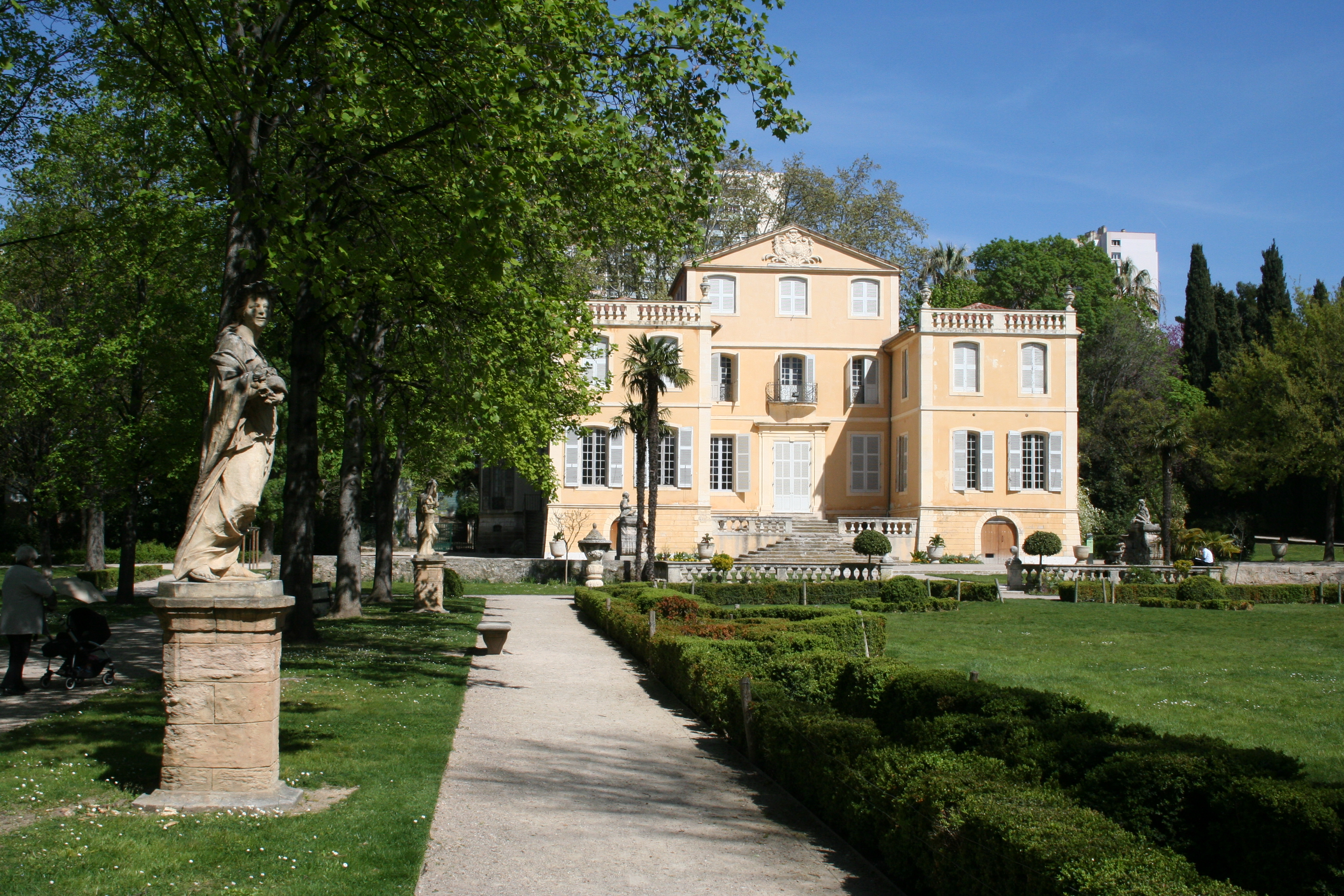
Villa La Magalone in the park

The Jardin de la Magalone (French pronunciation: [ʒaʁdɛ̃ d(ə) la maɡalɔn]; lit. 'Garden of the Magalone') is public park and French formal garden in the city of Marseille, southern France. It is listed by the French Ministry of Culture as one of the Remarkable Gardens of France.

== Description ==
The garden is 1.4 hectare in size, and surrounds an 18th-century bastide, or Provençal manor house. Two terraces, embellished with fountains representing the Rhône and the Saône rivers, separate the house from the garden. The garden is laid out following the principles of a classical French garden, with parterres, broderie of box wood, statues representing the four seasons, and two basins. Rows of tulip trees add to the garden's geometric harmony. The garden is surrounded by trees, which shield it from the rest of the city.

== History ==
The bastide was begun in the 17th century, then resumed in 1713 and continued during the 18th century. In 1891 Madame de Ferry, who inherited the property, restored the bastide and commissioned the noted landscape architect Édouard André to create a modern version of a classic garden. She brought in stone basins, fountains, and statues, five of which came originally from the Château Grignan.

The property was purchased by the city of Marseille in the 1980s. The bastide now is the home of the Cité de la musique, which organises concerts and conferences in the bastide and the garden.
