= French Garden, Celle =

Park in Celle, Germany

Coordinates: 52°37′14.9″N 10°4′58.5″E

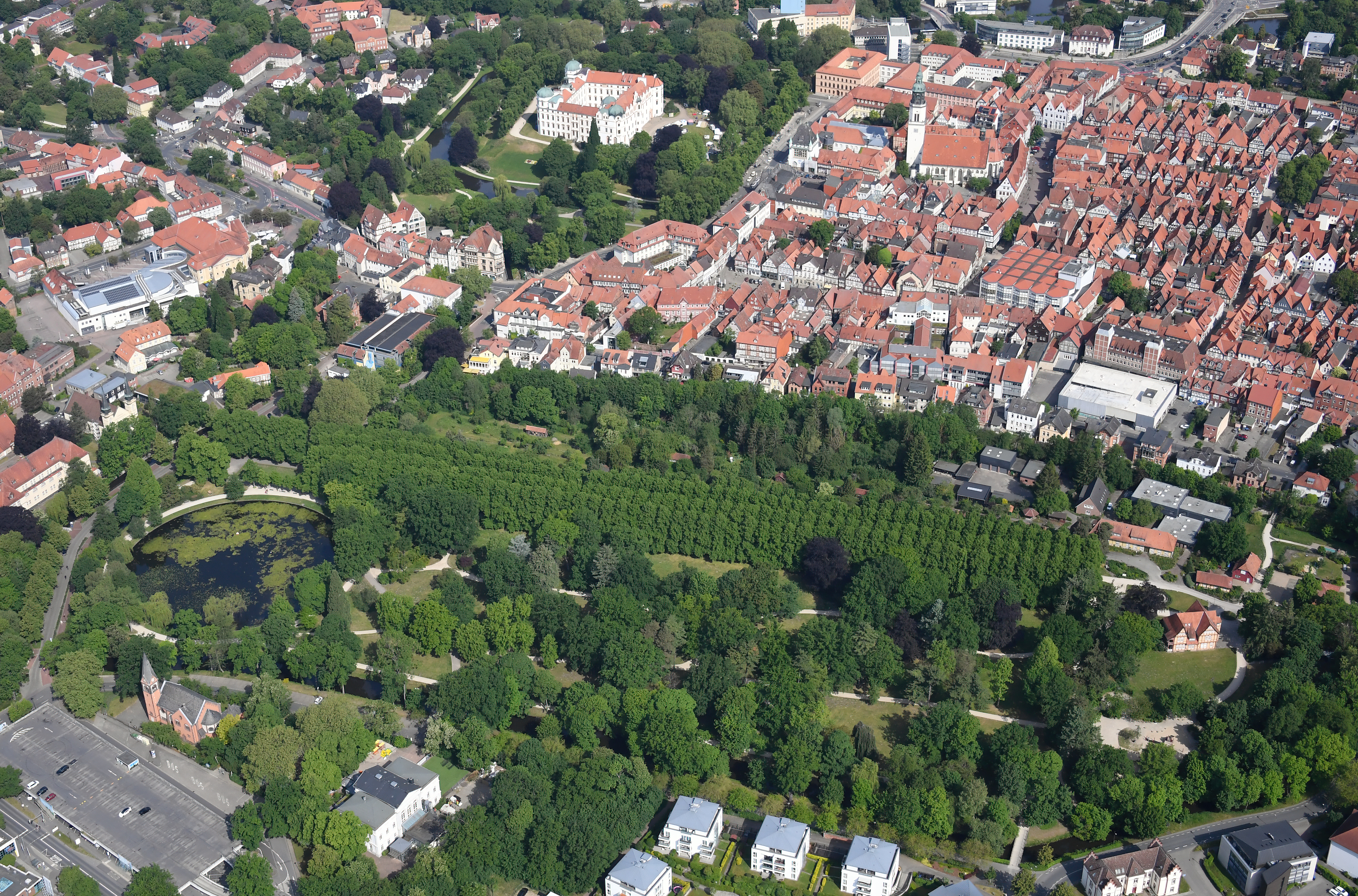
Aerial view of the French Garden

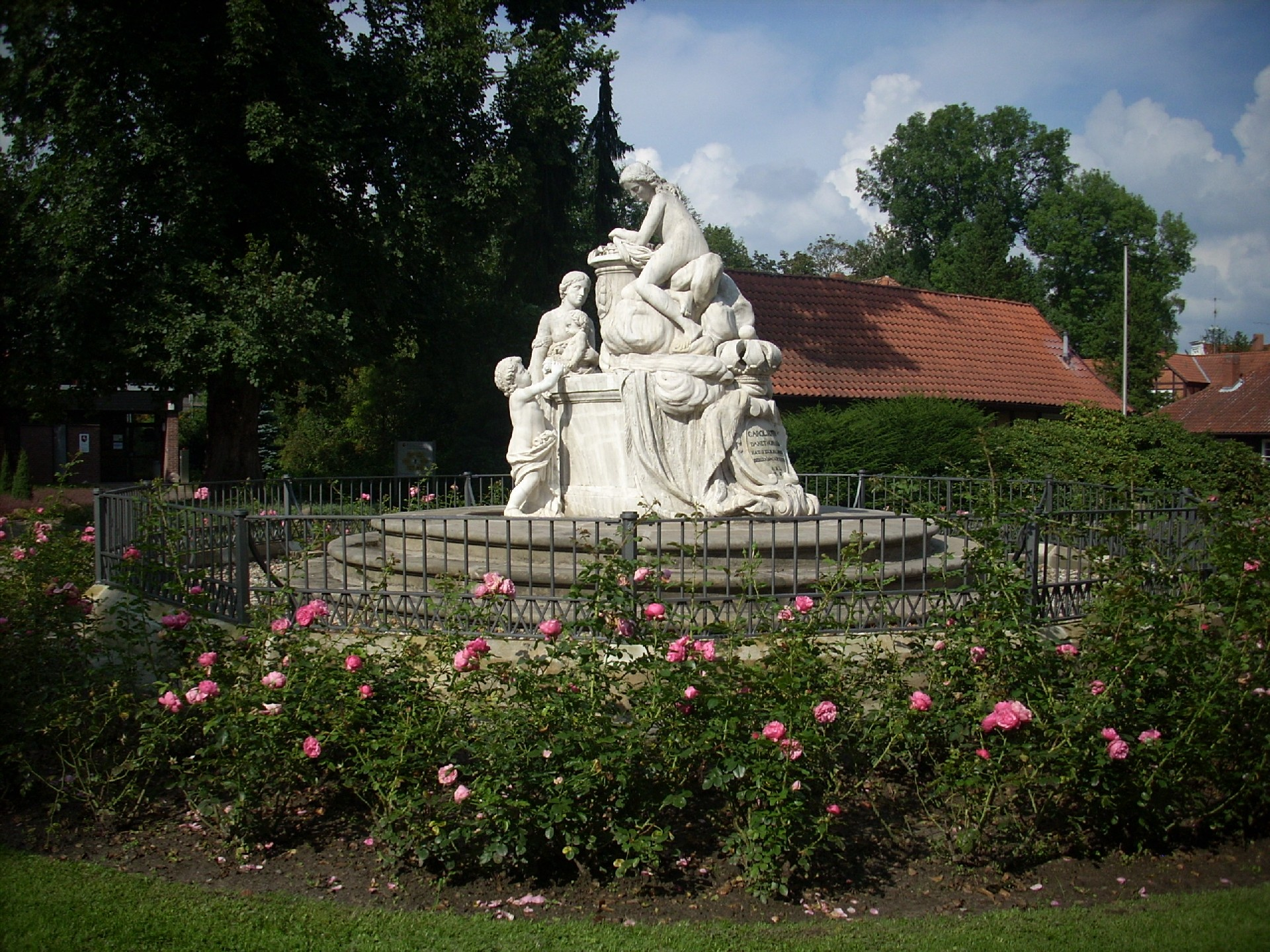
The Caroline Matilda Memorial made of Crottendorf marble at the East Gate

The French Garden (German: Französischer Garten) in Celle, in the German state of Lower Saxony, is a public park in the south of the historic old town or Altstadt. On both sides of a straight avenue of lime trees forming its east–west axis are flowerbeds, lawns, copses and a pond with a fountain. Its current appearance is no longer that of a true French Garden, but rather that of an English Garden. Laid out towards the end of the 17th century as a Baroque courtyard and leisure garden by French gardeners, Perronet and Dahuron, the gardens were given their present shape in the mid-19th century based on plans by the inspector of gardens, Schaumburg.

The French Garden in Celle is a protected historic garden.
