= Château de Cordès =

Castle in Auvergne-Rhône-Alpes, France

Coordinates: 45°42′9″N 2°50′22″E

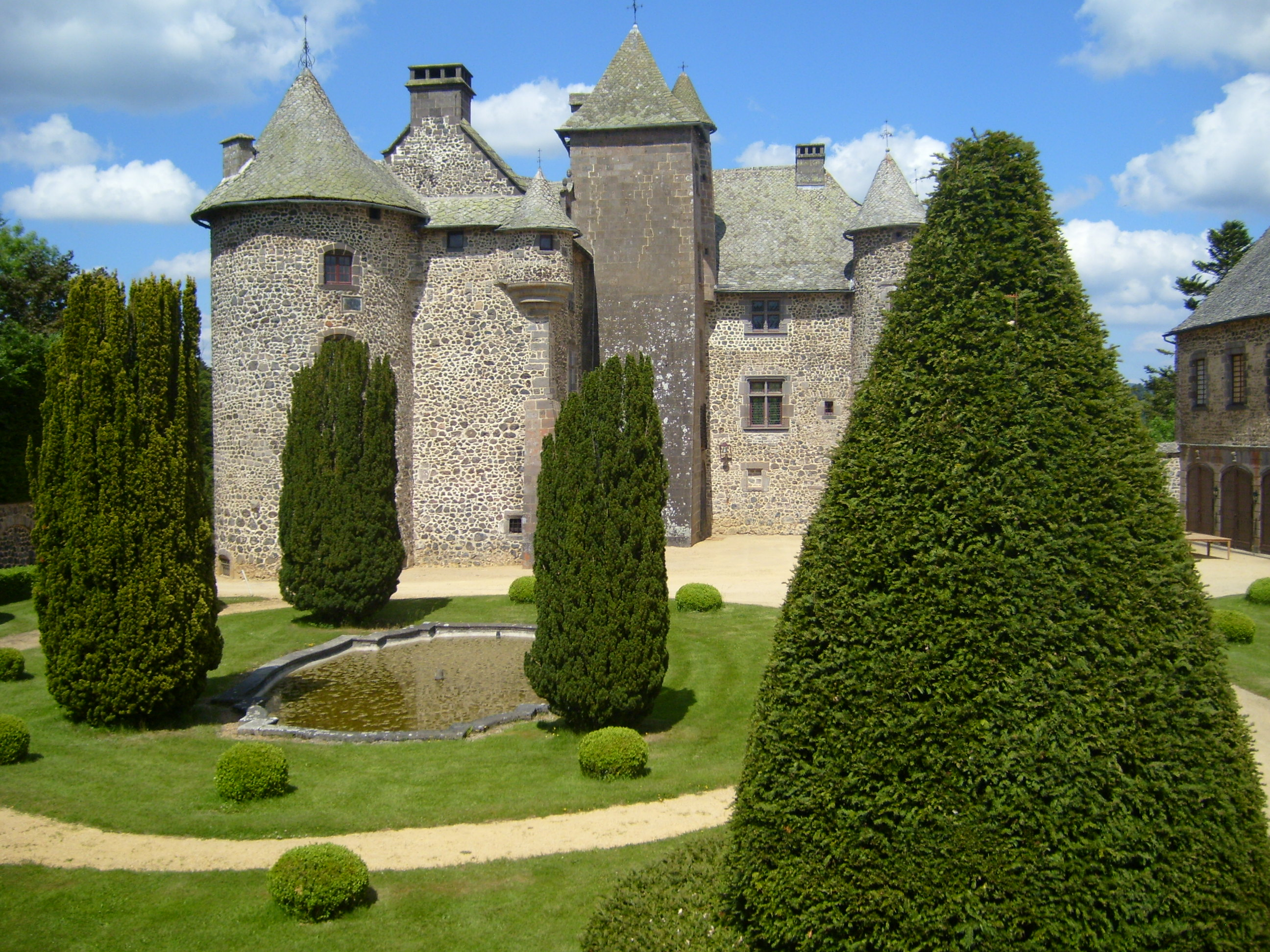
The Château de Cordès

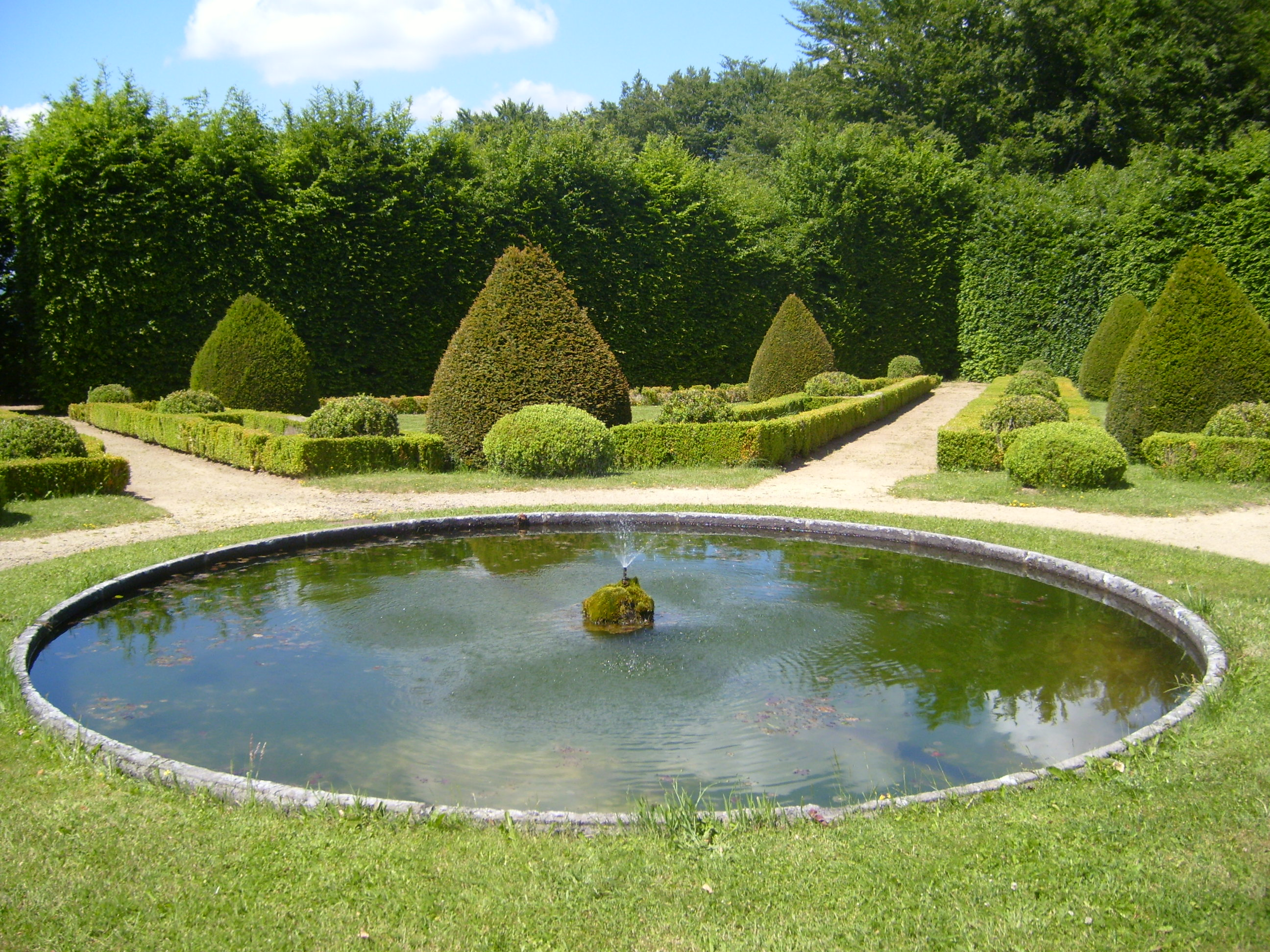
The French Garden

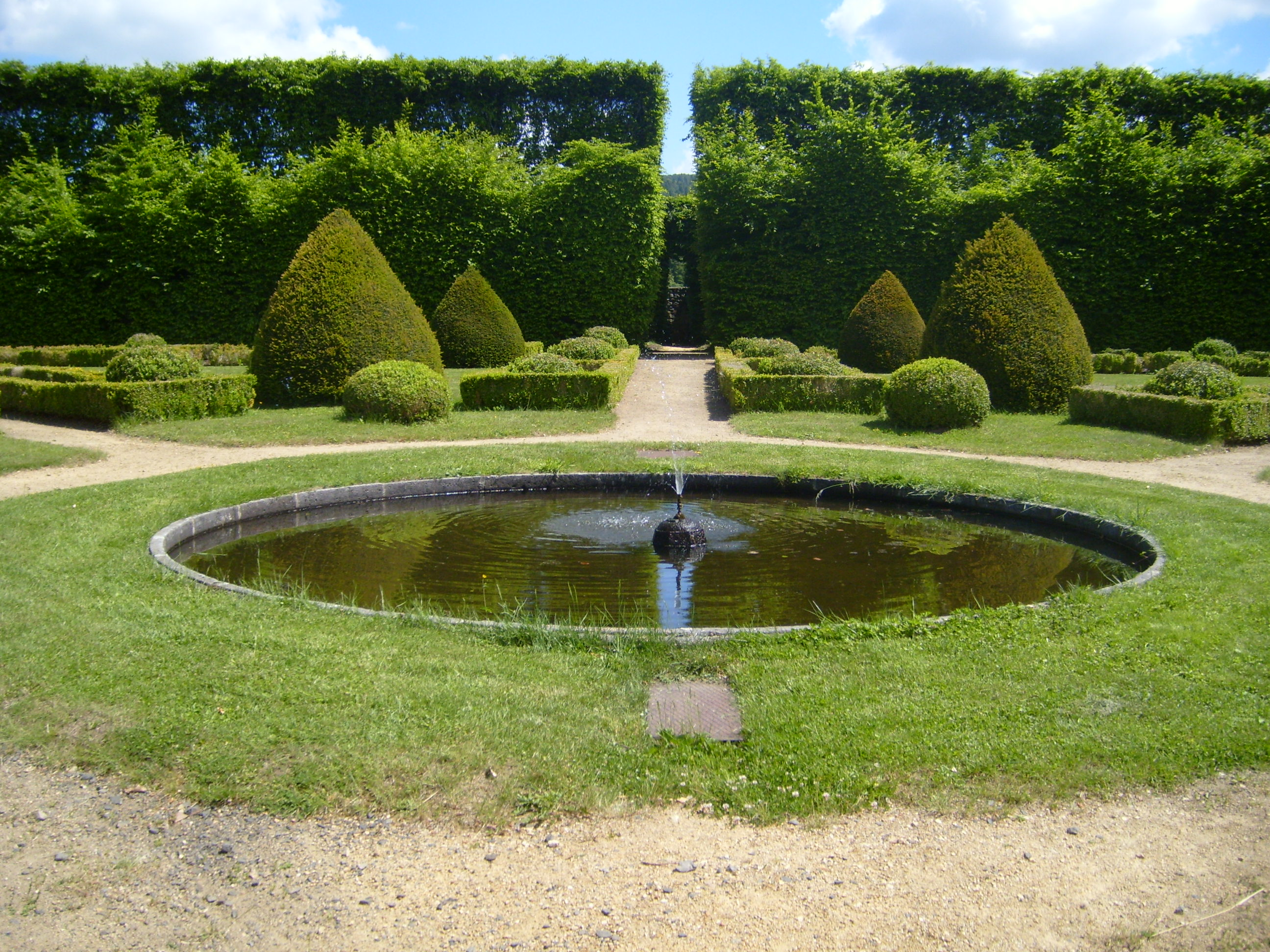
The French Garden

The Château de Cordès is a castle situated in the commune of Orcival, in the Puy-de-Dôme département of France. The château is privately owned, and open to the public. It is classified as a historic monument and the garden is listed by the French Ministry of Culture as one of the Remarkable Gardens of France.

== History ==
The original castle dates from 1268, when it belonged to Guillaume de Chalus, whose family occupied the castle for nearly four hundred years. In 1659, they sold it to Emmanuel d'Allègre. His son, Yves de Tourzel, the marquis d'Allegre, who became a marechal of France in 1724, rebuilt it and transformed it into a residence, and in 1695, commissioned the workshop of Le Nôtre to lay out the garden.

In 1965, the new owner restored the château and recreated the gardens.

Paul Bourget set the action of his novel, Le démon de midi, published in 1914, at the Château de Cordès.

The château has been listed since 1933 as a monument historique by the French Ministry of Culture.

== The château ==
The exterior facade on the Sioulet River side is decorated with machicolation. The interior of the castle contains a Carrara marble altarpiece dating from the 16th century and the sculptured tomb of Yves II. The living room is decorated with plaster work dating from the 18th century.

== The gardens ==
The castle is approached through an alley of hornbeam trees five meters high, with two formal gardens with basins, surrounded by hedges. Next to the castle is a labyrinth with a rose garden in the centre. Directly in front of the castle is a topiary garden.

== See also ==
- List of castles in France
