= Garden writing =

Literary genre

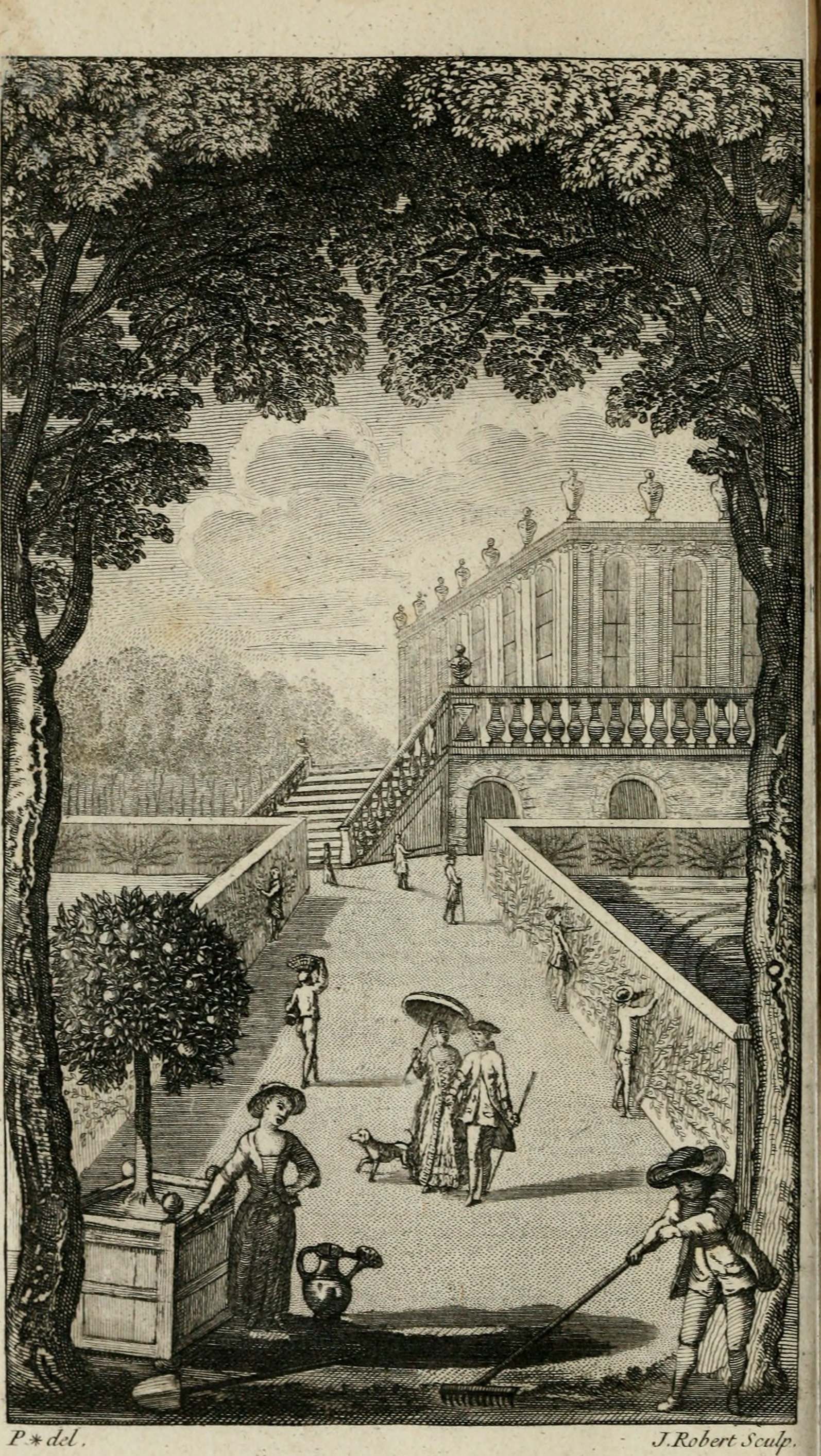
Engraving from a 1774 edition of La pratique du jardinage, a treatise on gardening by Antoine-Joseph Dezallier d'Argenville.

Writing about gardens takes a variety of literary forms, ranging from instructional manuals on horticulture and garden design, to essays on gardening, to novels. Garden writing has been published in English since at least the 16th century.

Atkinson suggests a two-part division of garden writing, at least in the 19th century. On the one hand, she notes, some garden writers produced utilitarian guides on garden maintenance and horticulture. On the other hand, garden writing also included higher-brow works on the "pleasures of landscape aesthetics".

British garden writers are just about able to cover differences in regional climates with the odd reference to "hilly" or "northern" districts, and issue general advice for the whole country; the great majority are based in Southern England. This polite fiction is not tenable for the US and Canada, and much garden writing is regional, taking into account the very different ranges of temperature and rainfall.

== Early history ==
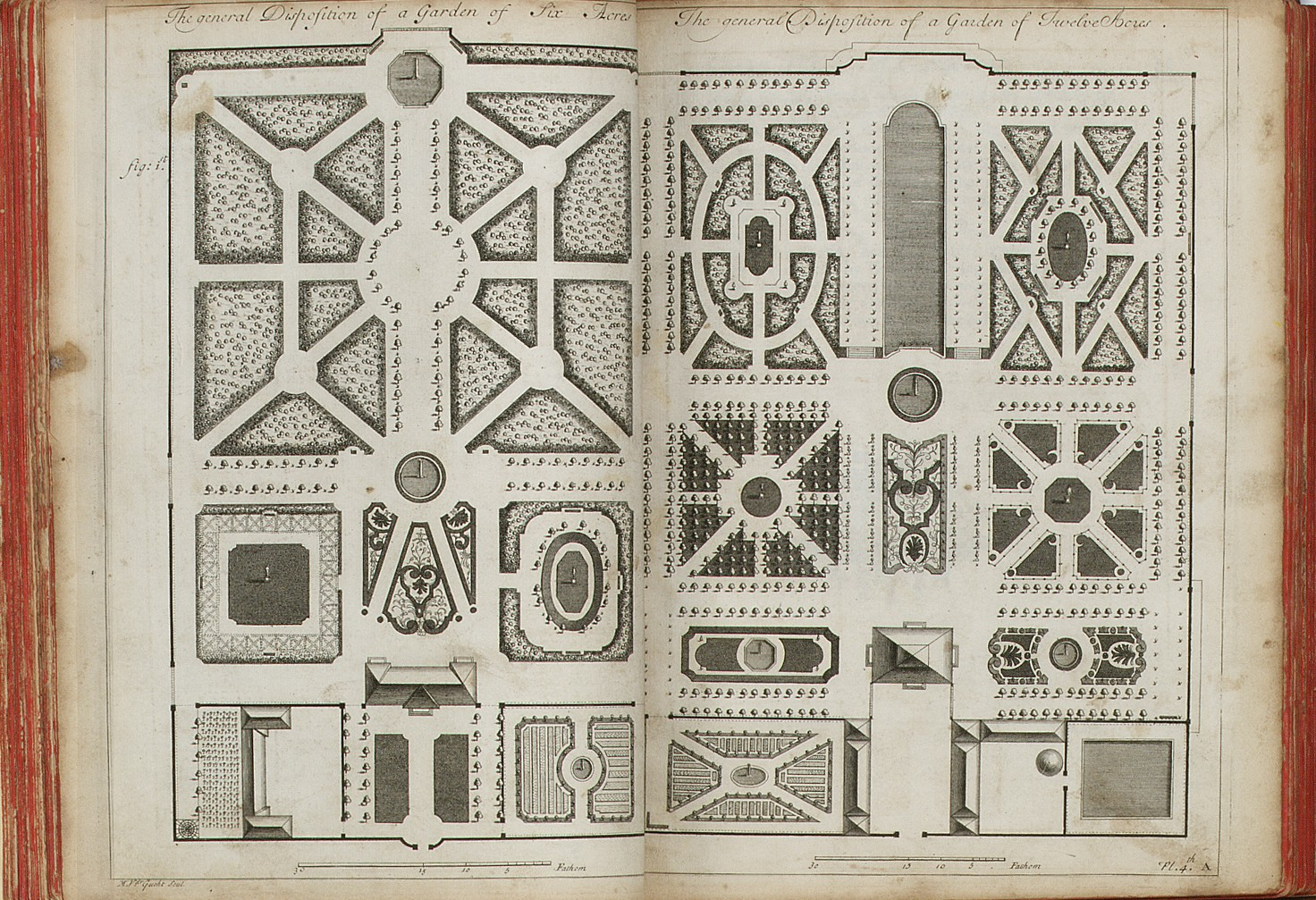
Opening from the 1712 English edition of The Theory and Practice of Gardening - Wherein is Fully Handled all that Relates to Fine Gardens, Commonly called Pleasure-Gardens, as Parterres, Groves, Bowling-Greens &c. Suggested schemes for gardens of 6 (left) and 12 (right) acres.

Early writing, in Latin and Greek, is nearly always more concerned with agriculture, the main element of the economy, than gardening, and there is no surviving single classical authority on techniques of gardening who has the position of, for example, Vitruvius in architecture. Dioscurides is the leading author of herbal literature, with a mainly medical purpose, and much more about how to use and identify plants than how to grow them. After being unavailable in Christian Europe in the Early Middle Ages, he became known again through Arab manuscripts, and then remained the most respected herbal until the 18th century, though even by 1750 only some 400 of the plants he described had been identified and collected. In medieval manuscripts he was often combined with "Apuleius", a late Roman translation of ancient Greek herbal material, revived in England from the 11th century.

The important theologian Albertus Magnus in his De vegetabilibus et plantis (c. 1260) rewrites De Plantis, a book then wrongly believed to be by Aristotle. This is a fundamental philosophical enquiry into the nature of plants, only peripherally concerned with how to grow them. But he does recognize and describe gardens with a large element of purely ornamental planting. The Italian Piero de' Crescenzi's, Ruralium Commodorum Liber (c. 1305) is the most important practical medieval work, still mostly about agriculture, and drawing heavily on classical sources. His experience came from buying a country estate, as a successful lawyer.

The first significant text in English is a translation into Middle English verse, as On husbondrie (c. 1420), of Palladius, the Late Roman author of Opus agriculturae, sometimes known as De re rustica. This covers mostly farming rather than gardening. The first version of Thomas Tusser's poem Five Hundred Points of Good Husbandry was published in 1557, and William Lawson's The Country Housewife's Garden followed in 1608, with a further work in 1618; both were in the library of John Winthrop the Younger, governor of Connecticut 50 years later.

Tusser's books were in simple rhyming verse, and notable for assuming that the gardening among his middle-class audience would normally be the province of the housewife, though many may have needed to have the book read to them by their husbands. Tips and tasks were given for every month of the year. The book was hugely popular and often reprinted, remaining a favourite until 1800 at least.

== 17th century ==
This was the century of growing French dominance in large-scale gardening, and the Mollet dynasty of royal gardeners published books with much on garden design. Claude Mollet (d. 1649), did the garden sections in his friend Olivier de Serres' Le Théâtre d'agriculture et mesnage des champs (Paris 1600), a book mainly dealing with agriculture. Mollet's own Théâtre des plans et jardinages, was published by his son in 1652, after his death, but had been first written around 1613–1615, and some manuscript copies had probably been in circulation.

Claude's son André Mollet (d. before 1665) spent most of his career working for royalty in Sweden, England and the Netherlands. His Le Jardin de plaisir ("The Pleasure Garden") , was published in Stockholm in 1651, illustrated with meticulous engravings after his own designs, and which, with an eye to a European aristocratic clientele, he published in Swedish, French and German. In his designs the rich patterning of parterres, which had formerly been a garden feature of interest in isolation, was for the first time arranged in significant relation to the plan of the house. Mollet's designs coordinated the elements of scythed turf—making its debut here as an essential element of garden design—with gravel paths, basins and fountains, parterres, bosquets and allées.

Among the many subjects that John Evelyn published about, gardening was an increasing obsession, and he left a huge manuscript on the subject that was not printed until 2001. He published several translations of French gardening books, and his Sylva, or A Discourse of Forest-Trees (1664) was very influential in its plea to landowners to plant trees, of which he believed the country to be dangerously short. Sections from his main manuscript were added to editions of this, and also published separately.

He spent much of his later life working on the enormous Elysium Britannicum, covering all aspects of gardening. This was never completed, and was finally published in 2001, from his 1,000-page manuscript now in the British Library (Add MS 78432). Small parts of it were published as he began to realize the main task would never be completed. These included Kalendarium Hortense, or The Gardener's Almanac – a monthly list of tasks for the gardener, Pomona on apples, and Acetaria on "sallets" (salad plants).

The late 17th century saw the height of the French formal garden style, whose best representation in writing had to wait for the next century. The retired English diplomat and politician Sir William Temple wrote an essay in 1685 (first published in 1690), "Upon the Gardens of Epicurus" in his rather enforced retirement. Temple wrote of "the sweetness and satisfaction of this retreat, where since my resolution taken of never entering again into any public employments, I have passed five years without once going to town". As a result of his introducing the term sharawadgi in this essay, Temple has been sometimes considered the originator of the English landscape garden style. Temple was rather typical of his period in England, but perhaps to an extreme degree, in being highly interested in growing fruit trees of all sorts and very little interested in flowers:

I will not enter upon any Account of Flowers, having pleased myself only with seeing and smelling them, and not troubled myself with the Care, which is more the Ladies Part than the Mens; but the Success is wholly in the Gardener.

== 18th century ==
In France, the lawyer Antoine-Joseph Dézallier d'Argenville first published La théorie et la pratique du jardinage (French for 'The Theory and Practice of Gardening') in 1709. It had been translated into English by 1712. Since none of the leading gardeners in the French formal garden style left books, this remained the leading manual on the style, and perhaps the last time a foreign gardening book was very popular in English. It was a large and expensive book, with many excellent images, designed mainly for the large gardens of English country houses.

Gardening had become a major preoccupation of the English upper classes in the late 17th century, and was spreading to the middle classes. The 18th century saw a great increase in books by English authors, by no means all just covering the new English landscape garden style. In the 1710s the highly influential essayist Joseph Addison, often touched on gardening, though his practical experience was virtually nil. He favoured a looser style, though still fairly formal.

Stephen Switzer (1682–1745) was an English gardener, whose first and most general title was Ichnographica Rustica, or The Nobleman, Gentleman, and Gardener's recreation (1715–18). He is most notable for his views of the transition between the large garden, still very formal in his writings, and the surrounding countryside, especially woodland. The book came rather too early for the flood of new American trees and shrubs that led to the development of the shrubbery a generation later, and subsequently the woodland garden, and Switzer's schemes for the more distant parts of sites from the house seem to have firmly remained woodland rather than garden. Like many later gardening writers, his views are often expressed with more intemperate fervour than clarity, as when he poured scorn on "several Northern Lads which...by the help of a little Learning, and a great deal of Impudence... invade the Southern provinces and ...pretend to know more in one Twelve-month, than a laborious, honest Southern Countryman does in Seven Years....".

Batty Langley (1696–1751) another professional gardener and garden designer, published three gardening books in 1728–29, with his many later works covering building and architecture. He reflected the desire for increased freedom in planting and (lack of) trimming trees and hedges, but somewhat cautiously. His books were at least as popular as those of Switzer, but much the most popular book of the century was The Gardeners Dictionary by Philip Miller, first published in 1729 and regularly appearing in new revised and expanded editions until 1768, with another version "based on" it in the 1830s. Miller was chief gardener at the Chelsea Physic Garden, a famous foundation in London, for almost 50 years, and was a plantsman rather than a designer, who played an important part in the influx of new foreign plants to English gardening.

The English landscape style was not fully described until George Mason's Essay on Design in Gardening in 1768, soon followed by the far more influential, Observations on Modern Gardening, illustrated by descriptions in 1770, by the lawyer and politician Thomas Whately, which was translated into German and French the following year. This was a very early example of a book largely devoted to describing a series of individual gardens, a sub-genre that came into its own when good quality colour photography became relatively cheap, in the mid-20th century. Thomas Jefferson had a copy of Whately, and his Garden Notes, recording his garden tour in England, in the company of John Adams, begins:

Memorandums made on a tour to some of the gardens in England described by Whateley in his book on gardening. While his descriptions in point of style are models of perfect elegance and classical correctness, they are as remarkeable for their exactness. I always walked over the gardens with his book in my hand, examined with attention the particular spots he described, found them so justly characterised by him as to be easily recognised, and saw with wonder, that his fine imagination had never been able to seduce him from the truth.

The first gardening book written by a woman was A curious herbal: containing five hundred cuts, of the most useful plants, which are now used in the practice of physick, by Elizabeth Blackwell. Though she is credited as the sole author, she was an illustrator, and her husband Alexander probably did much of the text, from debtor's prison. The book was successful enough to repay his debts and get him out, but he went to Sweden in 1742, where he was executed in 1747 for a mysterious plot against the crown, of which he was probably innocent. As a herbal, the book marked "the last of a genre", although later editions of the most famous, The English Physitian (1652), by the doctor Nicholas Culpeper later entitled The Complete Herbal or Culpepper's Herbal, continued to be printed for centuries after.

Horace Walpole's short Essay on Modern Gardening (1782) was highly polemical, and gave an account of the development of the English landscape style that saw William Kent as its essential creator, and played down Capability Brown and other gardeners of the mid-century. This was very influential but is now rejected by modern garden historians. Humphrey Repton, Brown's successor as the leading English garden designer, published three main books on gardening: Sketches and Hints on Landscape Gardening (1794), Observations on the Theory and Practice of Landscape Gardening (1803), and Fragments on the Theory and Practice of Landscape Gardening (1816). He defended the designs of Brown and himself against criticism from Richard Payne Knight, Uvedale Price and others, in the lively contemporary controversies over the concept of the picturesque.

== 19th century ==
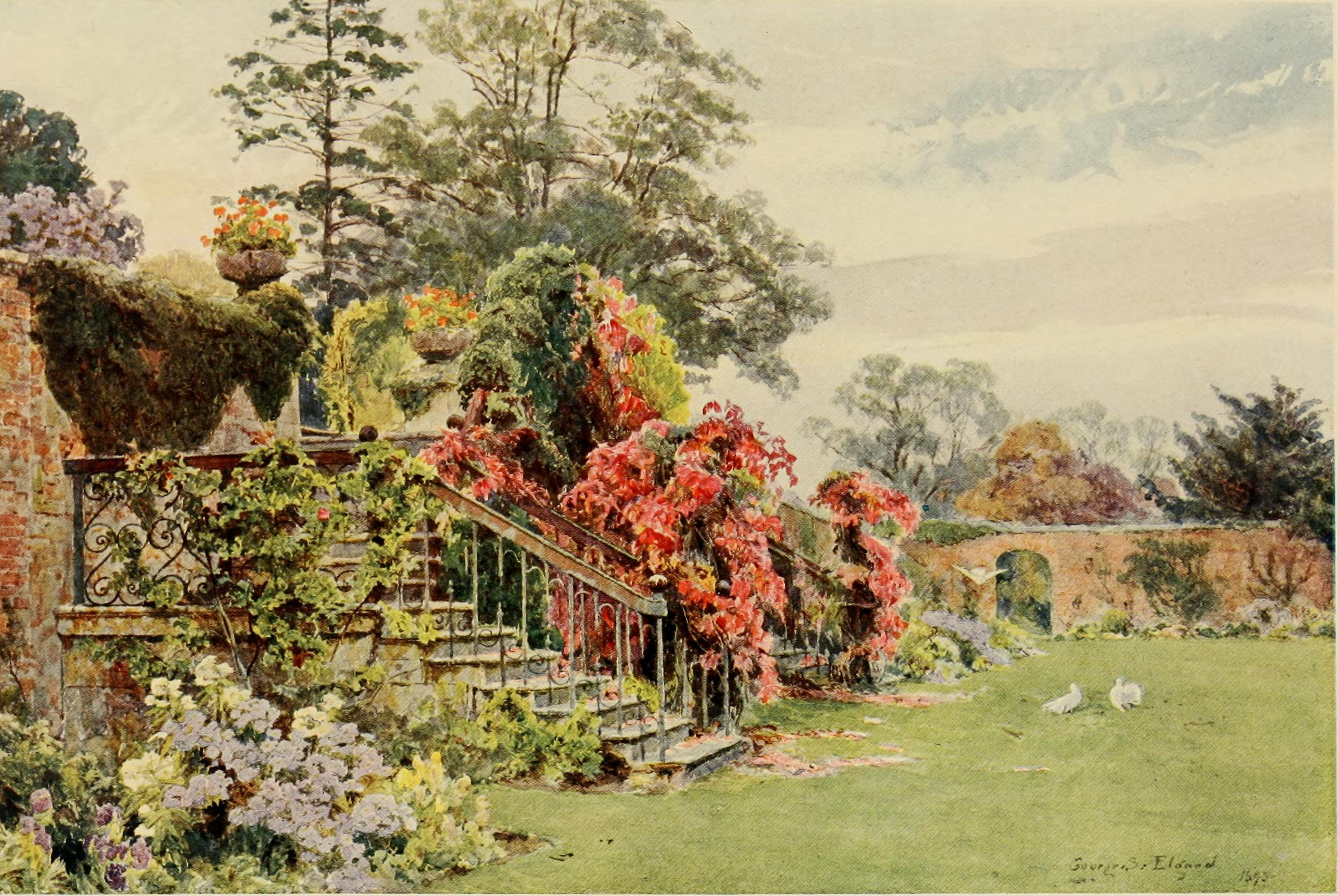
Colour plate from Some English Gardens (1904) by Gertrude Jekyll.

John Claudius Loudon was a successful Scottish landscape planner and journalist, founder of the first British gardening magazine, the populist The Gardener's Magazine in 1826. He met his wife Jane Webb after giving a favourable review of her novel The Mummy! A Tale of the Twenty-Second Century (1827). They worked together on a number of books concerning horticulture, and her own books mostly targeted the emerging "lady's" market for basic instruction, the word being included in several titles.

Andrew Jackson Downing's magazine The Horticulturist was an American analogue of Loudon's Gardener's Magazine, published from 1846. His A Treatise on the Theory and Practice of Landscape Gardening, Adapted to North America (1841) had been the most successful American gardening book to date, and influential in encouraging the creation of urban parks for the rapidly expanding American cities, including Central Park.

The Victorian era in the United Kingdom saw significant changes in gardening practices, fuelled by new technologies such as the invention of the lawn mower and imports of exotic plants from the far reaches of the Empire. Garden writing, particularly in magazines, grew in prominence along with these developments, driven in part by middle class gardeners in suburban developments keen to make good use of their land. The Gardeners' Chronicle still survives in merged form, though now more a trade journal.

Probably the most influential book of the century was The Wild Garden (1870) by William Robinson, who had trained as a gardener in Ireland. His The Garden: An Illustrated Weekly Journal of Horticulture in All Its Branches was published from 1872 to 1927, with many distinguished contributors, including Gertrude Jekyll, who also wrote many books. Their style, sometimes (too often) called the Arts and Craft garden, dominated English gardening until at least World War II. Robinson conducted a ferocious war in print with the leading supporter of some formality in garden style, the architect Reginald Blomfield, author of The Formal Garden in England ("The Italian influence has been wholly evil ... heaps of money wasted in a theatrical show", Robinson thundered), though when they finally met, "they got on rather well".

Seaton describes Henry Arthur Bright's A Year in a Lancashire Garden (1879) as a "garden autobiograph[y]", noting that it is structured like a series of diary entries as opposed to a treatise or reference work. Atkinson argues that Charles Dudley Warner's memoir My Summer in a Garden (1871) is a foundational work of garden writing in American letters.

== 20th and 21st centuries ==
Throughout the 20th century there were large numbers of books on gardening published, of all sorts, including scholarly monographs on major groups of plants. One of the most successful was the light and anecdotal Down the Garden Path (1932) by Beverley Nichols, illustrated by Rex Whistler, which has remained in print ever since, and was followed by a number of sequels.

In the UK, the Victorian boom in magazines dedicated to gardening began to slacken in the years around 1900, with Amateur Gardening, founded in 1884, the longest survival in 2022. However, the gardening column in regular newspapers and magazines became more significant. In the central decades of the 20th century, these were very important in the UK, dividing somewhat into straightforward "how to" advice, and more literary styles, often by women. The second group included Vita Sackville-West, creator of Sissinghurst, whose column in The Observer ran from 1946 to 1961. Although a prolific novelist and poet, few of her books dealt much with gardening. Others were Margery Fish, Hugh Johnson, and Robin Lane Fox.

In early 20th century America, garden writing targeted at amateur gardeners frequently appeared in the popular press during what Clayton calls the "golden age of magazines".

Jamaica Kincaid, a novelist, gardener, and garden writer, has published a number of works on gardens. Her My Garden (Book) (1999) uses gardens as a lens to explore diverse themes including colonialism while providing advice and instruction on garden management.

Atkinson identifies Richard Powers's 1998 novel Gain as an example of late 20th-century literary fiction that takes gardening as its subject.

== Works of garden writing ==
- Bright, Henry Arthur (1891) [1879]. A Year in a Lancashire Garden. London: Macmillan.
- Hill, Thomas (1563). The Profitable Arte of Gardening.
- Hill, Thomas (1608). The Gardener's Labyrinth.
- Jefferson, Thomas (1766–1824). Garden Book. Manuscript held by the Massachusetts Historical Society.
- Kincaid, Jamaica (1999). My Garden (Book). New York: Farrar, Straus and Giroux. ISBN 0-374-28186-6. OCLC 41049724.
- Lawson, William (1637) [1608]. The Country Housewife's Garden. London: Anne Griffin. hdl:2027/osu.32435004189916.
- Tusser, Thomas (1878) [1557]. Five Hundred Points of Good Husbandry. London: Trübner.
- Van Zuylen, Gabrielle (1995) [1994]. The Garden: Visions of Paradise. 'New Horizons' series. Translated by Paris, I. Mark. London: Thames & Hudson. ISBN 978-0-500-30055-8.
- Warner, Charles Dudley (1871). My Summer in a Garden. Boston: J. R. Osgood & Company. ISBN 978-1-4047-6893-2.

== See also ==
- History of gardening
- List of professional gardeners
- Pleasure garden

== Sources ==
- Atkinson, Jennifer Wren (1 August 2018). Gardenland: Nature, Fantasy, and Everyday Practice. Athens, Georgia: University of Georgia Press. doi:10.2307/j.ctt1vhtrjm. ISBN 978-0-8203-5318-0. JSTOR j.ctt1vhtrjm.
- Bending, Stephen (2013). Green Retreats: Women, Gardens and Eighteenth-Century Culture. Cambridge University Press. ISBN 978-1-1070-4002-1.
- Bilston, Sarah (2008). "Queens of the Garden: Victorian Women Gardeners and the Rise of the Gardening Advice Text". Victorian Literature and Culture. 36 (1): 1–19. doi:10.1017/S1060150308080017. ISSN 1060-1503. JSTOR 40347590.
- Clayton, Virginia Tuttle (2000). The Once and Future Gardener: Garden Writing from the Golden Age of Magazines, 1900–1940. Boston: David R. Godine. ISBN 978-1-56792-102-1.
- Dann, Christine (1992). "Sweet William and Sticky Nellie: Sex Differences in New Zealand Gardening and Garden Writing". Women's Studies International Forum. 15 (2): 233–249. doi:10.1016/0277-5395(92)90103-3.
- Fidecaro, Agnese (2012). "Jamaica Kincaid's Practical Politics of the Intimate in My Garden (Book)". In Pratt, Geraldine; Rosner, Victoria (eds.). The Global and the Intimate: Feminism in Our Time. New York: Columbia University Press. doi:10.7312/prat15448. ISBN 9780231520843. JSTOR 10.7312/prat15448.
- Hobhouse, Penelope (2004). Plants in Garden History. Pavilion Books. ISBN 1-86205-660-9.
- Penn, Helen (1993). An Englishwoman's Garden. BBC Books. ISBN 0563364300.
- Quest-Ritson, Charles (2001). The English Garden: A Social History. Penguin. ISBN 0-670-88768-4.
- Rogers, Elizabeth Barlow (2011). Writing the Garden: A Literary Conversation Across Two Centuries. Boston: David R. Godine. ISBN 978-1-56792-440-4.
- Seaton, Beverly (1982). "The Garden Writing of Henry Arthur Bright". Garden History. 10 (1): 74–79. doi:10.2307/1586853. JSTOR 1586853.
- Uglow, Jenny (2004). A Little History of British Gardening. Chatto & Windus. ISBN 0-7011-6928-1.
