= The Garden: Visions of Paradise =

1994 book by Gabrielle van Zuylen

- 2013 edition. The cover featuring details from La Nouvelle Maison rustique, Paris, 1735.
- Author: Gabrielle van Zuylen
- Original title: Tous les jardins du monde
- Translator: I. Mark Paris
- Cover artist: Anonymous
- Language: French
- Series: Découvertes Gallimard●Art de vivre (FR); New Horizons (UK); Abrams Discoveries (US)
- Release number: 207th in collection
- Subject: History of gardening
- Genre: Nonfiction monograph
- Publisher: Éditions Gallimard (FR); Thames & Hudson (UK); Harry N. Abrams (US)
- Publication date: 22 April 1994; 6 February 2013 (new ed.)
- Publication place: France
- English publication date: 1995
- Media type: Print (paperback)
- Pages: 176 pp
- ISBN: 978-2-0705-3241-4 (first edition)
- OCLC: 858201757
- Preceded by: Femmes et religions : Déesses ou servantes de Dieu ?
- Followed by: Sous la Manche, le tunnel

The Garden: Visions of Paradise (US title: Paradise on Earth: The Gardens of Western Europe; French: Tous les jardins du monde, lit. 'All the Gardens of the World') is a 1994 illustrated monograph on gardens and cultural history of gardening. Written by the Franco-Dutch garden designer and landscape architect Gabrielle van Zuylen, and published in pocket format by Éditions Gallimard as the 207th volume in their 'Découvertes' collection (known as 'New Horizons' in the United Kingdom, and 'Abrams Discoveries' in the United States).

== Introduction ==
US edition (left): Claude Monet's garden at Giverny, France. UK edition: The Pantheon, Stourhead.

The book is part of the Culture et société series (formerly belonging to Art de vivre series) in the 'Découvertes Gallimard' collection. According to the tradition of 'Découvertes', which is based on an abundant pictorial documentation and a way of bringing together visual documents and texts, enhanced by printing on coated paper, as commented in L'Express, 'genuine monographs, published like art books'. It's almost like a 'graphic novel', replete with colour plates.

The book has been reprinted several times, and translated into English (UK & US), Italian, Japanese, Russian, South Korean, Turkish, traditional (Taiwan) and simplified Chinese (China). A new edition came out in 2013, featuring the same cover motif with a colour adjustment.

In a sense of searching for the lost paradise, Van Zuylen traces in the book the history of gardens from Genesis. The history of gardens is as old as that of the world since it is God, they say, who had the idea of creating the first 'green space' on this still arid land where there were neither bushes nor grass, and placed there the man whom he had formed. After the loss of paradise, man has not stopped trying to recreate it artificially ever since. Philosophical, religious, humanist, even licentious, the garden has also had, in its history, a political purpose. On the other hand, the author explains, the garden is for aesthetic delight, purely artistic, in corresponding with the state of creating a painting. A place solely for art and pleasure.

== Synopsis ==
This elegantly and beautifully illustrated pocket book deals with the history of Western gardens in a professional way, from antiquity (chap. I, 'The Gardens of Antiquity and the Legacy of Islam': Mesopotamian, Persian, Greek and Roman gardens), medieval Europe (chap. II, 'The Medieval Garden'), Renaissance Italy (chap. III, 'The Gardens of Renaissance Italy'), Classical France (chap. IV, 'Formality Triumphant: The Classic French Garden'), 18th-century England (chap. V, 'Planting Pictures: The English Landscape Garden') up to the modern day (chap. VI, 'From Eclecticism to Modernism': for instance, the Parc André Citroën). The book provides numerous historical documents in its second part—the 'Documents' section—which contains a compilation of excerpts divided into seven parts: 1, The origins of European gardens; 2, Gardens of the Middle Ages; 3, The Renaissance; 4, The royal gardens of France; 5, Art or nature?; 6, The diversity of 20th-century gardening; 7, Gardens of the New World. It closes with a glossary, list of the great European gardens, excerpts from the Florence Charter, further reading, list of illustrations and index.

Van Zuylen explains in the book the origin and meaning of a number of historical terms:

- Persian parádeisos: via Alexander the Great the Greeks became familiar with the phenomenon of ornamental garden—the Persian parádeisos—characterised by a watercourse in cross form, the Charbagh.
- Epicureanism: 'happiness lies in moderation and refinement', refers to an eponymous philosopher and gardener in Classical and Hellenistic Athens.
- Genius loci: originally the place dedicated to a local god (a protective spirit), later the specific attributes or special significance of a piece of landscape.
- Hortus: with the Romans, originally a place for cultivation of vegetables or fruits, later that is combined with water, trellis work and murals. Currently it means 'garden' as in horticulture.

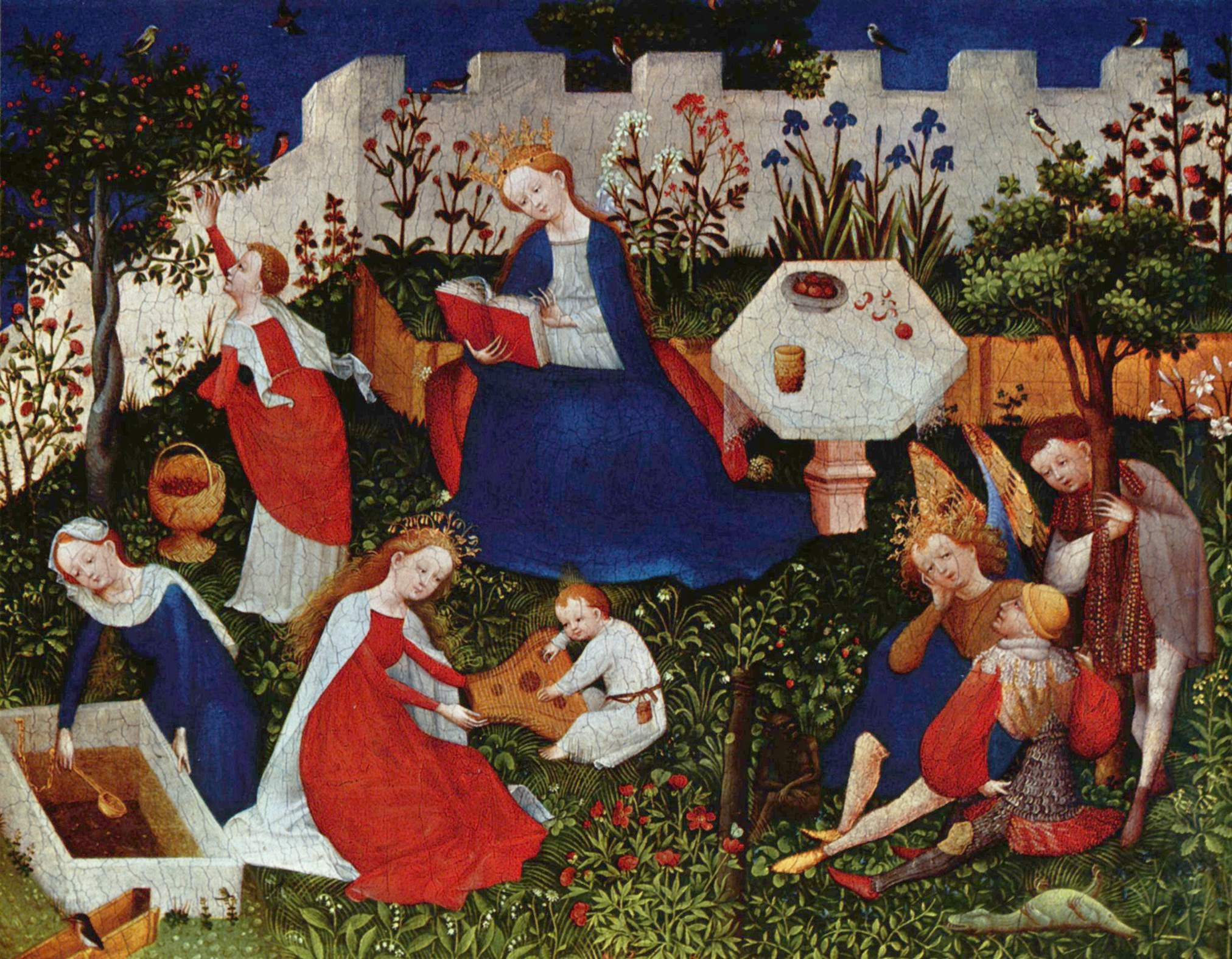
'The "Mary Garden" (Paradiesgärtlein) by an unknown Rhenish master in the early 15th century is at once an exemplary hortus conclusus and a telling record of late medieval gardening practices.' – The Garden: Visions of Paradise. Excerpted from the caption for the painting found on pp. 40–41 as a double-page spread illustration.

It is natural using French sources in an English garden book, especially with regard to the medieval gardens, such as the frescoes from the Palais des Papes in Avignon and illustrations from the Bibliothèque nationale de France. But the author didn't forget to include some German sources, with Paradiesgärtlein being one of them.

It goes without saying that the glory of classical French garden culture and the dynasties of famous garden designers are discussed: Claude and Jacques Mollet (inventor of the parterres de broderie), André Le Nôtre (known for the gardens of Vaux-le-Vicomte, Versailles and the Jardin du Luxembourg).

A less well known figure, Peter Joseph Lenné, a 19th-century Prussian gardener and landscape architect who worked in Potsdam and Berlin (Klein Glienicke, Pfaueninsel and Tiergarten).

Following the Viennese Prater as the first public park, Napoleon III commissioned around 1850 the prefect of the Seine department, baron Georges-Eugène Haussmann to direct the renovation of Paris. Haussmann worked with the engineer Adolphe Alphand and the gardener Jean-Pierre Barillet-Deschamps, they changed the closed hunting forest Bois de Boulogne into a recreation park for the Parisian public. At the same time, Frederick Law Olmsted designed the Central Park in New York City.

Then in the modern times, the beloved gardens of Gertrude Jekyll (Munstead Wood), Vita Sackville-West (Sissinghurst Castle Garden) and Major Lawrence Johnston (Hidcote Manor Garden). The current canon of the good garden: a formal structure in combination with an informal planting, especially the perennials.

Van Zuylen closes her book with a reflection:

Garden-making, like other art forms, draws on the past as it looks to the future. Tradition and innovation are the warp and weft of its history. A garden design is a visual statement of the relationship among human beings, their natural environment and prevailing cultural values [...] Gardeners around the world share a common goal: to create a retreat, however limited in space or charm, that offers sanctuary from the tensions of modern life, a place where people can once again relate to nature and feel the pulse of our living, growing planet.

== Interview ==
An interview between Van Zuylen and Éditions Gallimard took place on the occasion of the publication of Tous les jardins du monde, the author described that pleasure is the primary purpose of a garden, the gardens have always been called 'pleasure gardens'. There are also three main functions of the garden: the sacred – 'sacred enclosure', the place blessed by gods; the power – the great gardens of Cyrus in Persia were wonderful paradises, but also masterful demonstrations of power; the domestic – the small, useful and popular city gardens.

The Romans were the first to have the aesthetic concern of nature, for them, the garden was the counterpart of architecture. In the Middle Ages, the garden also played a very important role, but in another sense: it was walled, protected from the outside. It was the secret garden, the garden of delights, allegory and theatre of love. The large classical gardens of the monarchy at Vaux-le-Vicomte and Versailles, the gardens à la française. In the eighteenth-century England, on the contrary, with the landscape gardens developed by the large landowners which are far from the court. The garden is truly a mirror, the counterpart of the social, political and artistic history of a civilisation.

== Reception ==
On Babelio, the book has an average of 3.68/5 based on 17 ratings. Goodreads reported, based on 8 ratings, the UK edition gets an average of 4.25 out of 5, and the US edition 3.33/5 based on 3 ratings, indicating 'generally positive opinions'.

In the French magazine L'ŒIL, an anonymous author thinks the book is 'fascinating'.
