= The Mummy! A Tale of the Twenty-Second Century =

1827 Jane C. Loudon novel

The Mummy!
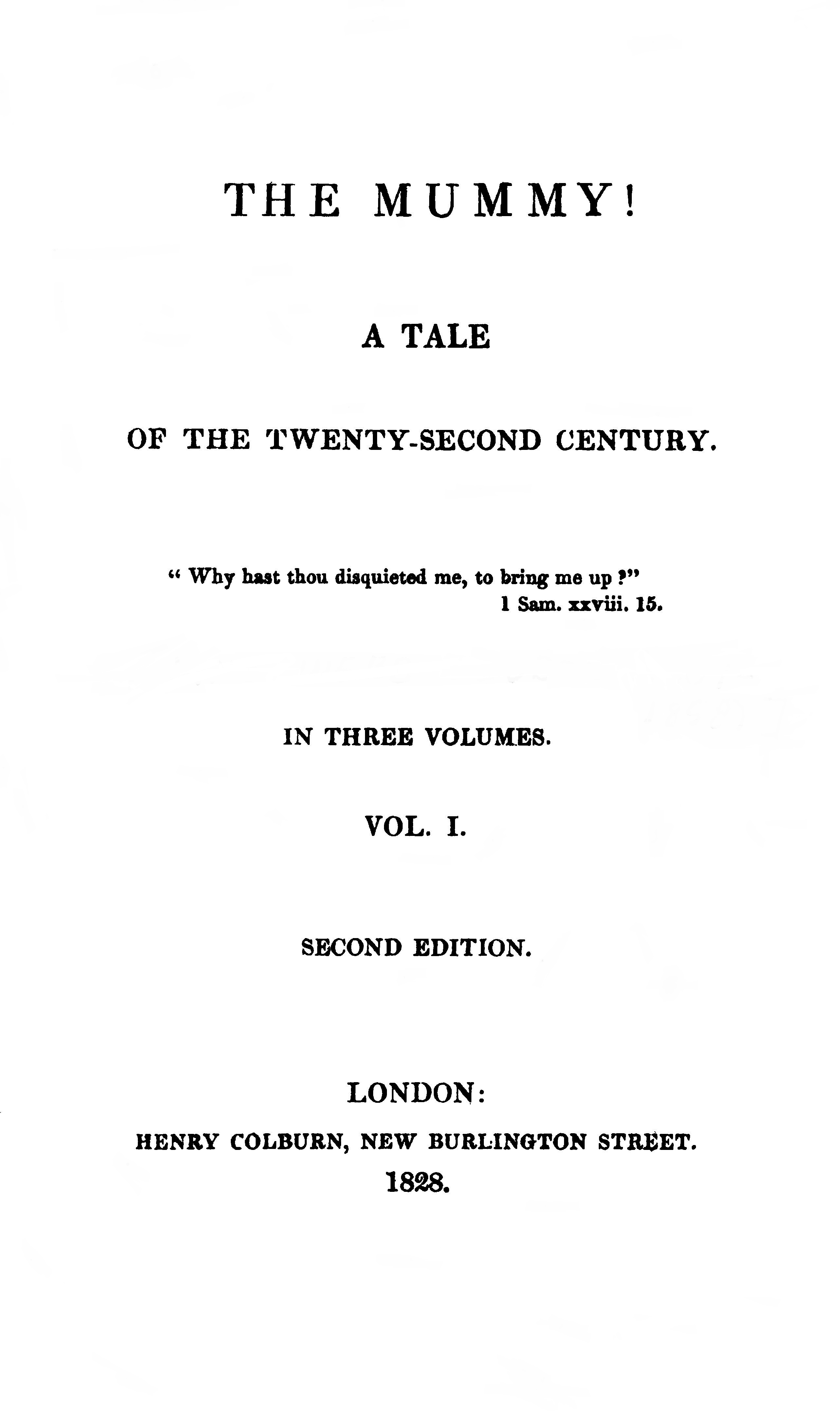
- Title page of the 1828 second edition
- Author: Anon (actually Jane Webb)
- Original title: The Mummy! A Tale of the Twenty-Second Century
- Language: English
- Genre: Science fiction
- Publication date: 1827
- Publication place: United Kingdom

The Mummy! A Tale of the Twenty-Second Century is an 1827 three-volume novel written by Jane Webb (later Jane C. Loudon). It concerns the Egyptian mummy of Cheops, who is brought back to life in the year 2126. The novel describes a future filled with advanced technology, and was the first English-language story to feature a reanimated mummy.

After her father's death, making her an orphan at the age of 17, Webb found that:

on the winding up of his affairs that it would be necessary to do something for my support. I had written a strange, wild novel, called the Mummy, in which I had laid the scene in the twenty-second century, and attempted to predict the state of improvement to which this country might possibly arrive.

She may have drawn inspiration from the general fashion for anything pharaonic, inspired by the French researches during the Napoleonic invasion of Egypt; the 1821 public unwrappings of Egyptian mummies in a theatre near Piccadilly, which she may have attended as a young woman; and, very likely, the 1818 novel by Mary Shelley, Frankenstein; or, The Modern Prometheus. As Shelley had written of Frankenstein's creation, "A mummy again endued with animation could not be so hideous as that wretch," which may have triggered her later concept. In any case, at many points she deals in greater clarity with elements from the earlier book such as the loathing for the much-desired object and the immediate arrest for crime and attempt to lie one's way out of it. However, unlike the Frankenstein monster, the hideous revived Cheops is not shuffling around dealing out horror and death, but giving canny advice on politics and life to those who befriend him. In some ways The Mummy! may be seen as her reaction to themes in Frankenstein: her mummy specifically says he is allowed life only by divine favour, rather than being indisputably vivified only by mortal science, and so on, as Hopkins' 2003 essay covers in detail.

Unlike many early science fiction works (Shelley's The Last Man, and The Reign of King George VI, 1900–1925, written anonymously in 1763), Loudon did not portray the future as her own day with only political changes. She filled her world with foreseeable changes in technology, society, and even fashion. The hero, Edric Montague, lived in a peaceful and Catholic England under the rule of Queen Claudia. Her court ladies wear trousers and hair ornaments of controlled flame. Surgeons and lawyers may be steam-powered automatons. Air travel, by balloon, is commonplace. A kind of Internet is predicted in it. Besides trying to account for the revivification of the mummy in scientific terms—galvanic shock rather than incantations—"she embodied ideas of scientific progress and discovery, that now read like prophecies" to those later in the 19th century. Many of the incidents in the book can be seen as satirical or humorous. Her social attitudes have resulted in this book being ranked among feminist novels.

The Mummy!: Or a Tale of the Twenty-Second Century was published anonymously in 1827 by Henry Colburn in three volumes, as was usual in that day so that each small volume could be easily carried around. It drew many favourable reviews, including one in 1829 in The Gardener's Magazine on the inventions proposed in it. In 1830, the 46-year-old reviewer, John Claudius Loudon, sought out the 22-year-old Webb, and they married the next year.
