= Gabrielle van Zuylen =

Franco-Dutch garden writer

- Born: Gabriëlle Andrée Iglesias Velayos y Taliaferro; 9 July 1933; Perpignan, France
- Died: 3 July 2010 (aged 76); Paris, France
- Education: Radcliffe College
- Occupations: Garden designer, garden writer
- Notable work: Jardins privés en France; Les jardins de Russell Page; Tous les jardins du monde
- Spouse: Thierry van Zuylen
- Children: 4
- Awards: Prix de l'Académie française

Baroness Gabriëlle Andrée van Zuylen van Nyevelt van de Haar (née Iglesias Velayos y Taliaferro; 9 July 1933 – 3 July 2010) was a French landscape architect, garden designer, garden writer and a member of the International Best Dressed Hall of Fame List since 1978. "Baroness Gabrielle van Zuylen personifies the charm and elegance", according to the French magazine L'ŒIL.

== Biography ==
Gabrielle van Zuylen was born in southern France, daughter of Andrés Iglesias y Velayos, the Spanish consul in Perpignan, and his wife Mildred Taliaferro. She grew up in the United States and studied at Radcliffe College. She bears the title baroness van Zuylen as wife of the Dutch baron Thierry van Zuylen van Nyevelt van de Haar since they got married in 1956 in Boston. Although they divorced in 1987, Gabrielle retained the name Van Zuylen.

The Van Zuylen couple bought the property Haras de Varaville in Normandy in 1964. The property consisted of a 17th-century stable and ruins of castles that burned down in 1937. They asked the American architect Peter Harden to build a new home in a modern style. The garden was created and designed by the British landscape architect Russell Page. Gabrielle van Zuylen later wrote the book The Gardens of Russell Page, which is about his influence in landscape architecture. The Garden Writers Association of America named this work 'best book on gardens'.

She became a specialist on the construction of gardens and published several works about the subject, especially about historic gardens. Her books appeared mostly in French and English and some were also published or translated in other languages. She was a member of the International Dendrology Society, Les Amateurs de Jardins and was a Chevalier of the Order of Agricultural Merit. She was also a gardener.

== Interview ==
An interview between Van Zuylen and Éditions Gallimard took place on the occasion of the publication of Tous les jardins du monde (UK ed. – The Garden: Visions of Paradise), a heavily illustrated pocket book belonging to the collection "Découvertes Gallimard", which gives a concise history of the gardens, from antiquity to the modern day.

Van Zuylen described that pleasure is the primary purpose of a garden, the gardens have always been called "pleasure gardens". There are also three main functions of the garden: the sacred – "sacred enclosure", the place blessed by gods; the power – the great gardens of Cyrus in Persia were wonderful paradises, but also masterful demonstrations of power; the domestic – the small, useful and popular city gardens.

The Romans were the first to have the aesthetic concern of nature, for them, the garden was the counterpart of architecture. In the Middle Ages, the garden also played a very important role, but in another sense: it was walled, protected from the outside. It was the secret garden, the garden of delights, allegory and theatre of love. The large classical gardens of the monarchy at Vaux-le-Vicomte and Versailles, the gardens à la française. In the eighteenth-century England, on the contrary, with the landscape gardens developed by the large landowners which are far from the court. The garden is truly a mirror, the counterpart of the social, political and artistic history of a civilisation.

== Publications ==
- Jardins privés en France (collab. with Anita Pereire, Prix Lange), 1983
- The Gardens of Russell Page (collab. with Marina Schinz), 1991
- Tous les jardins du monde, collection « Découvertes Gallimard » (nº 207), série Culture et société. Éditions Gallimard, 1994, new edition in 2013
  - The Garden: Visions of Paradise, 'New Horizons' series, Thames & Hudson, 1995, reprinted in 2000 (UK edition)
  - Paradise on Earth: The Gardens of Western Europe, "Abrams Discoveries" series, Harry N. Abrams, 1995 (U.S. edition)
- Alhambra: A Moorish Paradise, Thames & Hudson, 1999
- Apremont : A French Folly (with Gilles de Brissac), 2004
- Monet's Garden In Giverny, 2009
- Stourhead: English Arcadia
