= Porchester Terrace =

Street in Central London

Coordinates: 51.51275°N 0.18443°W

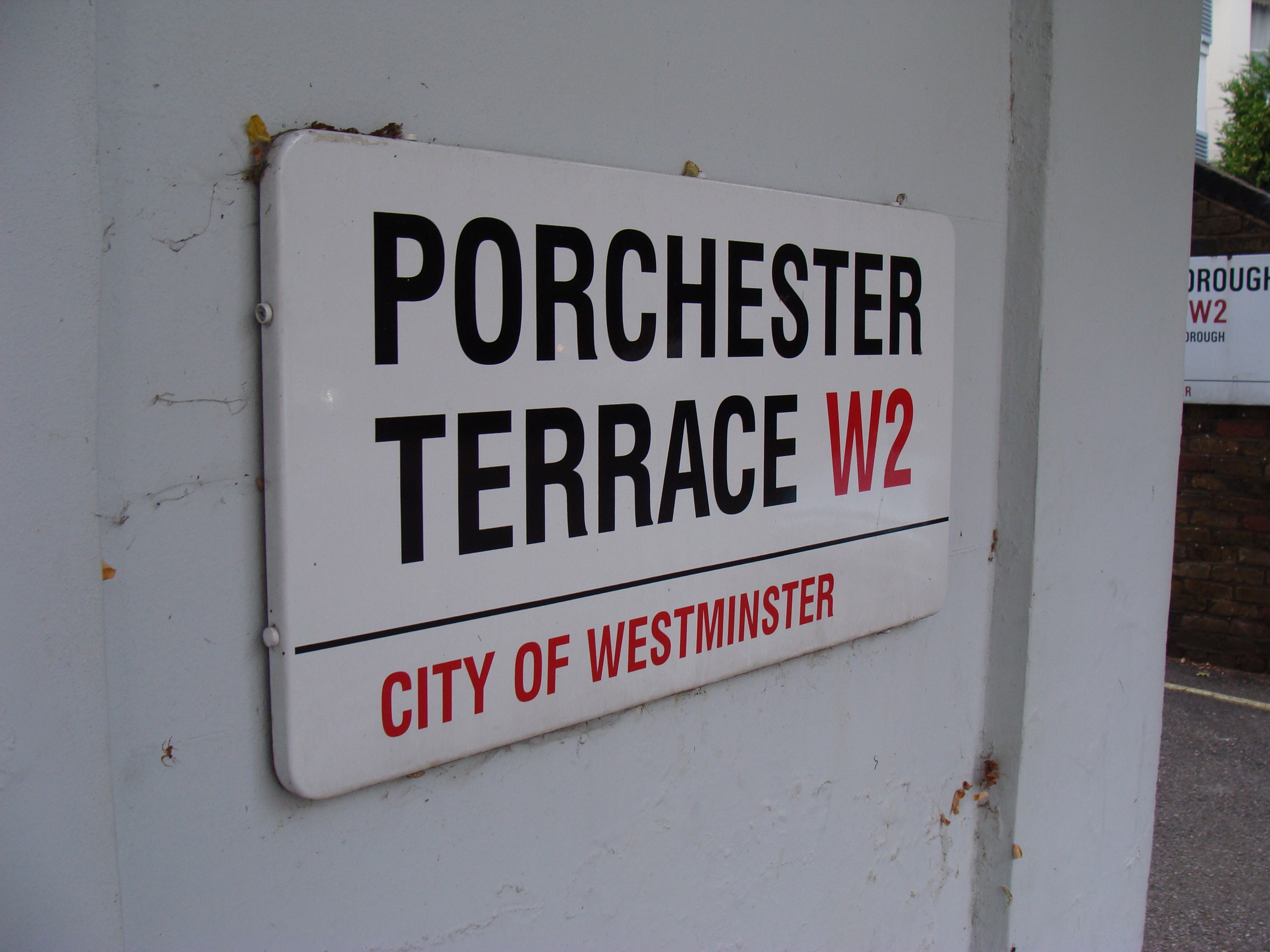
Street sign.

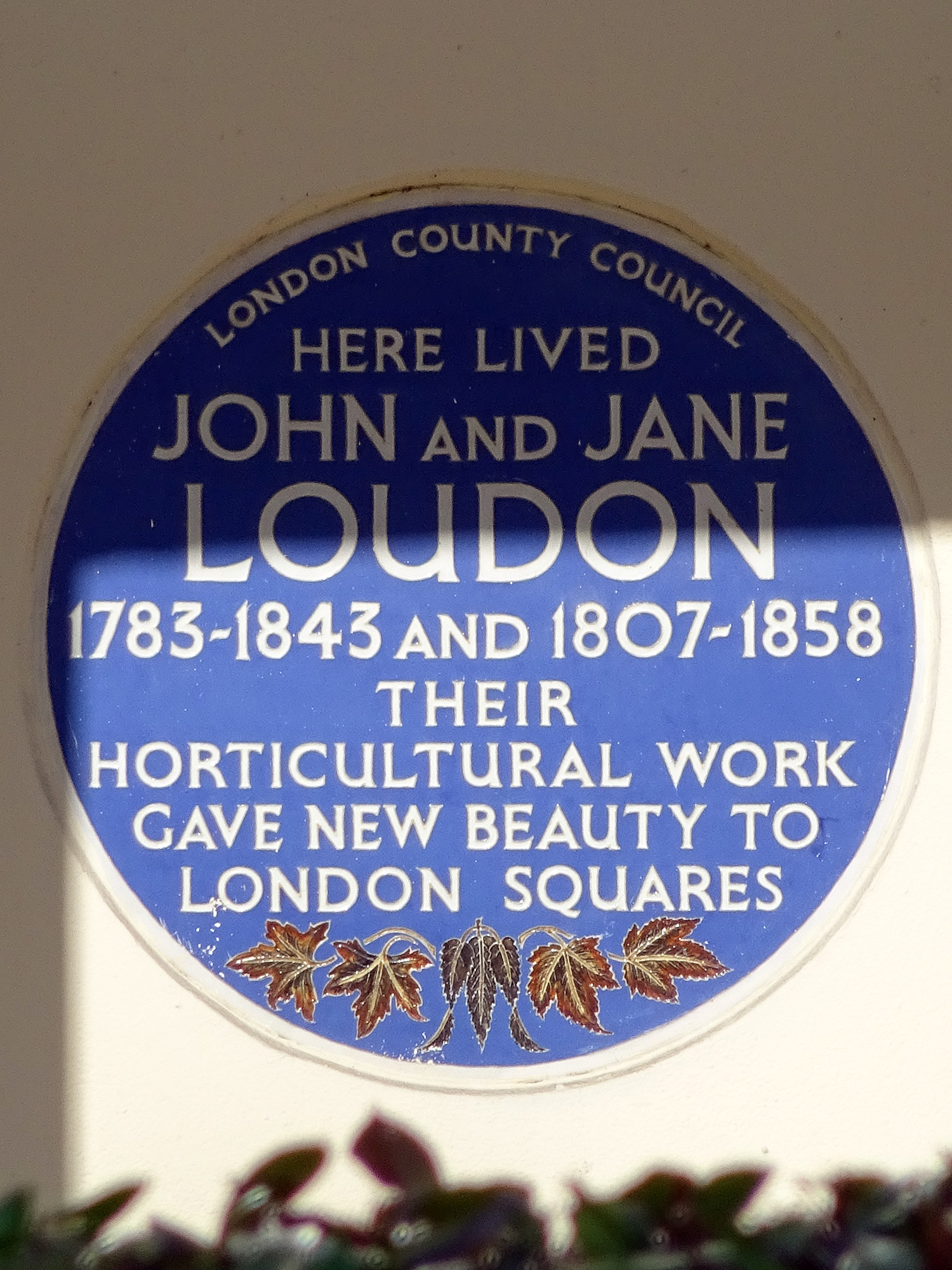
Blue plaque for writer Jane Loudon and her botanist husband John Claudius Loudon.

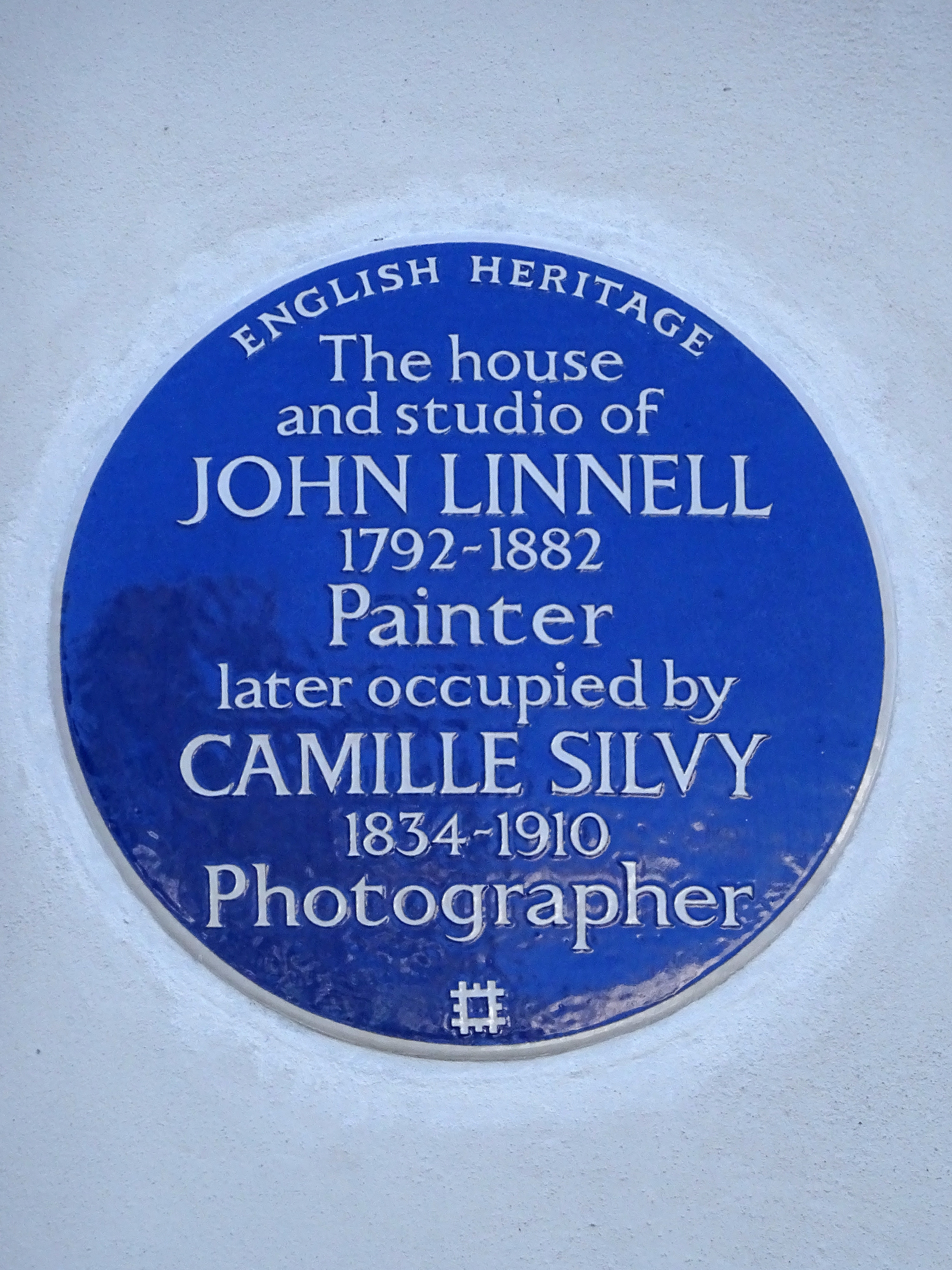
Blue plaque for the artist John Linnell and the later photographer Camille Silvy.

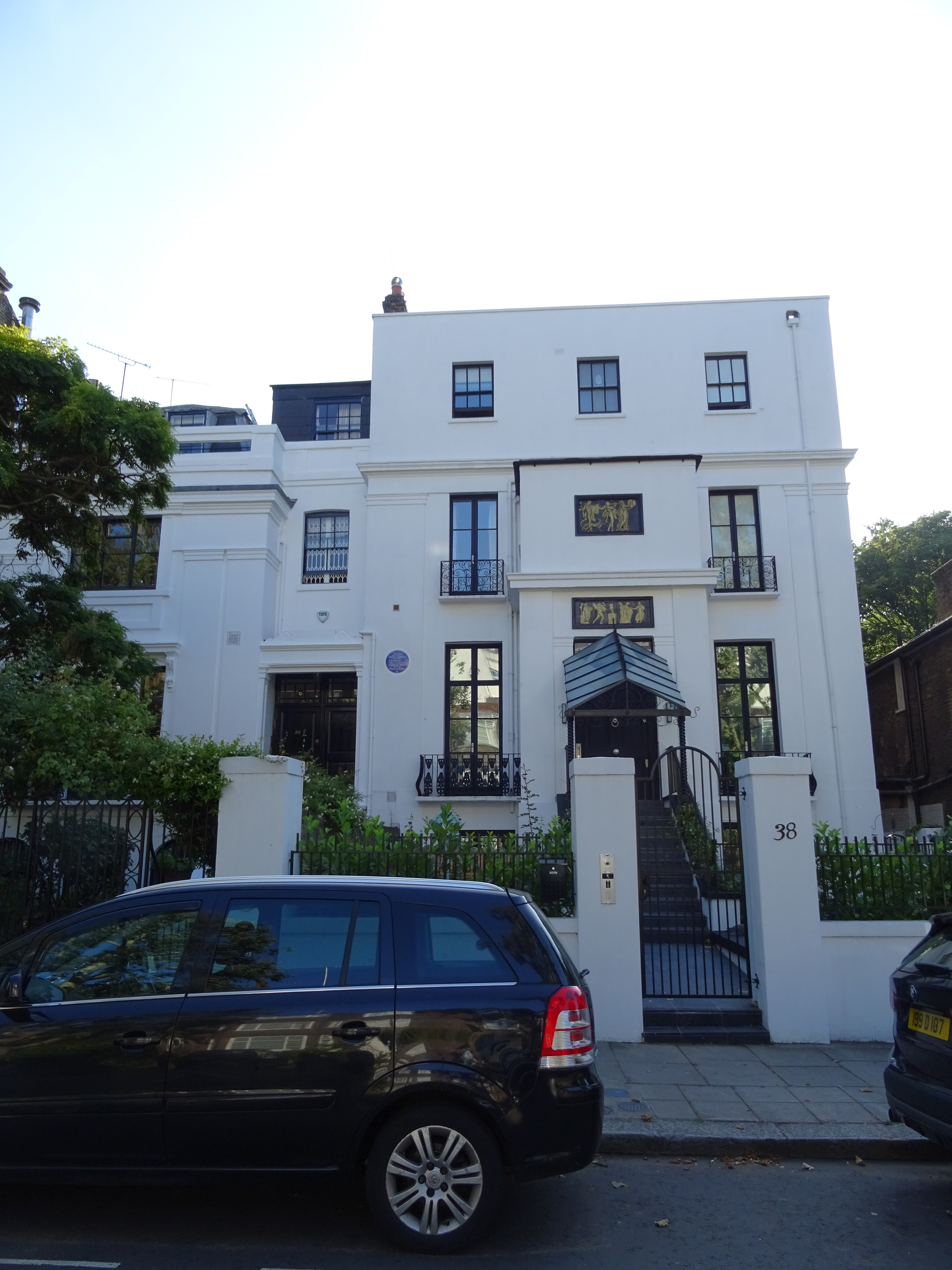
38 Porchester Terrace. A Grade II listed building.

Porchester Terrace is a street in the Bayswater area of London. Located in the City of Westminster, it runs between Porchester Gardens in the north and the Bayswater Road to the south close to Kensington Gardens. Adjacent streets Leinster Gardens and Queensborough Terrace run directly parallel to it, as does Queensway a little to the west. At the northern end is the Hallfield Estate.

It is a residential street, built originally in the 1820s during the Regency era, although it was expanded during the Victorian era with many of the houses still in the stucco-fronted design common to the area. Newer houses are also scattered along the street. Notable historic residents include the painter John Linnell the photographer Camille Silvy, the writer Jane Loudon and her botanist husband John Claudius Loudon. The novelist Wilkie Collins also lived in the street with his father the artist William Collins.

== Bibliography ==
- Cherry, Bridget & Pevsner, Nikolaus. London 3: North West. Yale University Press, 2002.
- Clarke, William M. The Secret Life of Wilkie Collins Ivan R. Dee, 1 Oct 2004.
- Hannavy, John (ed.) Encyclopedia of Nineteenth-Century Photography. Routledge, 2013
