= Porchester Gardens =

Street in Central London

Coordinates: 51.51379°N 0.18737°W

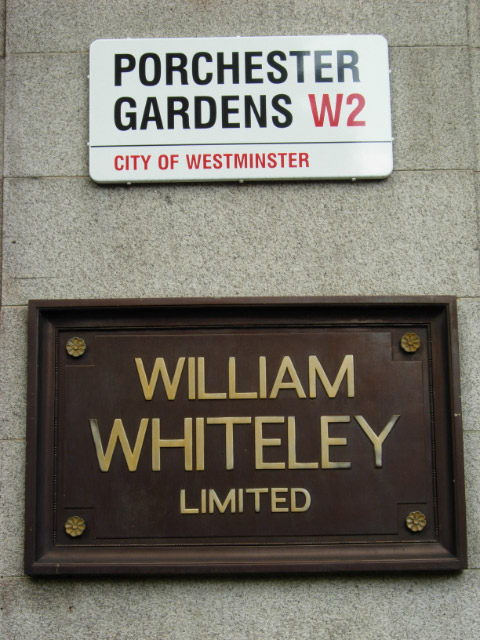
A street sign and a plaque for Whiteleys.

Porchester Gardens is a street in the Bayswater area of London. Located in the City of Westminster, it runs east to west and crosses Queensway. Like several streets in the area it was developed by Edward Orme. In 1879 the engineer R. E. B. Crompton lit his house by electricity, effectively the first in London to do so. The department store Whiteleys was located where the two streets joined before its closure. The road features a mixture of residential and commercial properties. At the eastern end, Porchester Terrace runs southwards to Kensington Gardens while in the west it ultimately merges into Kensington Gardens Square and Leinster Square. Moscow Road runs parallel to the south for much of the route.

== See also ==
- Porchester Square, located nearby

== Bibliography ==
- Brock, William H. William Crookes (1832–1919) and the Commercialization of Science. Routledge, 2016.
- Cockburn, J. S., King, H. P. F. & McDonnell, K. G. T. A History of the County of Middlesex. Institute of Historical Research, 1989.
- Weightman, Gavin. Children of Light: How Electricity Changed Britain Forever. Atlantic Books Ltd, 2011.
- Rennison, Nick. The London Blue Plaque Guide: Fourth Edition: Fourth Edition. The History Press, 2009.
- Weinreb, Ben, Hibbert, Christopher Keay, John & Keay, Julia. The London Encyclopaedia. Pan Macmillan, 2010.
