= The Profitable Arte of Gardening =

1563 gardening book by Thomas Hill

The Profitable Arte of Gardening was the first book about gardening published in England, being first published in 1563 under the title A Most Briefe and Pleasaunte Treatise, Teaching How to Dresse, Sowe, and Set a Garden. It was written by Thomas Hill, who went on to write the even more successful work, The Gardener's Labyrinth.

== Contents ==
The work was a collection of old material from a variety of sources, translated into Engsh. Mile Hadfield described it as the work of a journalist rather than a practical gardener.

To protect against hail, the book advised hanging the skin of a crocodile, hyena or seal.
