= Nativity of the Virgin/Doubt of Saint Joseph =

Paintings by the Upper Rhenish Master

Nativity of the Virgin Doubt of Saint Joseph
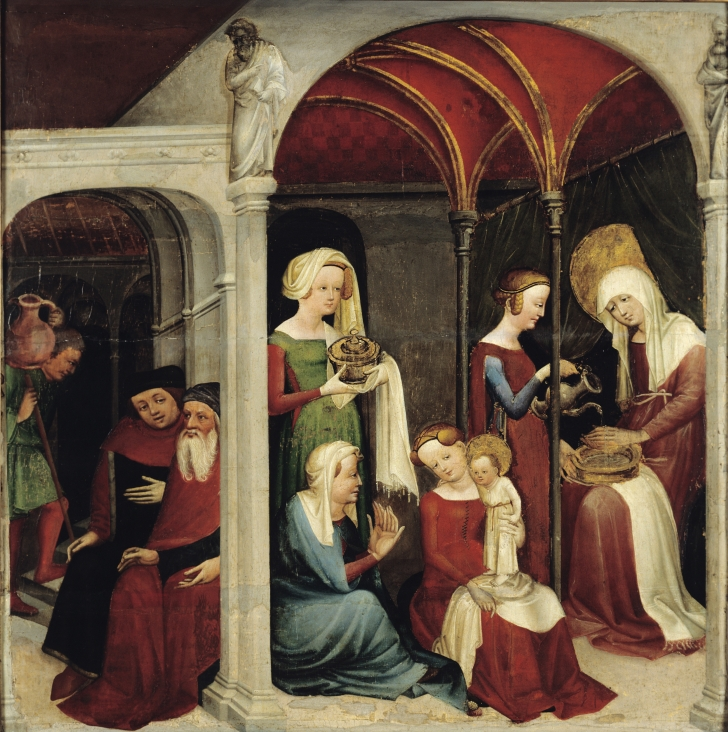
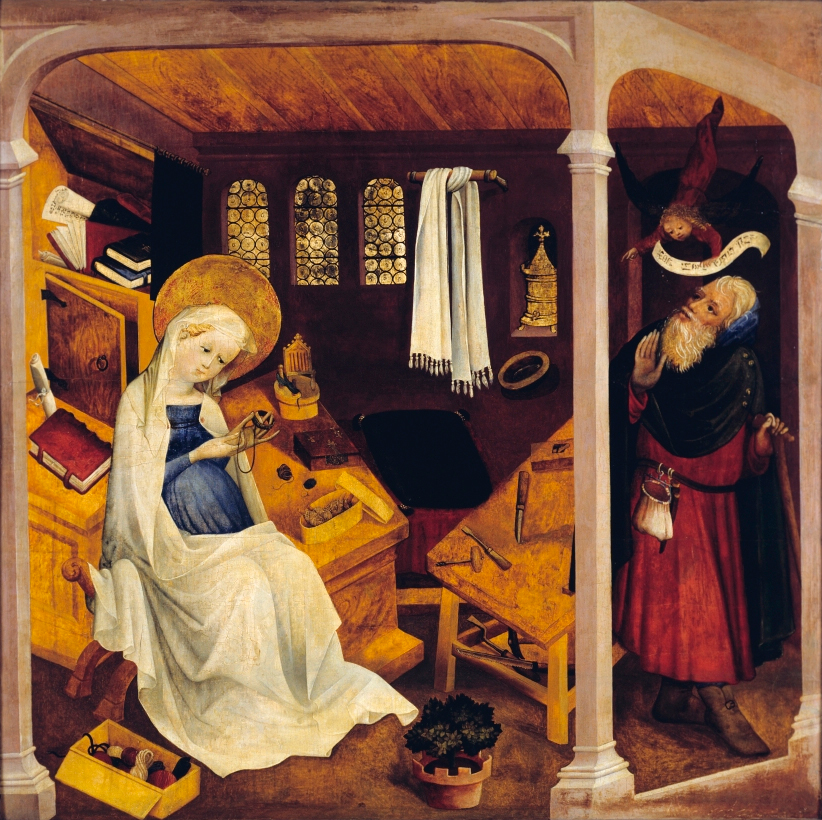
- Nativity of the Virgin Doubt of Saint Joseph
- Artist: Upper Rhenish Master
- Year: c. 1430
- Medium: oil painting on panel (fir)
- Movement: Christian art Gothic art
- Subject: Nativity of Mary; Saint Joseph; Virgin birth of Jesus
- Dimensions: 113.9 cm × 114.5 cm (44.8 in × 45.1 in)
- Location: Musée de l'Œuvre Notre-Dame, Strasbourg
- Owner: Hôpital civil, Strasbourg
- Accession: 1936

The Nativity of the Virgin and The Doubt of Saint Joseph are two Catholic panel paintings by the Notname Strasbourg-based artist called "Upper Rhenish Master". Both paintings are almost square and belong to the City hospital of Strasbourg, founded in the early 12th century. They are on display in the Musée de l'Œuvre Notre-Dame since 1936. Their inventory number is MBA 1481 and MBA 1482 ("MBA" stands for Musée des Beaux-Arts).

The paintings have generally been dated to circa 1410–1420, but more recently, rather to circa 1430. They belonged to a larger, now dismembered set of paintings, probably an altarpiece, from the disappeared convent of Saint Mark, which was a part of the City hospital.

The Nativity of the Virgin takes place in the larger, right part of the painting, with Saint Anne washing her hands, while the left part of the painting depicts Joachim being delivered the news. The Doubt of Saint Joseph depicts the moment when, after having discovered that his young wife is pregnant, a very old Saint Joseph is told by an angel not to worry about her faithfulness. While the solemn Nativity of the Virgin is inspired by Trecento models, especially a panel by Andrea di Bartolo after a now lost, circa 1335 fresco by the Sienese artists Pietro and Ambrogio Lorenzetti, the realistic Doubt of Saint Joseph, with its depiction of everyday objects full of Christian symbolism, seems to channel Flemish artists.

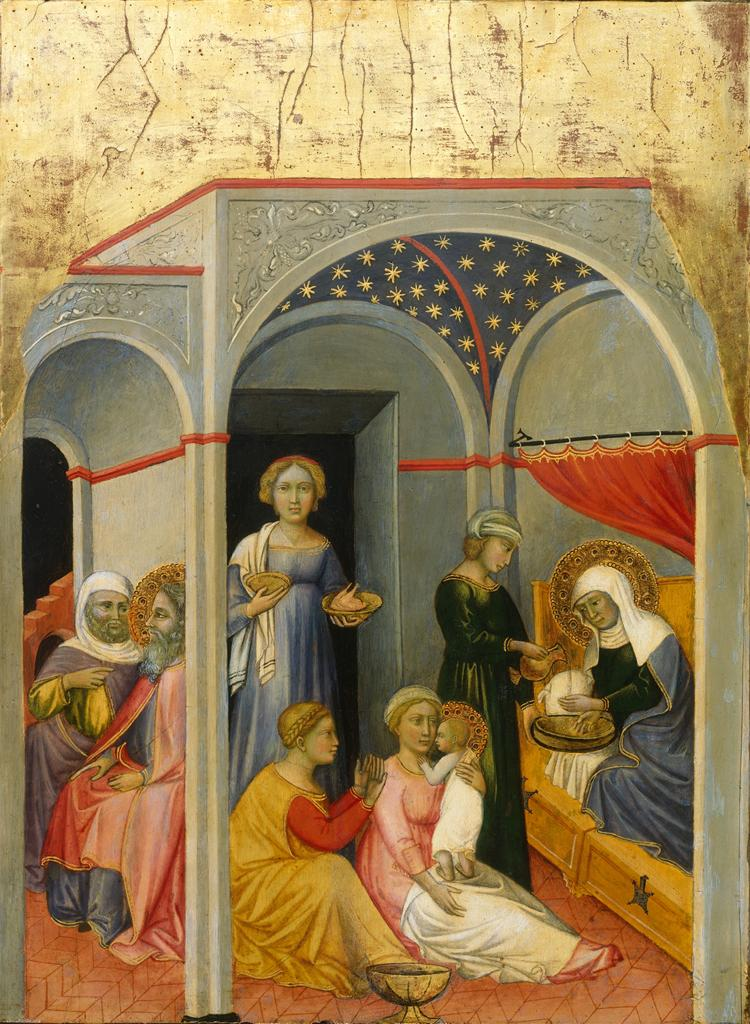
Andrea di Bartolo, Nativity of the Virgin (National Gallery of Art)
