= Jane Loudon =

English science fiction writer and botanist

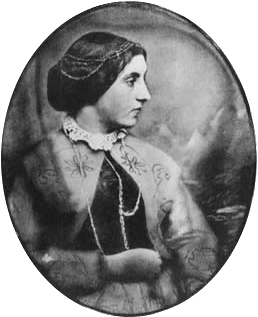
- Born: Jane Webb; 19 August 1800; Birmingham, United Kingdom
- Died: 13 July 1858 (aged 57); London, England
- Occupation: Author
- Spouse: John Claudius Loudon
- Writing career
- Genres: gardening; science fiction
- Notable works: The Mummy!; Gardening for Ladies
- Movements: Early science fiction; feminist fiction; amateur gardening

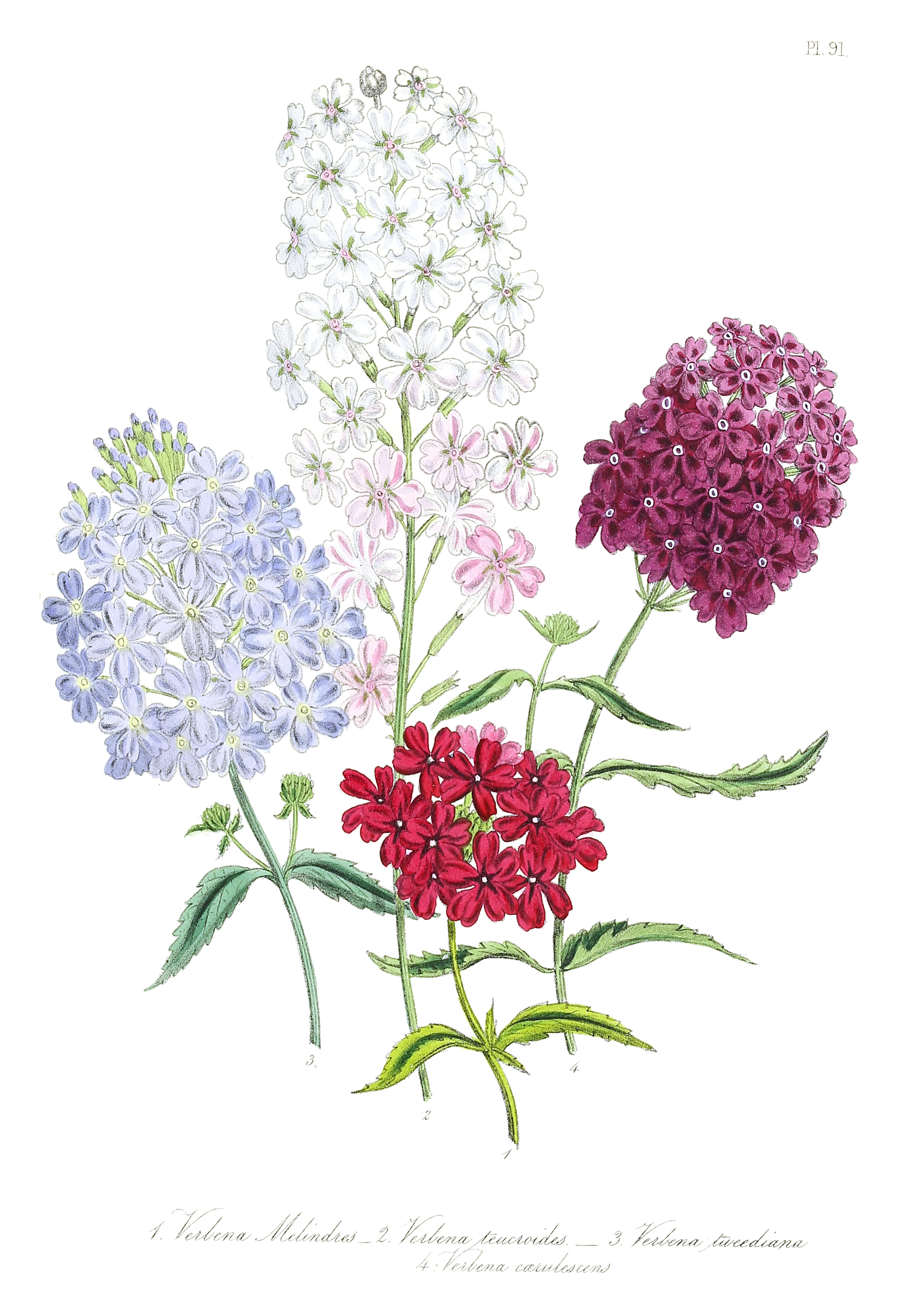
Plate from The Ladies' Flower-Garden of Ornamental Perennials (1843)

Jane Loudon (née Webb; 19 August 1800 – 13 July 1858), also known as Jane C. Loudon, or Mrs. Loudon in her publications, was an English writer and early pioneer of science fiction. She wrote before the term was coined, and was discussed for a century as a writer of Gothic fiction, fantasy or horror. She also created the first popular gardening manuals, as opposed to specialist horticultural works, reframing the art of gardening as fit for young women. She was married to the well-known horticulturalist John Claudius Loudon, and they wrote some books together, as well as her own very successful series. Loudon is famous for her gothic novel The Mummy! A Tale of the Twenty-Second Century (1827).

== Early life ==
Jane Webb's year of birth is unclear. Most sources give it as 1807, but the Church of England Deaths and Burials, 1813-2003 gives her age at death as 57, which supports her birth date as 1800. She was born to Thomas Webb, an eminent lawyer from Edgbaston, Birmingham and his wife. (Sources vary on her place of birth: according to the Oxford Dictionary of National Biography (ODNB), she was born at Ritwell House, which is possibly the same as Kitwell House at Bartley Green). After the death of her mother in 1819, she travelled in Europe for a year with her father, learning several languages. On their return, his business faltered and his fortune was lost to excessive speculation. He sold the house in Edgbaston and moved to another of his properties, Kitwell House at Bartley Green, six miles away. He died penniless in 1824, when Jane Webb was seventeen.

She would come to have three major, and contrasting, intellectual achievements. She explored cultures and gained familiarity in several languages, which would benefit her later on in her travels. At age 27 she would publish the first fictional book about mummies, which introduced a new genre to fiction. Finally, after her marriage to horticulturist and landscape designer, John Loudon, she changed to botanical writing. Jane became responsible for introducing gardening to middle-class society through her easy to understand gardening manuals. She was a pioneer as a woman to make botanical information accessible to those outside the field, and to further her ideas and her output in society, she became a self-taught botanical artist.

== Works of fiction: The Mummy! A Tale of the Twenty-Second Century ==
After the death of her father, Loudon began to support herself by writing. Her first publication was a book of poetry, Prose and Verse, that was published in 1824. After this, she changed to fiction with her best known work, The Mummy! A Tale of the Twenty-Second Century. It was written anonymously and published by Henry Colburn as a three-volume novel, as was usual in that day, so that each small volume could be carried around easily. Loudon states, "I had written a strange, wild novel, called The Mummy, in which I had laid the scene in the twenty-second century, and attempted to predict the state of improvement to which this country might possibly arrive." Her final works of fiction were Stories of a Bride, published in 1829 and Conversations on Chronology (1830).

She may have drawn inspiration from the general fashion for anything Pharaonic, inspired by the French researches during the Napoleonic invasion of Egypt; the 1821 public unwrappings of Egyptian mummies in a theatre near Piccadilly, which she may have attended as a girl, and very likely, the 1818 novel by Mary Shelley, Frankenstein; or, The Modern Prometheus. As Shelley had written of the creature reanimated by Victor Frankenstein, "A mummy again endued with animation could not be so hideous as that wretch," which may have triggered her later concept. In any case, at many points she deals in greater clarity with elements from Shelley's book such as the loathing for the much-desired object, the immediate arrest for crime and attempt to use lies to escape arrest. However, unlike the Frankenstein monster, the hideous revived Cheops is not shuffling around dealing out horror and death, but giving canny advice on politics and life to those who befriend him. In some ways The Mummy! A Tale of the Twenty-Second Century may be seen as her reaction to themes in Frankenstein: her mummy specifically says he is allowed life only by divine favour, rather than being indisputably vivified only by mortal science.

Unlike many early science fiction works, such as Shelley's The Last Man, and the anonymously published The Reign of King George VI, 1900–1925, Loudon did not portray the future as her own day with mere political changes. She filled her world with foreseeable changes in technology, society, and even fashion. Her court ladies wear trousers and hair ornaments of controlled flame. Surgeons and lawyers may be steam-powered automatons. A kind of Internet is predicted in it. Besides trying to account for the revivification of the mummy in scientific terms – galvanic shock rather than incantations – "she embodied ideas of scientific progress and discovery, that now read like prophecies" to some later in the 19th century. Her social attitudes have resulted in the book being ranked among proto-feminist novels.

At its initial publication, the book drew many favourable reviews, including one in 1829 in The Gardener's Magazine on the inventions it proposed. (Note: There have been inconsistent interpretations of Loudon's proposals. Adams (1865) says she envisaged a steam-powered plough. The on-line copy of The Mummy!: A Tale of the Twenty-second Century, Volume 1 at Google Books refers only to a steam powered digging-machine on page 71. See §Further reading.))

In total, her works of poetry and fiction were:

- Prose and Verse (1824)
- The Mummy!: Or a Tale of the Twenty-Second Century (1827, revised 1828)
- Stories of a Bride (1829)
- Conversations on Chronology (1830)

== Works of fact: Gardening, horticulture and botany ==
After marriage to John Loudon in 1830, a Scottish botanist, garden designer and author, she re-focused her writing skills onto supporting his works and also writing her own books and periodicals. She had no previous experience in this area and commented, “It is scarcely possible to imagine any person more completely ignorant of everything relating to botany than I was at the period of my marriage with Mr Loudon.” She took on an assistant role to her much older husband. She planted and maintained the gardens at their home in London, and cared for the plants meticulously in order for him to be able to do his research. With her own writing experience, she assisted him in editing his publications, in particular his extensive Encyclopedia of Gardening (1834).

They travelled together in England and Scotland the 1830s and early 1840s as he advised on gardens, estate design and obtained for plant material for his books and periodicals. She also attended public lectures in London by John Lindley to improve her knowledge and provide material. Jane worked closely with her husband for the remainder of his career; they believed gardens were a work of art, as well as manifestations of science. She realized there was a major gap in the market for easy to understand gardening manuals. At the time, all articles were written at a level for those already in the field, and manuals were too technical for the everyday person to understand. With her husband producing these intellectual works it gave her a resource to make gardening understandable and accessible. Her first books were published in 1840 as the cost of illustrations of her husband's book Arboretum et Fruticetum Britannicum put the family into crippling debt.

"Knysana lily (Cyrtanthus obliquus), Cyrtanthus clavatus as C. uniforus, and Scented firelilly (Cyrtanthus odorus).” The ladies’ flower garden of ornamental perennials from The Collection of Botanical Photographs and Illustrations of Swallowtail Garden Seeds.

Jane Loudon wrote gardening books illustrated with her own botanical artwork. Jane Loudon's books gave women hope and power to be able to complete the task of gardening while getting helpful hints on how to do this effectively from her works. She wrote the following books:

- Young Lady's Book of Botany (1838)
- Agnes, or the Little Girl who Kept a Promise (1839)
- Instructions in Gardening for Ladies (1840)
- Gardening for Ladies and Companion to the Flower Garden (1840)
- Ladies' Flower-Garden of Ornamental Annuals (Four volumes 1840 - 1848)
- The Young Naturalist's Journey: or the Travels of Agnes Merton and Her Mama (1840)
- The Ladies' Flower Garden or Ornamental Bulbous Plants (1841)
- The First Book of Botany … for Schools and Young Persons (1841)
- The Ladies Companion to the Flower Garden. Being an Alphabetical Arrangement of all the Ornamental Plants Usually Grown in Gardens and Shrubberies (1841)
- Botany for Ladies or, a Popular Introduction to the Natural System of Plants (1842)
- British Wild Flowers (1845)
- "The Lady's Country Companion or how to enjoy a Country Life Rationally". 1845.
- Amateur Gardener's Calendar (1847)
- Lady's Country Companion at Home and Abroad (edited between 1849 and 1851)
- The Ladies' Flower-Garden of Ornamental Greenhouse Plants (1848)
- Tales About Plants (1853)
- My Own Garden Or, The Young Gardener's Year Book (1855)

Several of these books were very successful; Gardening for Ladies and Companion to the Flower Garden sold 1350 copies on the day it was published in 1840.

She founded the periodical The Ladies Magazine of Gardening in 1842. In late 1849 Loudon began editing The Ladies' Companion at Home and Abroad, a new magazine for women. Successful at first, its sales fell and she resigned. All of these works taught women how to create beautiful gardens, and also enlightened them by giving them "work" to do in a time where they were not allowed to do such tasks. She was encouraged in writing these books by the horticulturalist John Lindley.

"Verbascums". The Ladies' Flower Garden of Ornamental Perennials from the Collection of Botanical Photographs and Illustrations of Swallowtail Garden Seeds (Volume 2, 1844)

== Botanical artist ==
Loudon realized that illustrations were important to convey plant and gardening information. Her artistic style developed over time and as she became more familiar with media and subjects. The style of her illustrations included grouping flowers into bouquets. Her illustrations were popular among women, and have been identified as used for decoupage on tables, trays, and lampshades. Later on, she used the new technique of chromolithography for multicolour prints.

== Personal life ==
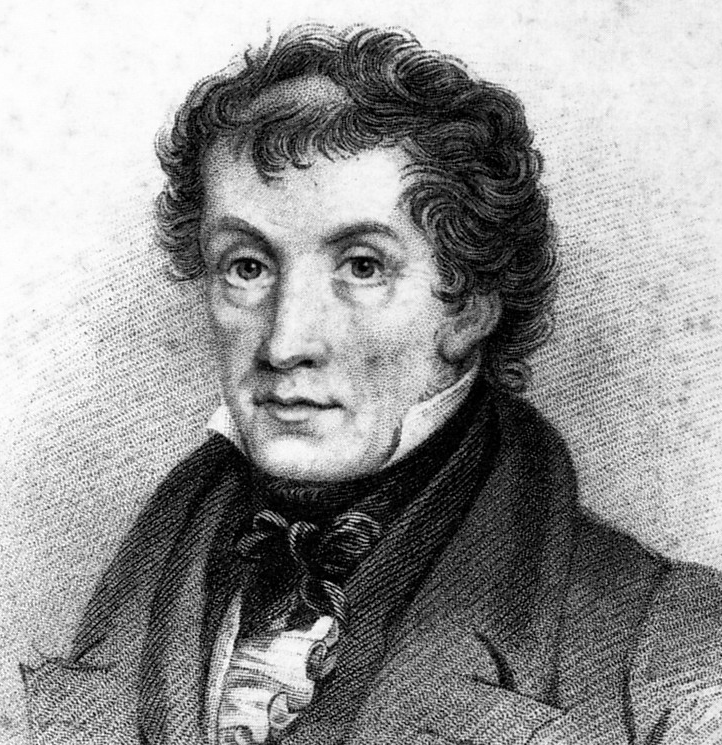
John Claudius Loudon

John Claudius Loudon wrote a favourable review of The Mummy! A Tale of the Twenty-Second Century in The Gardener's Magazine, the first British periodical devoted to horticulture which he had founded and edited. Seeking out the author, whom he presumed to be male, he eventually met Jane Webb in February 1830:

Among other foreshadowings of things that were to be, was a steam plough, and this attracted the attention of Mr. John C. Loudon, whose numerous and valuable works on gardening, agriculture, etc., are so well known, led to an acquaintance, which terminated in a matrimonial connection. (Henry Gardiner Adams, 1857)

They married on 14 September 1830. and lived in Bayswater, London for the rest of their lives. They had a daughter, Agnes Loudon (born 1837 – died 1863), who became an author of children's books. Their circle of friends included Charles Dickens and William Makepeace Thackeray.

Her husband died of lung cancer in 1843, leaving Loudon and their daughter to inherit his debts. She had paid off around £1000 by February 1844. She was given an award from Royal Literary Fund in 1844 and received a "deservedly gained" pension of £100 a year from the Civil List from 1846 onwards.

She died in 1858 and was buried in Kensal Green cemetery, with a monument funded by the Royal Literary fund at Agnes Loudon's request. Her estate was assessed as less than £800 for probate.

== Legacy ==
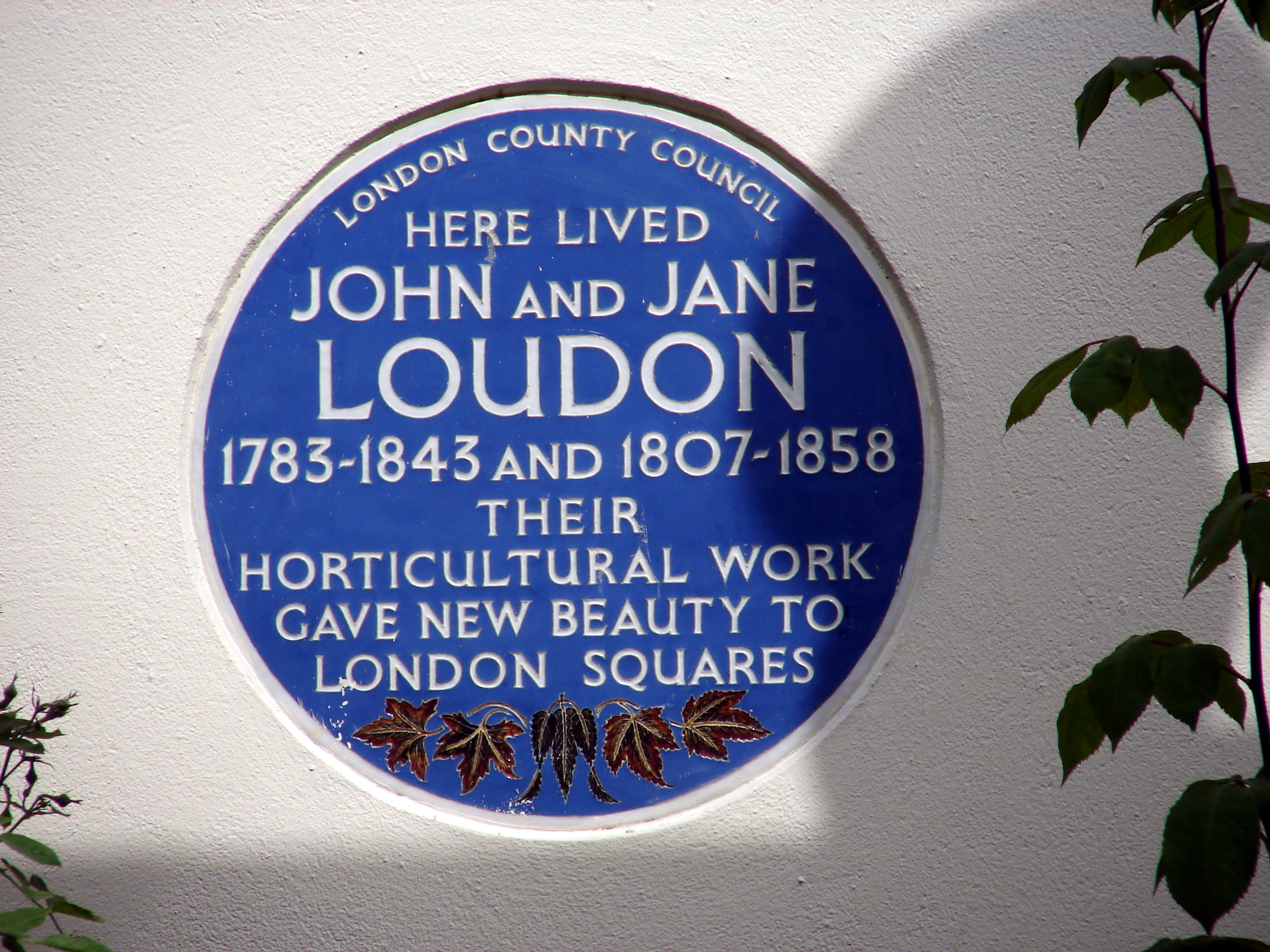
John and Jane Loudon plaque, Bayswater

In 2008 a blue plaque was erected in her honour, by Birmingham Civic Society, at Kitwell Primary School, near the site of Kitwell House.

A blue plaque jointly commemorating the Loudons was erected at their former home, 3 Porchester Terrace, Bayswater in 1953, by London County Council.

== Sources ==
- H.G. Adams, Cyclopaedia of Female Biography; consisting of Sketches of All Women who have been distinguished by Great Talents, Strength of Character, Piety, Benevolence, or Moral Virtue of any kind, forming a complete record of Womanly Excellence or Ability; London, 1865.
- Lisa Hopkins, "Jane C. Loudon's The Mummy!: Mary Shelley Meets George Orwell, and They Go in a Balloon to Egypt", Cardiff Corvey: Reading the Romantic Text 10 (June 2003)
- Oxford Dictionary of National Biography
- Internet Archive, The Mummy!: Or a Tale of the Twenty-Second Century (1827)
- Jane Loudon - History of Early American Landscape Design, September 2021
- Parilla, Lesley. “(Not so) Secret Life of a Woman Naturalist: Mrs. Jane C. Loudon 1807-1858.” Smithsonian Libraries and Archives / Unbound, 6 Mar. 2018
- Whipp, Koren. “Jane Loudon.” Project Continua
