= Paradiesgärtlein =

Painting by the Upper Rhenish Master

Frankfurt Paradiesgärtlein
- Garden of Paradise
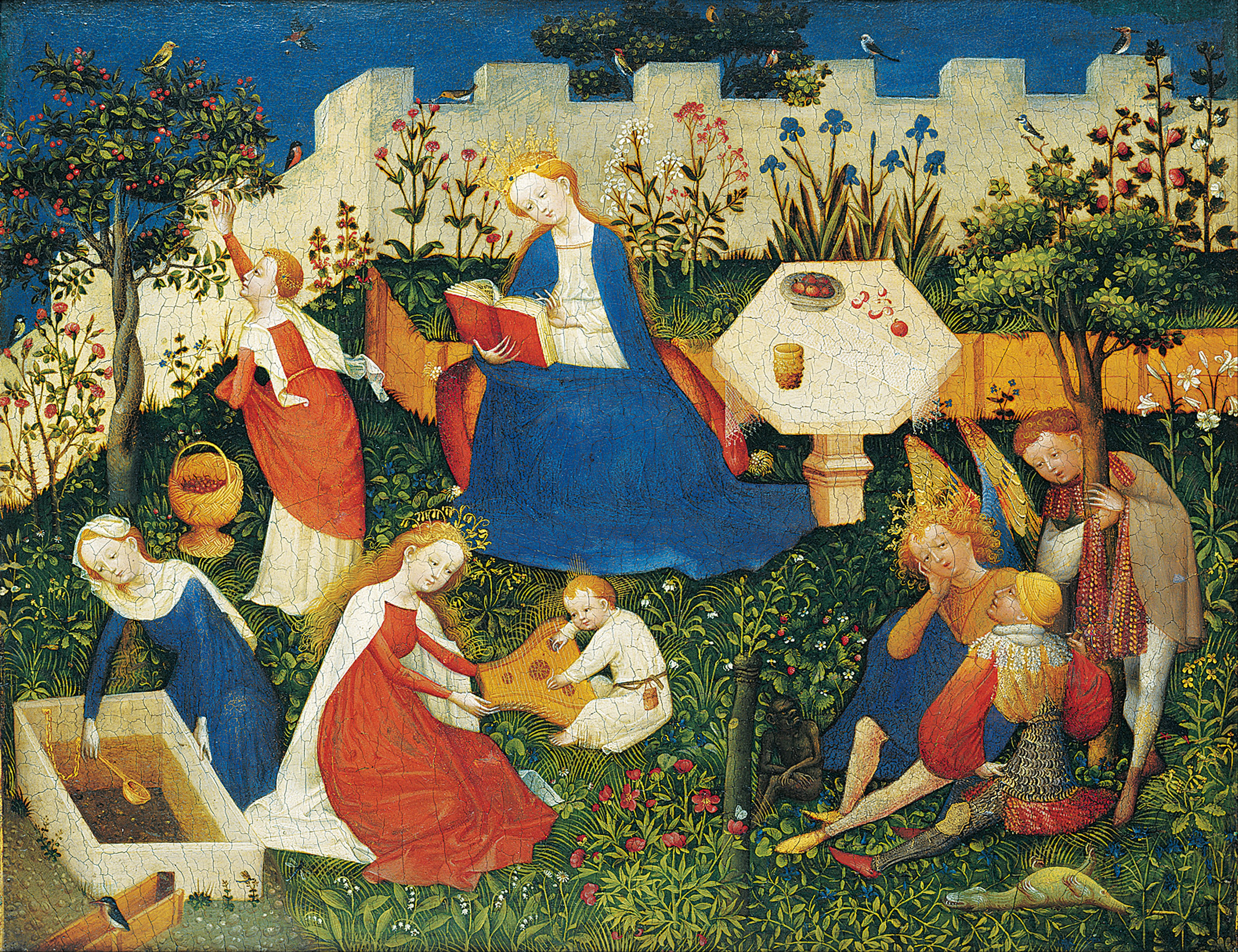
- Artist: Upper Rhenish Master
- Year: c. 1410
- Type: Mixed techniques on oak
- Dimensions: 26.3 cm × 33.4 cm (10.4 in × 13.1 in)
- Location: Städel; Frankfurt

The Paradiesgärtlein (Garden of Paradise) is a panel painting created around 1410 by an unknown painter referred to as Upper Rhenish Master. It belongs to the Mary in the rose bower type. The Paradiesgärtlein is one of the earliest paintings to naturalistically depict flora and fauna.

== Painting ==
The panel painting is created about 1410. The painter is unknown, referred to as the Upper Rhenish Master or formerly Master of the (Frankfurter) Paradiesgärtlein. The painting is executed in mixed techniques on wood; it measures about 26 by 33 centimetres. It is on display at the Städel Museum in Frankfurt, Germany.

== Motif ==
The painting belongs to the Maria im Rosenhag (Mary in the rose bower) type, but the painter adapted that style uniquely. In contrast to depictions current at the time, the Virgin Mary is not depicted in the centre of the image, but in the upper left corner, engrossed in a book. She is surrounded by Saints. To her right, Saint Dorothy is plucking a cherry, Saint Barbara is drawing water from a well, and Saint Cecilia holds a psaltery, on which the Child Jesus is plucking the strings. At the feet of Saint George, there is a small dead dragon, and at those of Archangel Michael, a small black demon. Saint Oswald is leaning against a tree trunk.

== Flora and fauna ==
The Paradiesgärtlein is one of the earliest paintings to naturalistically depict plants; they are all clearly recognisable. Most are Marian symbols. Near the wall, the birds are also realistic. The painting depicts:

Plants

Aquilegia, Veronica, strawberry, Alchemilla, daisy, wallflower, Vinca, cherry, clover, lily, snowflake, lily of the valley, Malva, oxeye daisy, Dianthus, Paeonia, rose, Primula veris, iris, mustard, red deadnettle, violet, Plantago, Chrysanthemum, Aster, Hypericum, Matthiola.

Birds

Common kingfisher, great tit, Eurasian bullfinch, golden oriole, common chaffinch, European robin, great spotted woodpecker, Bohemian waxwing, European goldfinch, long-tailed tit, blue tit, hoopoe.

Insects

Dragonfly, large white

== See also ==
Marian art in the Catholic Church

== Bibliography ==
- Gallwitz, Esther (1992). Kleiner Kräutergarten : Kräuter und Blumen bei den Alten Meistern im Städel (in German). Frankfurt am Main: Insel. ISBN 978-3-458-33120-9. OCLC 29815227.
