= Upper Rhenish Master =

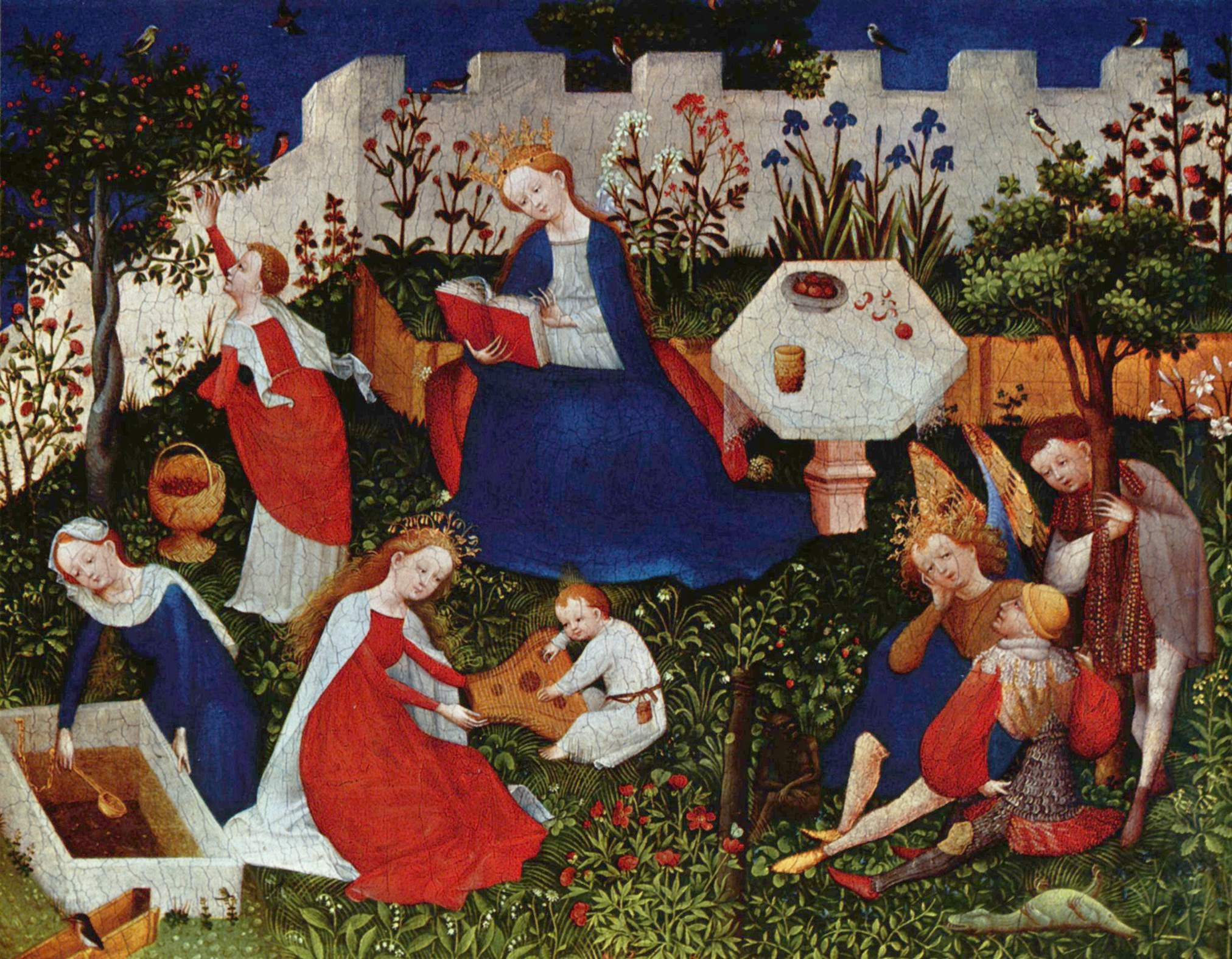
The little Garden of Paradise by Upper Rhenish Master, Städel, 1410/1420

The denomination Upper Rhenish Master refers to an artist active ca. 1410–20 possibly in Strasbourg. The most famous painting of the artist is Paradiesgärtlein (Little Garden of Paradise), a mixed-technique painting on oakwood, 26.3 x 33.4 cm, now in the Städel Museum (on permanent loan from the Historical museum in Frankfurt since 1922). The painting is the Städel's most famous example of the old German school.

In this famous painting, the artist depicts a secluded scene, with Mary the Mother and Jesus the Child in a secluded corner of a castle garden, a peaceful place protected by a wall from the violent outer world. The painter applies the concept of "hortus conclusus," described by Albertus Magnus of Cologne, philosopher and father of the church.

"hortus conclusus" (Lat. 'enclosed garden') a representation of the Virgin and Child in a fenced garden, sometimes accompanied by a group of female saints. The garden is a symbolic allusion to a phrase in the Song of Songs (4:12): 'A garden enclosed is my sister, my spouse'.

Working some two hundred years after Albertus, the Upper Rhenish Master realizes a painting that is designed for the pleasure of spectators, but is also intended to be the vector of spiritual benefits. According to the 13th-century theologian, a pleasurable and sacred garden should contain "pleasant flowers .. trees .. animal .. a spring set in stone .. for its purity .. source of spiritual delectation" for a pious spectator.

Every detail of the Little Garden of Paradise stands for something more than itself. Contemporary people were likely to have been acquainted with the symbols. If, in the Middle Ages few could read, any visual form of communication was an effective instrument in order to spread the faith. The unknown artist has mastered the use of symbols and orchestrates the stage as a playground not only appropriate for holy persons but for the new and upcoming vision of nature that will be a cornerstone in the 15th century.

Among the other works of this anonymous master, two square panels of much larger size than the Frankfurt painting can be seen today in the Musée de l'Œuvre Notre-Dame in Strasbourg: The Nativity of the Virgin and The Doubt of Saint Joseph.

== Bibliography ==
- Nicole Chambon, Les fleurs et les oiseaux du Jardin du Paradis de Francfort (1410-1420), Doctoral thesis under the supervision of Aline le Berre and François Bœspflug, German Studies, University of Limoges, 2011
