= Thomas Hill (gardening author) =

English astrologer, author and translator (1528–1574)

Thomas Hill (ca. 1528 – ca. 1574) was an English astrologer, writer and translator who most probably also wrote as Didymus Mountain.

== Life ==
Hill described himself as a Londoner, who had received a modest education, although this did include a knowledge of Latin and Italian.

== Works ==
He was the author of the first popular book in English about gardening — The profitable arte of gardening — which was first published in 1563 under the title A most briefe and pleasaunte treatyse, teachynge how to dresse, sowe, and set a garden. He went on to write other popular works, such as The Proffitable Arte of Gardening (1568) and The Gardener's Labyrinth (1577). The latter work was originally published after Hill's death under the name of Didymus Mountain, now generally attributed to Thomas Hill. In 1988, the Oxford University Press produced a paperback reprint of this book under the name Thomas Hill. Hill also published works on arithmetic, astrology, the interpretation of dreams and physiognomy.

== Sources ==
- Goodwin, Gordon (1891). "Hill, Thomas (fl.1590)" . In Stephen, Leslie; Lee, Sidney (eds.). Dictionary of National Biography. Vol. 26. London: Smith, Elder & Co.
- Lee, Sidney (1894). "Mountain, Didymus" . In Lee, Sidney (ed.). Dictionary of National Biography. Vol. 39. London: Smith, Elder & Co.
