= Henry Arthur Bright =

British businessman (1830-84)

Henry Arthur Bright (9 February 1830, Liverpool – 5 May 1884, Liverpool) was an English merchant and writer.

== Early life ==
Bright was born in Liverpool on 9 February 1830, the eldest son of Samuel Bright JP (1799–1870; a younger brother of Henry Bright MP and the pathologist Richard Bright), by Elizabeth Anne, eldest daughter of Hugh Jones, a Liverpool banker. The family pedigree goes back to Nathaniel Bright of Worcester (1493–1564), whose grandson, Henry Bright (1562–1627), schoolmaster and canon at Worcester, purchased the manor of Brockbury in the parish of Colwall, Herefordshire, which still remained in the family.

Henry Arthur Bright, who on his mother's side was related to Richard Monckton Milnes, 1st Baron Houghton, was educated at Rugby School, under Archibald Tait, and at Trinity College, Cambridge, where he qualified for his degree, but as a nonconformist was unable to make the subscription then required as a condition of graduation. When this restriction had been removed, Bright and his relative James Heywood were the first nonconformists to take the Cambridge degrees of B.A. (1857) and M.A. (1860).

== In business ==
On leaving Cambridge Bright became a partner with his father in the shipping firm of Gibbs, Bright & Co., by whose enterprise regular communication was established between this country and Australia. In May 1852 he travelled with a friend between Liverpool and New York on the SS Great Britain, which was owned by Gibbs, Bright, & Co. Bright was chairman of the sailors' home in Canning Street in 1867, and again in 1877; in the latter year the dispensary in the Custom House arcade was opened mainly through his exertions, and in August 1878 a second sailors' home, projected by him, was opened in Luton Street.

In 1865 he was placed on the commission of peace for the borough, and in 1870 for the county.

== Literary friendships ==
In Liverpool he held a place akin to that filled by William Roscoe in a previous generation, as a centre of literary interests and literary friendships. He was a member of the Roxburghe Club and of the Philobiblon Society, as well as of the local historical and literary societies. His personal intercourse with literary men and women was very extended and sympathetic, and was sustained by a wide correspondence, in which his own part was characterised by a singular fertility and charm. In the world of letters he will be best remembered by the frequent allusions to him in the "Note-books" and biography of Nathaniel Hawthorne, whose acquaintance he made at Concord, Massachusetts in 1852. The friendship was renewed the following year, when Hawthorne became consul at Liverpool. In 1854 they made a tour of Wales together, and the friendship lasted until Hawthorne's death.

== Later life and death ==
In 1882 his health, never robust, began seriously to give way. He tried the effect of a sojourn in the south of France, and a winter at Bournemouth, but returned to Liverpool in the spring of 1884, and died on 5 May at his residence, Ashfield, Knotty Ash. He is buried at St. John the Evangelist Churchyard, Liverpool. In 1861 he had married Mary Elizabeth, eldest daughter of Samuel H. Thompson of Thingwall Hall, and left three sons and two daughters. His wife died in London in 1925 and is buried at Highgate Cemetery.

== Works ==
He was a Unitarian in religion and a member of the congregation ar Renshaw Street Unitarian Chapel in Liverpool. From 1856 to 1860, he wrote to guide the policy of the Inquirer newspaper towards conservative unitarianism. He wrote also in the Christian Reformer, and contributed occasionally to the Christian Life, established in 1876. One of his most finished public speeches was at the Liverpool celebration of the Channing centennial. As a literary critic Bright wrote for the Examiner, and contributed regularly to the Athenaeum from 1871. His major literary success was the Year in a Lancashire Garden, 1879.

His publications include:

- A Historical Sketch of Warrington Academy, 1859, 8vo (reprinted from the Transactions of the Historic Society of Lancashire and Cheshire, vol. xi.; chiefly drawn up from original papers in his possession).
- The Brights of Colwall, 1872, 8vo (reprinted from The Herald and Genealogist, vol. vii.)
- Some Account of the Glenriddell MSS. of Burns's Poems, 1874, 4to (these manuscripts had been deposited in the Liverpool Athenaeum Library by the widow of Wallace Currie, son of Burns's biographer; Bright first made them known, communicating the unpublished matter to the 'Athenæum' of 1 August 1874).
- Poems from Sir Kenelm Digby's Papers, 1877, 4to (edited for the Roxburghe Club from papers long in the possession of the Bright family).
- A Year in a Lancashire Garden, 1879, 8vo (first published, month by month, in the Gardeners' Chronicle for 1874; fifty copies were privately printed in 1875; the published volume has considerable additions; there are two editions, same year).
- The English Flower Garden, 1881, 8vo (originally contributed as an article to the Quarterly Review, April 1880).
- 'Unpublished Letters from Samuel Taylor Coleridge to the Rev. John Prior Estlin', 1884, 4to (printed for the Philobiblon Society; the letters belong to Coleridge's Unitarian period, and include a previously unprinted poem).
- Poems, a collection of his work from 1850 onwards, was privately printed at The Chiswick Press and published posthumously in 1885.

He also contributed a hymn ('To the Father through the Son') to Hymns, Chants, and Anthems, 1858, edited by John Hamilton Thom for Renshaw Street Unitarian Chapel; and wrote (before 1858) 'The Lay of the Unitarian Church,' a spirited poem, originally contributed to a magazine (Sabbath Leisure, edited by John Relly Beard), and issued anonymously and without date as a tract about 1870. To the same magazine he contributed a prose tale, 'The Martyr of Antioch', illustrating the early history of Arianism; part of this was reprinted in the Christian Freeman.

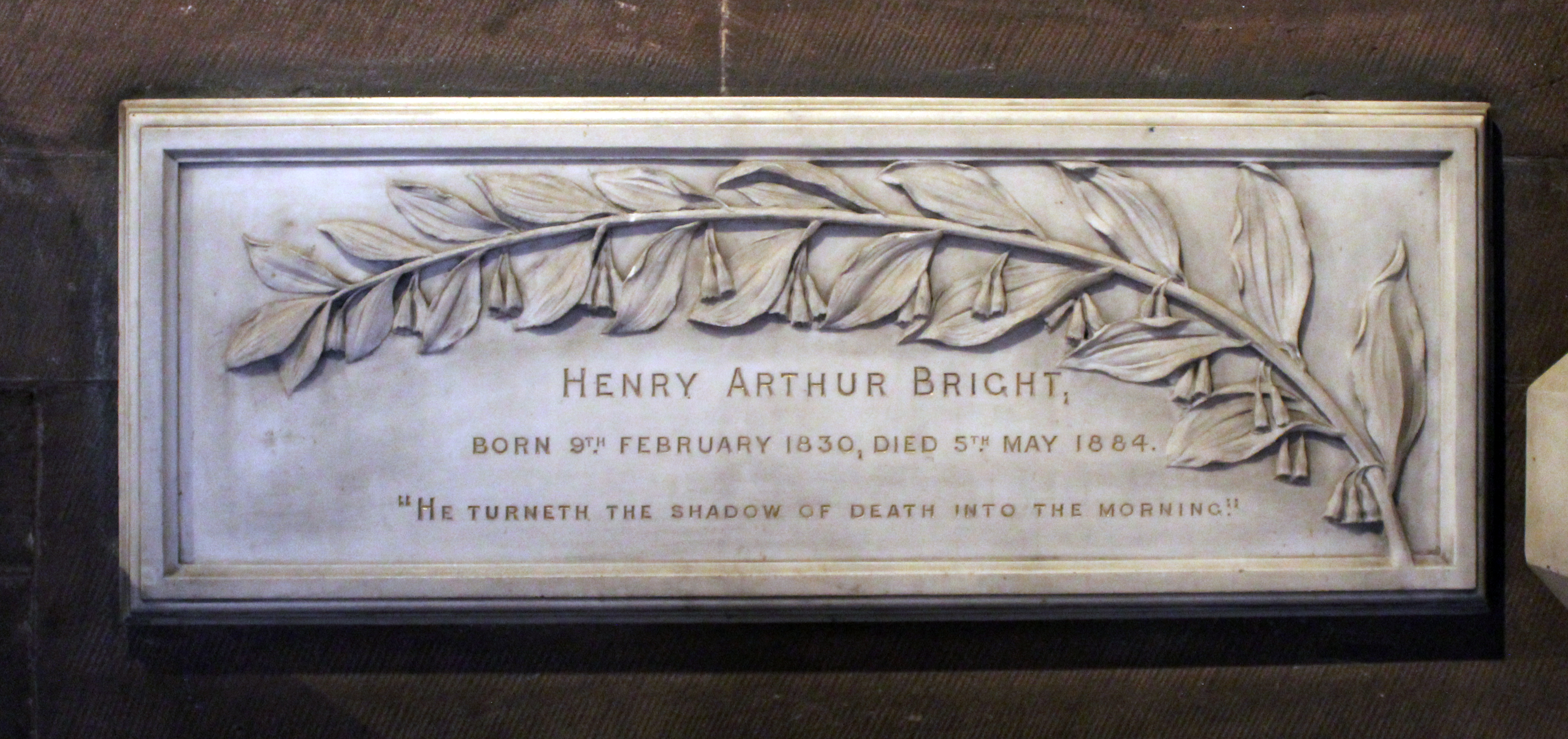
Memorial to Bright in Ullet Road Unitarian Church
