= The Gardener's Magazine =

First periodical devoted to horticulture

The Gardener's Magazine was the first British periodical devoted to horticulture. Full title was The gardener's magazine and register of rural & domestic improvement. It was written, edited and published by John Claudius Loudon starting in 1826. It was initially published quarterly, increased its frequency to bi-monthly and then monthly. The publisher was Longman, Rees, Orme, Brown and Green, and the magazine was based in London. It ceased publication in 1844.
