= The Gardener's Labyrinth =

1577 book by Thomas Hill

The Gardener's Labyrinth or The Gardeners Labyrinth was an early popular book about gardening. It was written by Thomas Hill, using the pseudonym Didymus Mountain, with Henry Dethick, and was published in 1577.

Published three years after Thomas Hill's death, the book was completed by Henry Dethick, who was a friend of Hill's. It was printed by Henry Bynneman.

It contains high-quality woodcut illustrations that show gardeners working in modest-sized gardens. They dig, rake, train climbers over arbours and plant flowers in raised beds, using tools such as mattocks, hedgehooks, shovels, water-tubs, waterspouts and brooms.

The book's instructions for growing cucumbers were reviewed by George William Johnson in 1817. Although the book receives praise for its advice that cucumbers should be grown on a trellis, "that the fruites corrupt not by lying on the earth", Johnson writes that the book's directions are "mingled with many absurdities borrowed from classic authorities".

== Reception ==
The book was popular. It was reprinted five or six times, with its final edition appearing in 1651.

== Thomas Hill ==
Thomas Hill (c. 1528–1574) was a book compiler and translator but also an astrologer. As well as writing books on gardening, he also wrote on astrology, arithmetic, physiognomy and dreams.

In addition, Hill was responsible for A most briefe and pleasant treatise, teaching how to dress, some, and set a garden in 1563, described as the first gardening book to be printed in England.

== Henry Dethick's Completion ==
The book includes a poem, addressed to the reader, in which Dethicks explains his contribution after Thomas Hill's death. "Considering (right honourable) my promise plighted unto my friend (lately entrered) I was informed to performe the perfecting of this English Treatise."

== See also ==
- Wellcome Collection. Links to 26 books by Thomas Hill available online in the Wellcome Collection
- Shakespeare Birthplace Trust High-quality image of a page inside the book, with a figure of a furnace named Baineum Marie
