= Wilderness (garden history) =

Highly artificial and formalized type of woodland

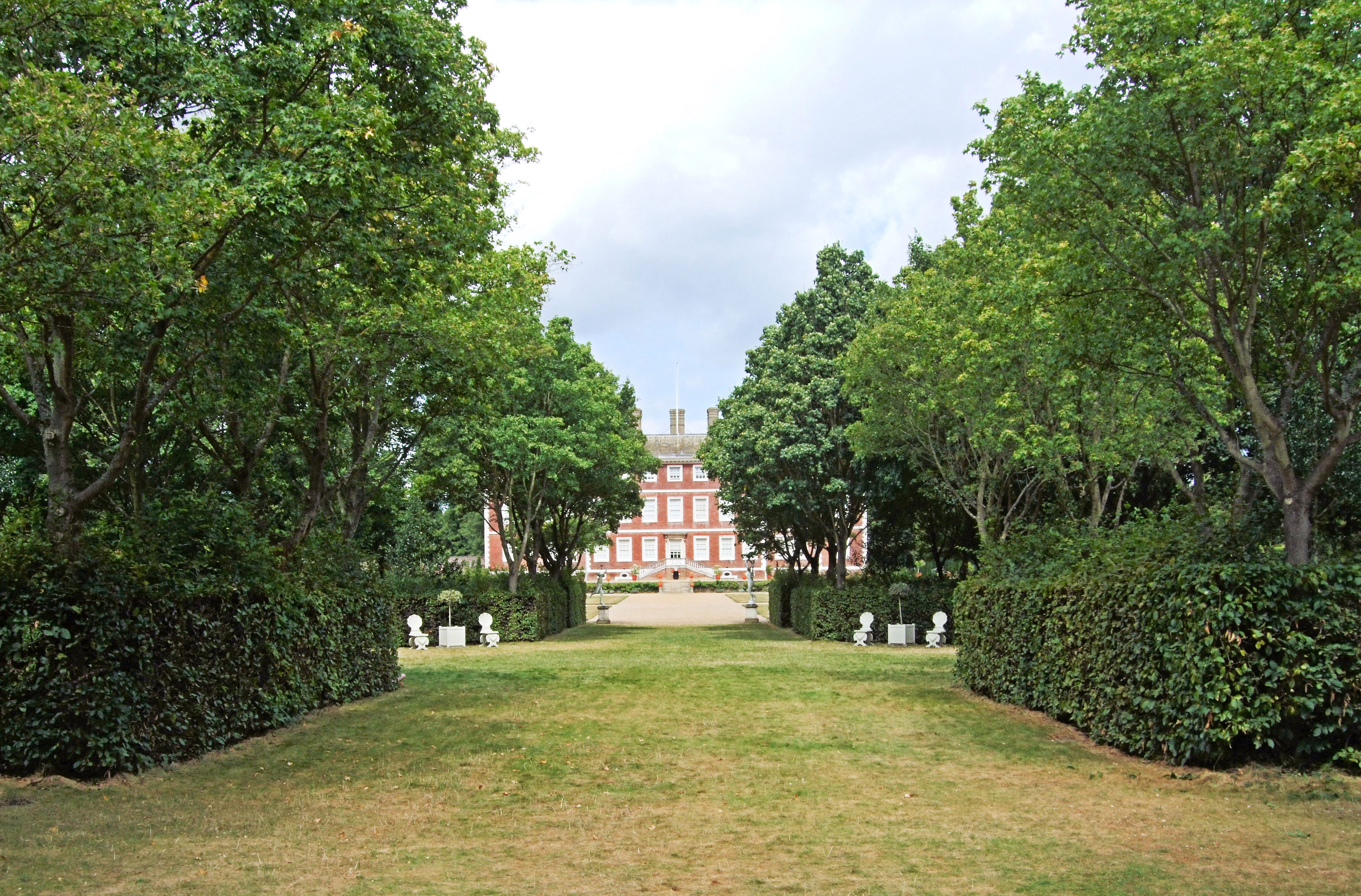
Ham House, near London, seen from the main avenue of the newly replanted wilderness in 2014

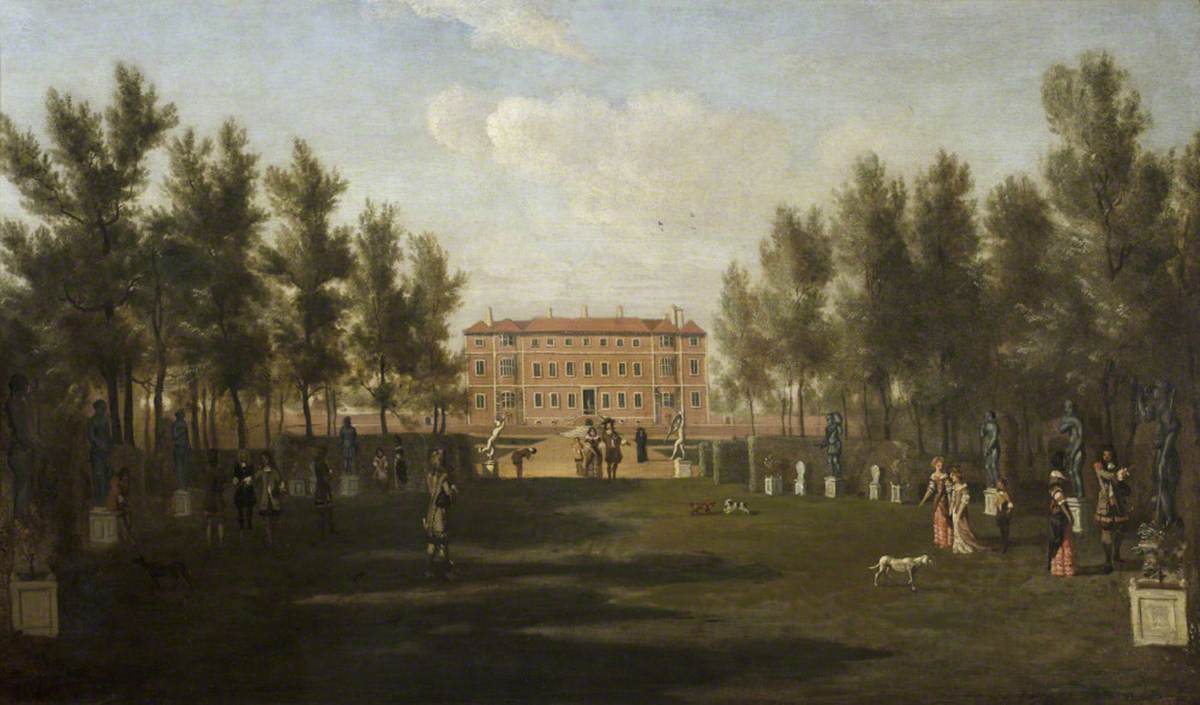
Ham House, attributed to Hendrick Danckerts, late 1670s, used in planning the reconstructed wilderness.

In the Western history of gardening, from the 16th to early 19th centuries, a wilderness was a highly artificial and formalized type of woodland, forming a section of a large garden. Though examples varied greatly, a typical English style was a number of geometrically-arranged compartments (often called "quarters") closed round by hedges, each compartment planted inside with relatively small trees. Between the compartments there were wide walkways or "alleys", usually of grass, sometimes of gravel. The wilderness provided shade in hot weather, and relative privacy. Though often said by garden writers at the time to be intended for meditation and reading, the wilderness was much used for walking, and often flirtation. There were few if any flowers, but there might be statues, and some seating, especially in garden rooms or salle vertes ("green rooms"), clearings left empty. Some had other features, such as a garden maze.

The wilderness was planted close, but not too close, to the main house, often beyond the parterres, or at an oblique angle to the garden front; garden critics often complained they were too close or too far. If there was a far-reaching view from the house, the wilderness was not supposed to obstruct it, but if the garden adjoined buildings, obstruction of the view to these might be an advantage. Generally the garden front of the house opened to a terrace followed by an area set out in parterres, often including "plats" of plain grass. Wilderness areas would be beyond or beside this.

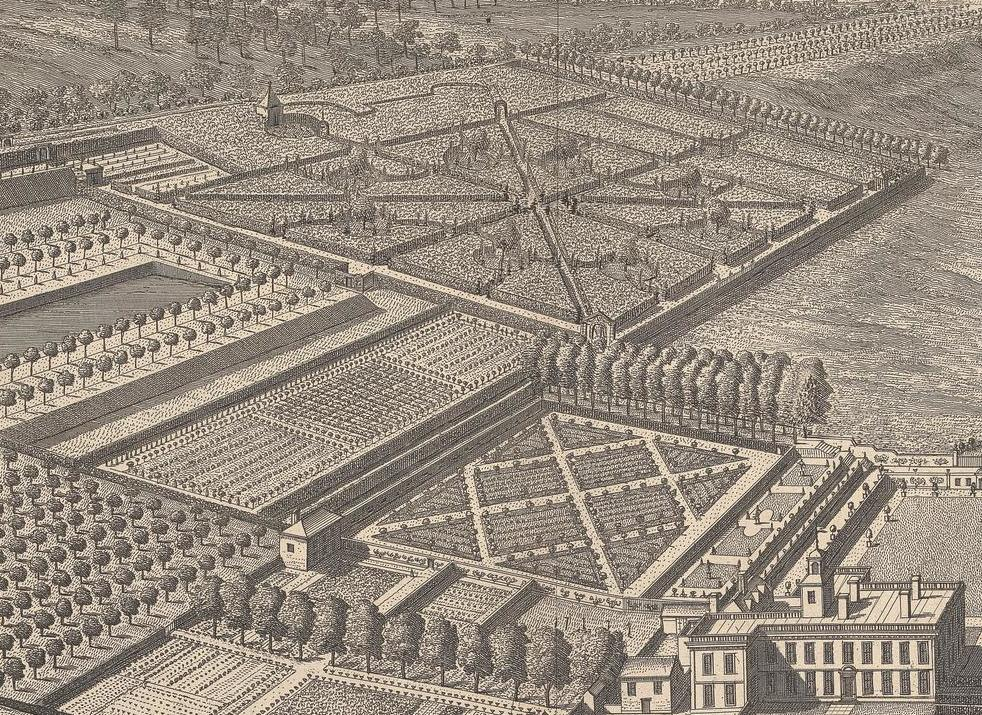
Jan Kip, Fair Lawn in ye County of Kent, 1707 (detail). The wilderness, partly in a "Union Jack" design, lies across the top of the image. The quarters are palisaded, with few internal paths.

The wilderness broadly equates to one type of the French bosquet, and that term was sometimes used in English at the time; the rather vague term "grove" is also often used, for these but sometimes apparently for any group of trees, regardless of their height or formal placing. But the French examples were more likely to plant the trees in a regular pattern, and using the same species. In particular the French bosquet may consist only of trees set out in lines, and not have hedges around the groups of trees; this type is still very common in urban squares in France. The full French formal garden was likely to include bosquets with hedges, which in continental examples were often higher than was usual in England, shown in depictions dwarfing walkers in the garden, as those in the gardens of Versailles still do. The trees were usually deciduous, giving shade in summer, and letting in more light in winter.

The wilderness fell from fashion with the rise in the 18th century of the English landscape garden, and specifically the new form of the shrubbery. In the 19th century, with the Romantic movement and an increasing number of garden plants new to Europe, a new type of much more natural woodland garden emerged, combining a more or less natural woodland setting with choice specimens of shrubs, flowers and trees. Most wildernesses were turned into these other types of garden, or gradually reverted to woodland as the trees grew. There have been some reinstatements in recent years, as at Ham House, near London.

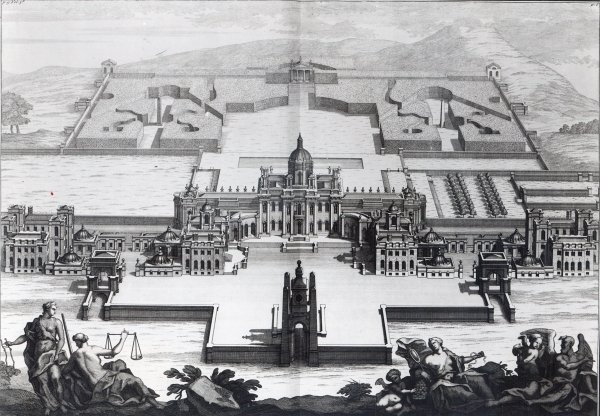
Castle Howard in 1725, with wildernesses at top, by Colen Campbell. Rather unusually for England, these were evergreen.

== Term ==
The English word "wilderness", meaning "wild land" is first recorded in the 13th century, but became well known from the translations into English of the Bible by John Wycliffe in the late 14th century and others, including the Authorized Version ("King James Bible" to Americans) of the early 17th century. In Biblical contexts it referred to the arid "treeless wasteland" covering much of the Holy Land, and even with the limited awareness of Middle Eastern geography of most English people, the term was probably understood along these lines. In Samuel Johnson's Dictionary (1755) it is defined as: "a desert; a tract of solitude and savageness" (supported by quotations from poets that do not entirely reflect this definition). The garden sense is not covered, though it must have been known to Johnson.

However the deeper history of words related to "wild" in northern European languages suggests that older connections to heavily-forested land may have lingered in English consciousness. Otherwise the garden meaning of the term is rather perverse, as the garden wilderness is anything but truly "wild". Regardless of climate and vegetation, the biblical references establish the wilderness as a place of solitude, away from crowds, and this was an important part of the garden meaning.

An early use of "wilderness" for a bosquet is the description by surveyors of that made for Queen Henrietta Maria at Wimbledon House in the 1640s. Though "wilderness" was the most usual English term for the formal garden areas described here, a number of other terms might be used, especially for areas whose layout placed them on the edges of the definition above. These included grove, bosquet, clump, shrubbery, boscage, thicket, plantation, wood, coppice, and copse, most generally suggesting a less formal arrangement.

The French bosquet adapted its name from the Italian boschetto ("little wood") or just bosco ("wood").

== History ==
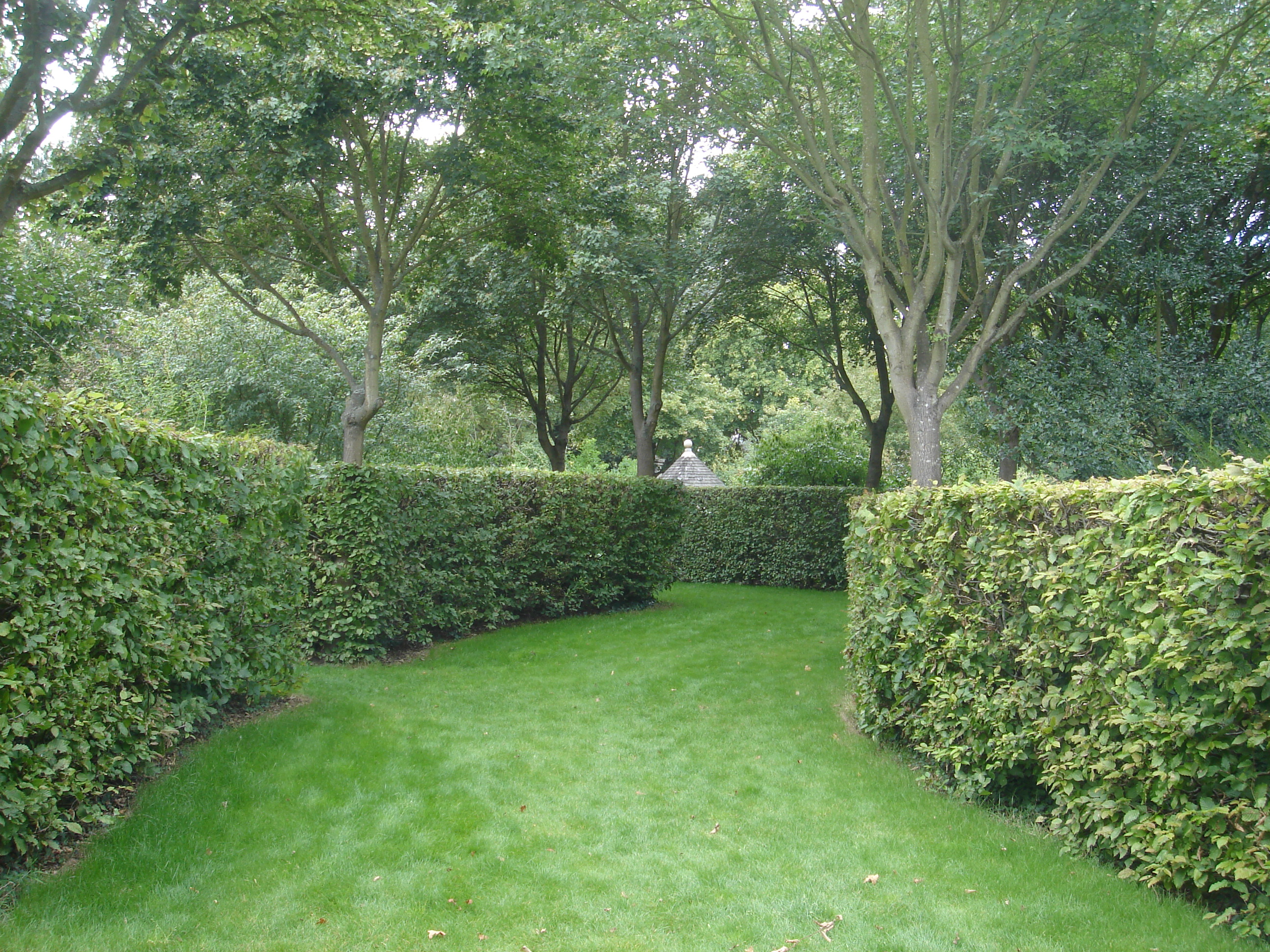
Inside the Ham House Wilderness, 2011

Writing of the similar areas in Italian gardens, Edith Wharton wrote that "the ilex or laurel walks beyond were clipped into shape to effect a transition between the straight lines of masonry and the untrimmed growth of the woodland to which they led, and that each step away from architecture was a nearer approach to nature." The first English wilderness, now lost, may have been that added in the 1540s to Nonsuch Palace near London, while John Lumley, 1st Baron Lumley was its "custodian". Lumley had travelled to Italy, and was a great art collector. According to a visitor this included a great variety of species, many producing fruit or nuts, and also a number of caged exotic animals, a medieval touch not often seen later, except for aviaries. Blickling Hall had one from the 1620s, later replaced by a different one in the 18th century.

The main period for creating wildernesses was about "1690–1750, probably peaking around 1735–1740", although Jan Kip's earlier aerial perspective prints suggest that the greatest houses had them by 1710 or before. Distinct features of the early English wilderness seem to have been that many, up to about 1720, were walled gardens separated from the rest of the garden, the walls often used for training fruit, and that there were also many with fruit trees inside the quarters; these observations come from images and do not reflect the leading gardening books of the period.

Designs varied with the site, but the most common is what is now called the "Union Jack" style, in French an étoile ("star"), with alleys at regular angles intersecting at a central point.

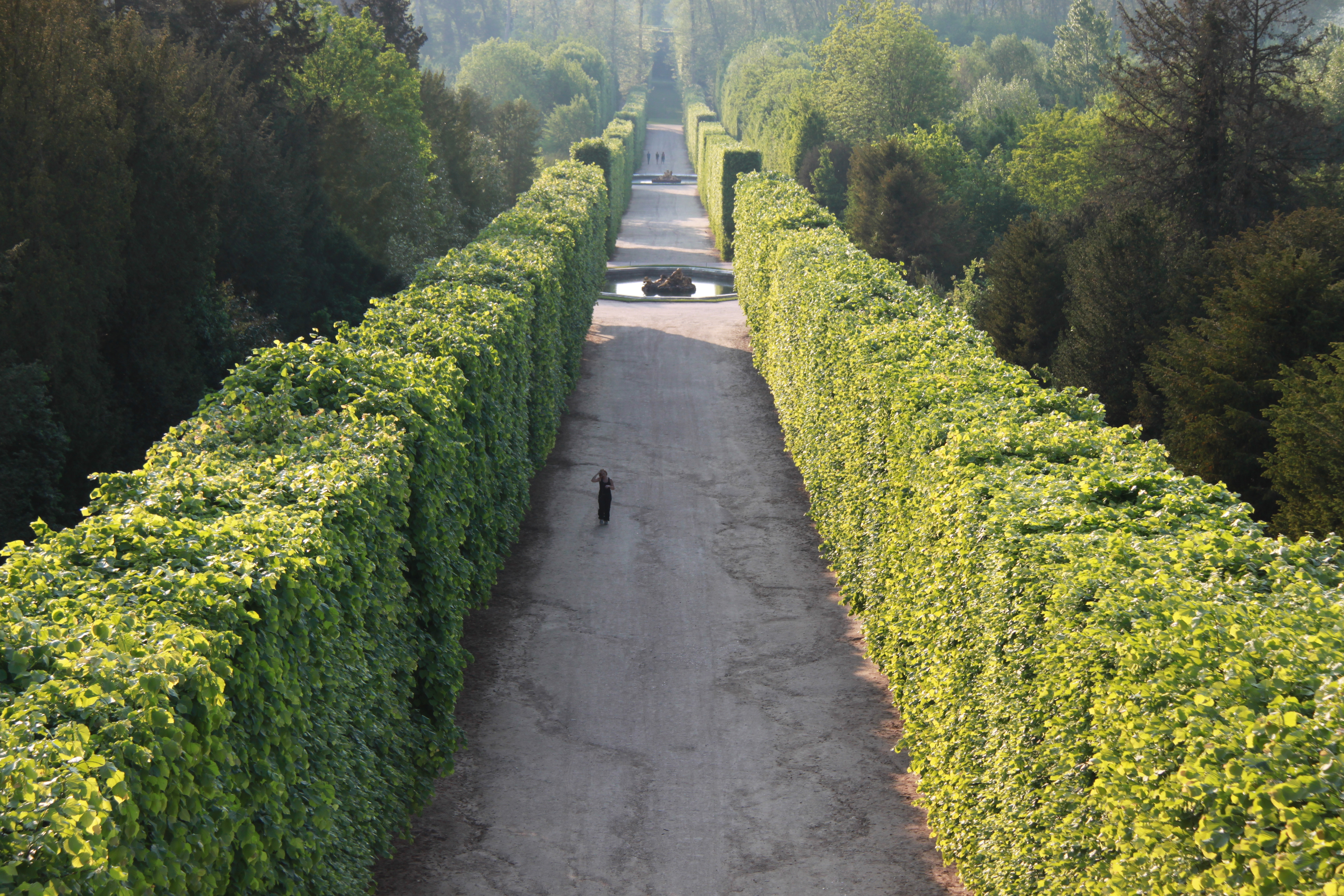
The full French formal style; a walk in a bosquet in the Gardens of Versailles.

The relatively well-documented decision before 1718 not to turn Ray or Wray Wood at Castle Howard into a formal wilderness, as had been proposed by George London, is taken by garden historians as a significant point, "decisive for the development of the 'natural' style of English landscape". This was a natural wood, to the side of the main axis of the garden of the newly-built house, which was instead "turned into a labyrinth of tangled paths, enlivened by various fountains", but at least initially, little special planting. Stephen Switzer, an advocate of ornamental woodland, may have been involved with the new design.

The start of the conversion of the wilderness into the shrubbery (a word first recorded in 1748) can be seen by comparing the books of Richard Bradley, whose New Improvements of Planting and Gardening of 1719 recommended yew as "of great use for Hedges, and make most agreeable Divisions in Gardens; it is customary to fence in the Quarters of Wilderness Works with these Plants, where they have a very good Effect. .", whereas by 1754 Philip Miller in The Gardeners Dictionary, though accepting of the old style, preferred edging the "quarters" or compartments with graduated shrubs and flowers:

By this Distribution you will have the Pleasure of the flowering Shrubs near the Sight, whereby you will be regaled with their Scent, as you pass through the Walks; which is seldom observed by those who plant Wildernesses; for nothing is more common than to see Roses, Honeysuckles, and other small flowering Shrubs, placed in the Middle of large Quarters, under the Dropping and Shade of large Trees, where they seldom thrive.... there should be some smaller Serpentine-walks through the Middle of the Quarters, where Persons may retire for Privacy. . . By the sides of these private Walks may also be scattered some Wood-flowers and Plants, which, if artfully planted, will have a very good Effect."

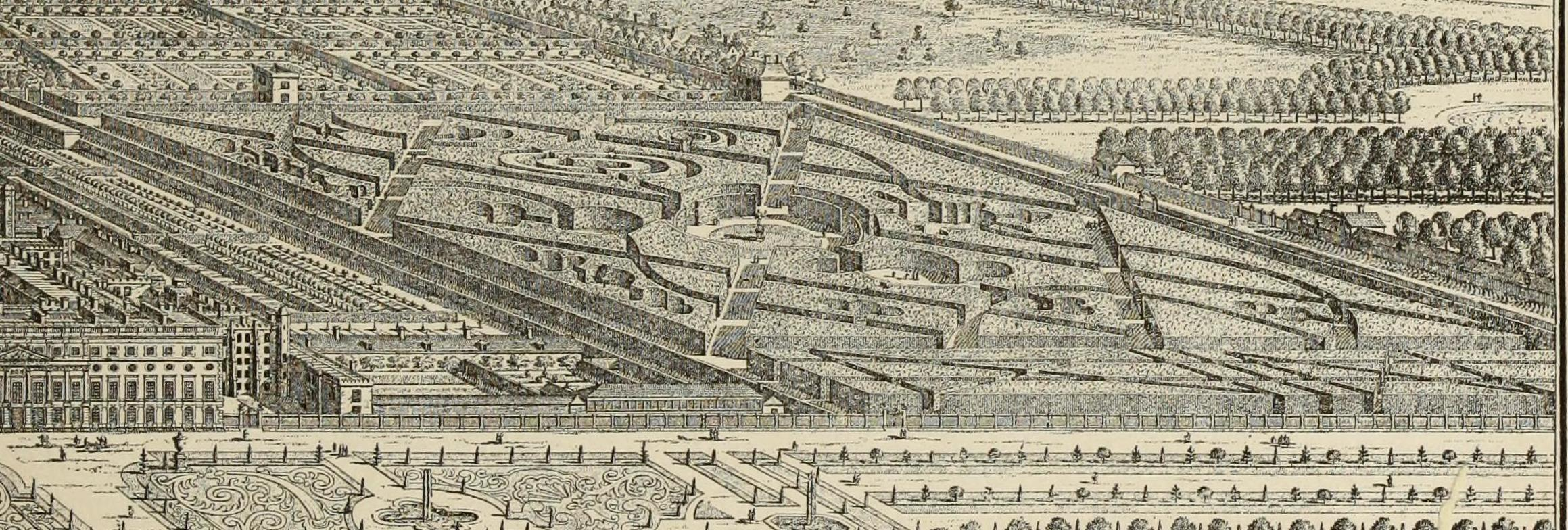
"The Wilderness", now lost, at Hampton Court Palace, after Jan Kip, c. 1715

The well-documented Wilderness at Hampton Court Palace, the leading English royal garden between Henry VIII and Queen Anne, is indicative of the rise and fall of the wilderness. On the north side of the palace, what had been "The King's New Orchard", planted in 1531 by Henry VIII, was replanted as a wilderness under Charles II in the 1680s. This included four mazes, the largest of which is the only remaining part of the wilderness. In Daniel Defoe's Tour Through the Whole Island of Great Britain (1724–27) it received much praise, described as

"cast into a Wilderness with a Labyrinth and Espaliers … not only well designed and completely finished but is perfectly well kept and the Espaliers fill’d exactly, at the bottom to the very Ground, and are led up to proportion’d Heights on the Top; so that nothing of that kind can be more beautiful".

But when a revised posthumous edition was published in 1742, Samuel Richardson, the new editor, commented that

"to every Person of Taste it must be very far from affording any Pleasure, since nothing can be more disagreeable than to be immured between Hedges, so as to have the Eye confined to a straight Walk, and the Beauty of the Trees growing in the Quarters, intirely secluded from the eye".

The whole design remained largely intact until the 1850s, mainly because Hampton Court ceased to be lived in by the royal family; now the area is mostly cleared, with grass and a large display of bulbs in spring. But the largest maze, now replanted, was very popular with the public, and kept.

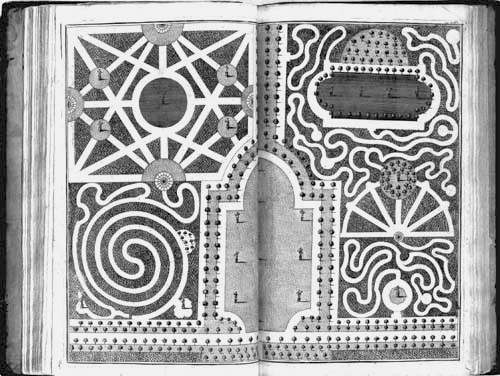
Plan with serpentine walks, from Batty Langley, 1726.

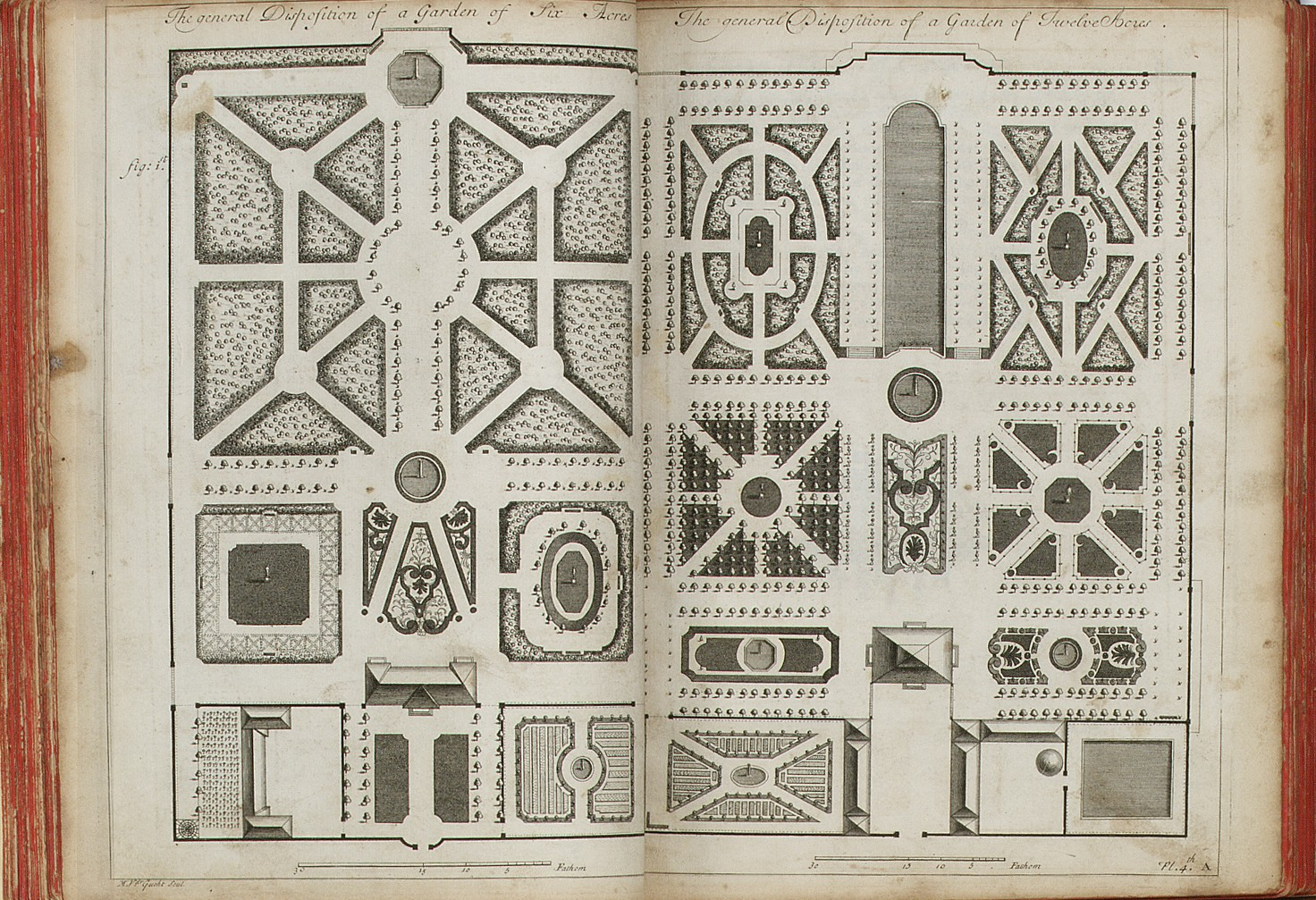
Opening from the 1712 English edition of The Theory and Practice of Gardening – Wherein is Fully Handled all that Relates to Fine Gardens, Commonly called Pleasure-Gardens, as Parterres, Groves, Bowling-Greens &c. by Dezallier d'Argenville. Suggested schemes for gardens of 6 (left) and 12 (right) acres, both including wildernesses at top.

Already by 1712 the wilderness at Rendcomb House in Gloucestershire, as etched by Kip, was laid out with irregular curving walks, except for the main straight and wide walk aligned to the house. This may have been because of its steeply sloping site, and because it was formed from an existing wood by the subtractive method. St Paul's Walden Bury, laid out in the 1730s, is a rather late garden with straight walks in the old style, and the "most perfect surviving" English example.

In surviving wildernesses the hedges often became lower, to open up the view, by the 1730s, and Batty Langley suggested planting bulbs within the quarters. In the previous decade there had been a brief fashion for hedge-less "high stemmed groves", trees all stripped bare of side branches up to 20 feet or more; an early one was planted about 1716 at Chiswick House.

== Planting ==
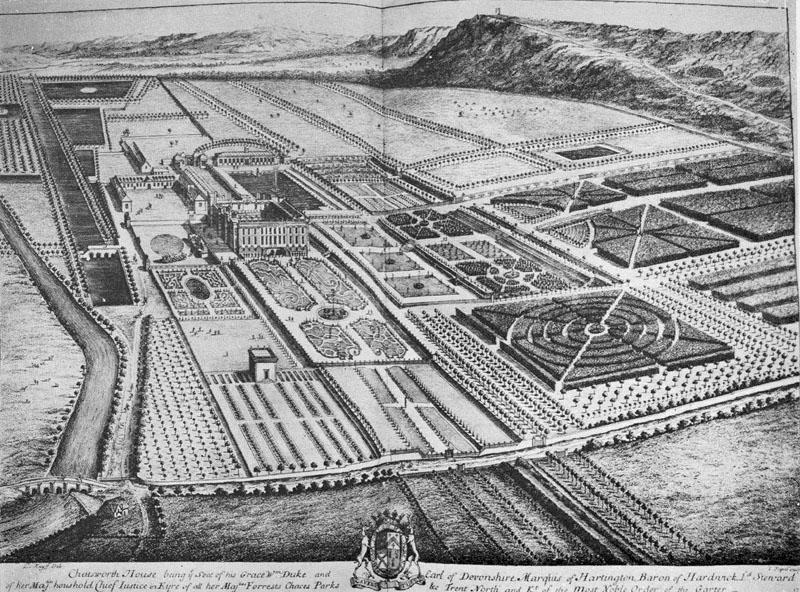
Chatsworth in 1699, with several wildernesses to the right, including one with circular walks. Of Scots pine, they were cut down in the 1730s.

The planting of wildernesses varied considerably, but the most common scheme, as at Ham House, involved hedging around the edges of a "quarter", and trees within. Both elements might be evergreen, but usually were not. The height of hedges varied from the huge ones of the French—some 20 feet at Versailles—to those around shoulder height, but in the 17th century were generally over 10 feet high. In newly-planted wildernesses it would take some years for high hedges to reach their full height. The height of the trees might be kept the same by pruning, or planted and pruned so that they sloped up towards the centre of the quarter in a "pyramid". They were generally small or medium-sized; a few writers recommended fruit trees. They might be of varied species, or all the same (perhaps more common). They might be planted in a regular geometric scheme, or more randomly. Especially in large and late examples, there might be paths leading into the interior of the quarter, but more often it was fully enclosed, although there were no doubt small gaps left for the gardeners to push through for maintenance.

Where the area for a wilderness was already woodland, as was often the case in the gardens of new houses, a subtractive method of making a wilderness could be used, making paths through the area, and removing the larger trees. This produced timber to offset the cost. The paths were usually along a straight line until a decade or two into the 18th century, when coiling serpentine paths inside the quarters became fashionable.

As in the gardens of Versailles, hornbeam was the most popular choice for hedging round the compartments, though yew and box could be used, with a variety of trees suggested for planting inside them, including some evergreens, which were recommended for surrounding bowling greens, to prevent autumn leaves on the playing surface. Perhaps the most analysed wilderness of all, though fictional, is that at Mansfield Park in the novel by Jane Austen, which is described as:

A considerable flight of steps landed them in the wilderness, which was a planted wood of about two acres, and though chiefly of larch and laurel, and beech cut down [hedging the quarters], and though laid out with too much regularity, was darkness and shade, and natural beauty, compared with the bowling-green and the terrace. They all felt the refreshment of it, and for some time could only walk and admire.

Typically, it is located at the far end of the garden:

The lawn, bounded on each side by a high wall, contained beyond the first planted area a bowling-green, and beyond the bowling-green a long terrace walk, backed by iron palisades, and commanding a view over them into the tops of the trees of the wilderness immediately adjoining.

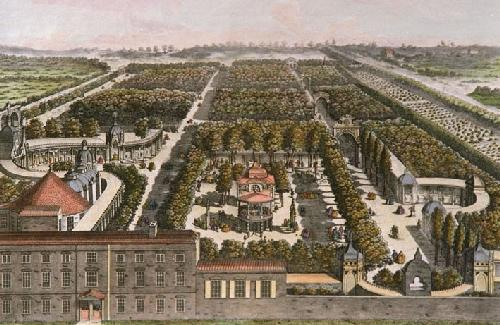
Vauxhall Gardens by Samuel Wale, c.1751. The entertainment areas at the front give way to large wilderness areas at the rear.

Jane Austen's brother Edward had a "small wilderness" at Chawton House, Hampshire; from 1809 Jane and her mother and sister lived in the same village at Chawton Cottage. It can be shown that she was familiar with various other gardens with wildernesses. Despite a number of useful references to garden features in her writings, she does not seem to have been especially interested in gardening, and in particular, like very many at this time of transition, has a rather vague sense of what a "shrubbery" was, and how it might be distinguished from a wilderness.

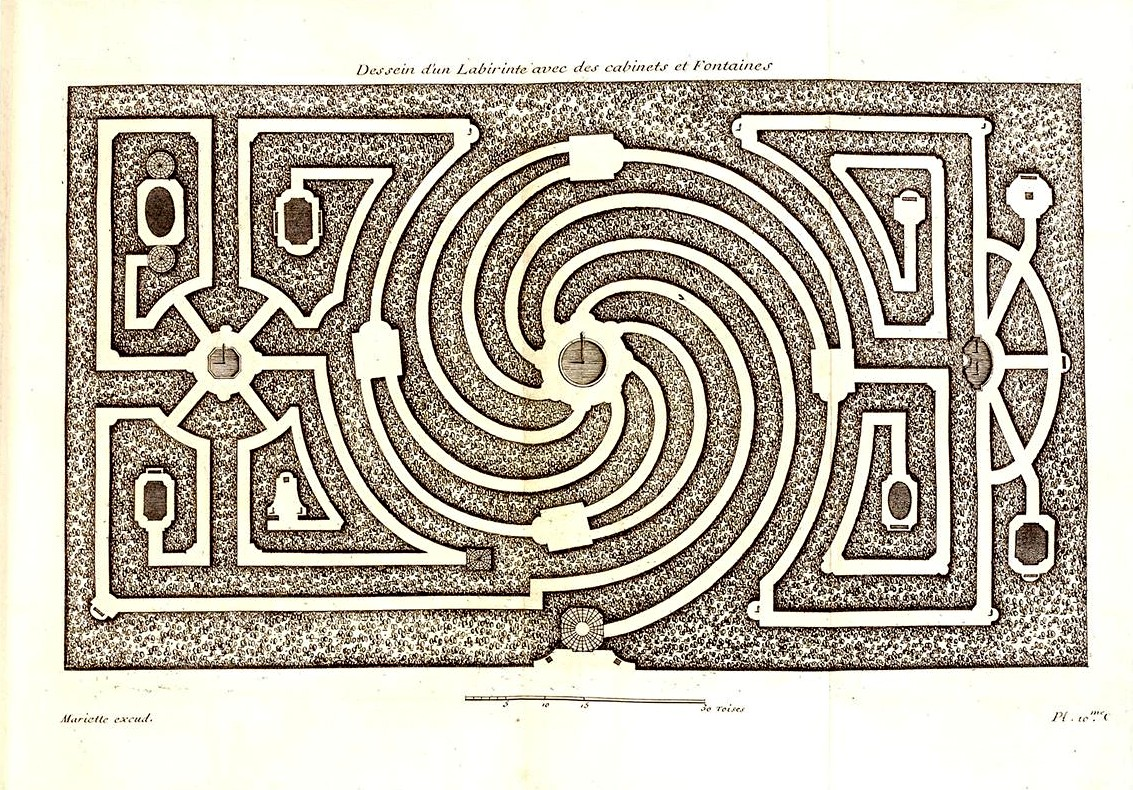
"Dessein d'un Labyrinte avec des cabinets et Fontaines", Dezallier d'Argenville, 1709

Major intersections of walks, and "glades" or garden rooms, ideally included a feature of interest, whether a fountain, a piece of sculpture, or a larger specimen tree. The insides of quarters might contain orchards, orangeries or parts of the kitchen garden, or a bowling green, which was considered an essential feature of large gardens. Some had low hedges and had grass, bulbs and wild flowers inside.

== Moral aspects ==
Though writers praised the role of the wilderness for improving reading and conversation, the high degree of privacy they offered led to concerns about their potential for moral laxity. Jane Austen exploited this in Mansfield Park, where her narrator Fanny Price walks through the wilderness at Sotherton with the other characters. Fanny is left alone in the wilderness, Edmund and Mary find privacy for a long conversation, and the other young people "wander about" unsupervised. However, the truly scandalous event takes place when a couple leaves the manicured "wilderness" gardens for the wider park. The public pleasure gardens that proliferated in 18th-century English cities, mostly featured large areas set out as wildernesses, and a description of Vauxhall Gardens in London from 1760 gives a rather tongue-in-cheek account:

The ladies that have an inclination to be private, take delight in the close walks of Spring-Gardens, where both sexes meet, and mutually serve one another as guides to lose their way; and the windings and turnings in the little wildernesses are so intricate, that the most experienced mothers have often lost themselves in looking for their daughters." from Thomas Brown, "Works Serious and Comical in Prose and Verse" (1760)

== In America ==
Despite the relative abundance of real natural wilderness, a number of houses in British North America had wildernesses. William, son of Arthur Middleton, had two in South Carolina by the 1730s. A house on Hog Island near Charleston, South Carolina, was advertised in 1734 as having "A delightful Wilderness with shady Walks and Arbours, cool in the hottest Seasons", and other owners included George Washington at Mount Vernon, Thomas Jefferson and John Penn. From such descriptions as are given, most American wildernesses seemed to lack the clipped hedges of English examples, and probably tended more to being shrubberies or woodland gardens in stricter terminology; indeed Washington sometimes seems to use "shrubbery" and "groves" to describe what he mostly calls his (two) wildernesses.
