= Garden room =

Partly enclosed space within a garden

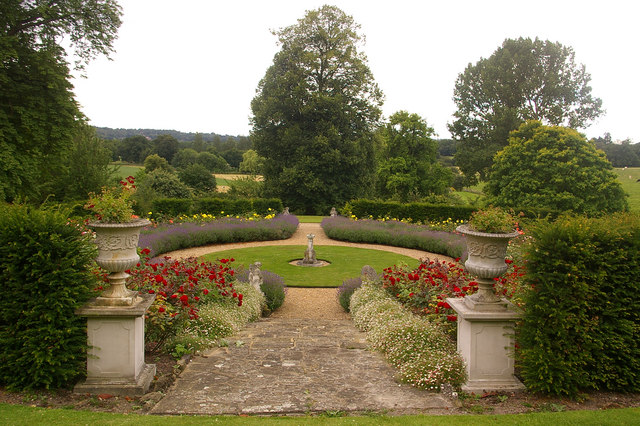
The "Queen Elizabeth II Rose Garden", Titsey Place, planted in 2008

In gardening, a garden room is a secluded and partly enclosed space within a garden that creates a room-like effect. Such spaces have been part of garden design for centuries. Generally they are regarded as different from terraces and patios just outside a building, although in practice these are often the parts of a garden that are most used as a room, with tables and chairs. Walls and hedges may form part of the boundaries of a garden room, but plants, usually at least a few feet tall, will do as well. Apart from the entrances to the room, these should normally enclose the space. There may be furniture, especially for sitting down, but this is not essential.

In architecture, the term "garden room" may be used for a sunroom, conservatory, or any room with a good view of a garden, or even one decorated with a garden theme. A small single-roomed building for leisure in a garden is usually called a summer house, gazebo, or garden house.

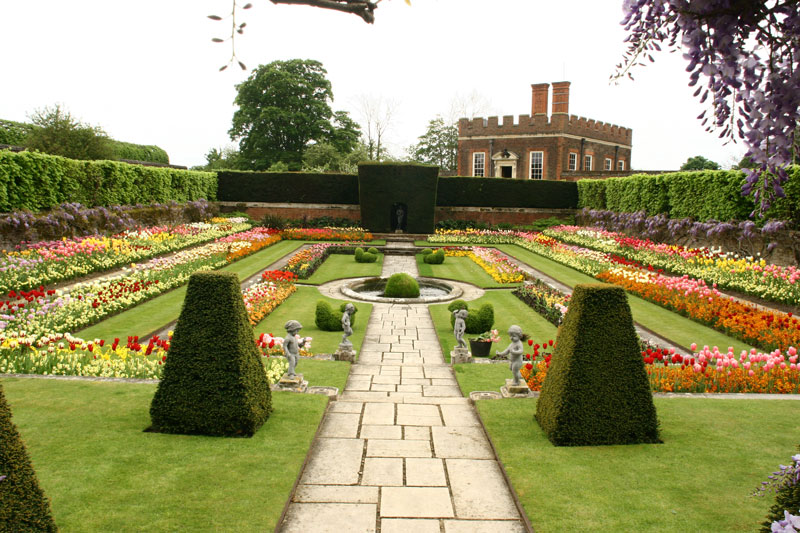
"Dutch-style" garden at Hampton Court Palace

Below a certain size a very small garden can hardly help being room-like, and the term is mostly used for larger gardens, where distinct areas are possible. Garden rooms can introduce variety and structure to a garden, and be suitable spaces for displays that are especially seasonal. In cold or windy areas, the garden room may offer necessary shelter to the plants inside, a factor in their use at Hidcote Manor Garden.

The term is not liked by some gardeners, and others consider it to be "overused".

== History ==
=== Ancient and medieval ===
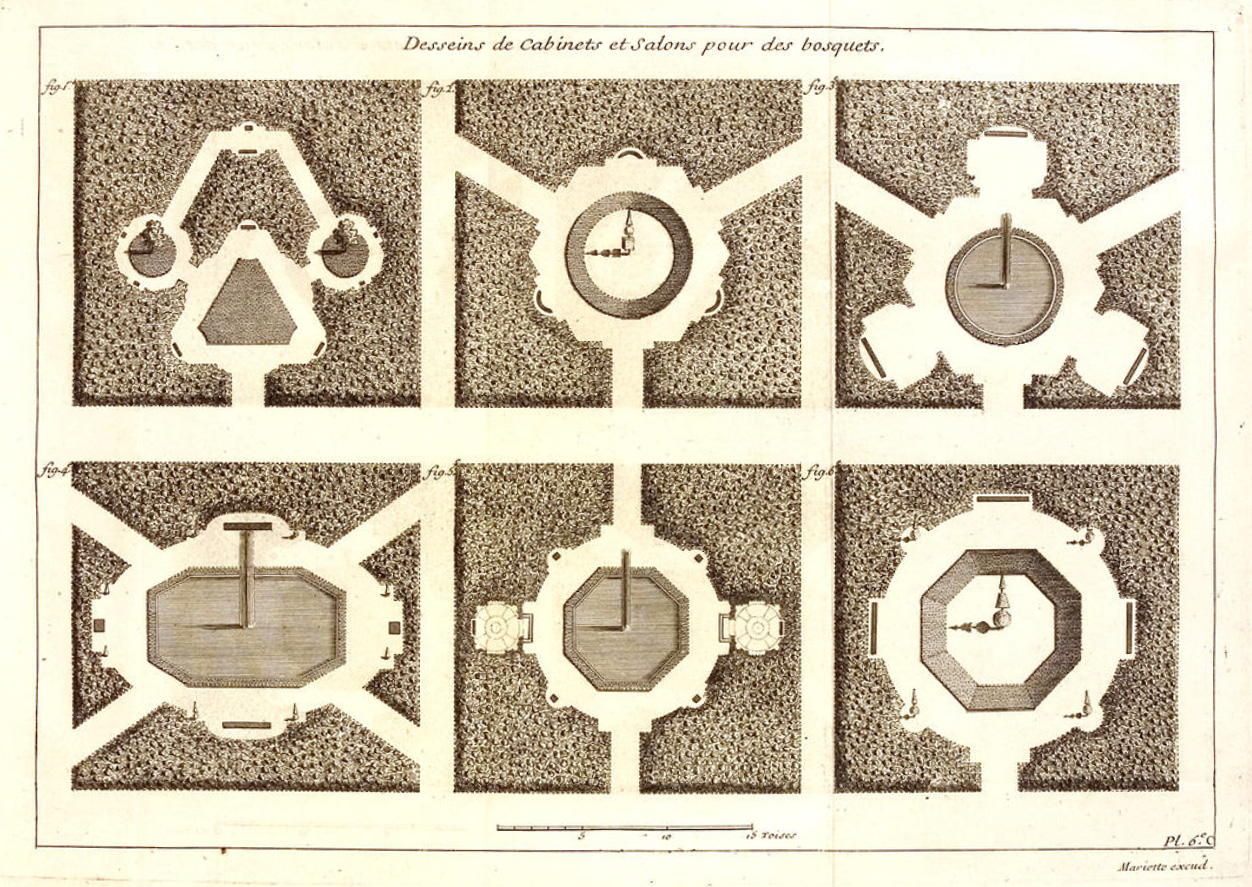
"Desseins de Cabinets et Salons pour des bosquets", illustration from La Théorie et la pratique du jardinage, Dezallier d'Argenville, 1709

Jenny Uglow talks of the "garden rooms" described by Pliny the Younger in his letters giving long, but difficult to interpret, accounts of his two very large country villa gardens. These were by the sea and in the Tuscan hills, the latter with many terraces, and Pliny stresses the views to outside the garden.

Enclosure was "the prime characteristic of all medieval gardens and parks" according to John Dixon Hunt, and contemporary illustrations and literary accounts of gardens place great emphasis on the controlled entries to what were very often walled gardens, with further sub-divisions within. The hortus conclusus, a setting for the Virgin Mary, is the most famous type of these, but the secular "garden of love" type is no less enclosed, and often a little larger.

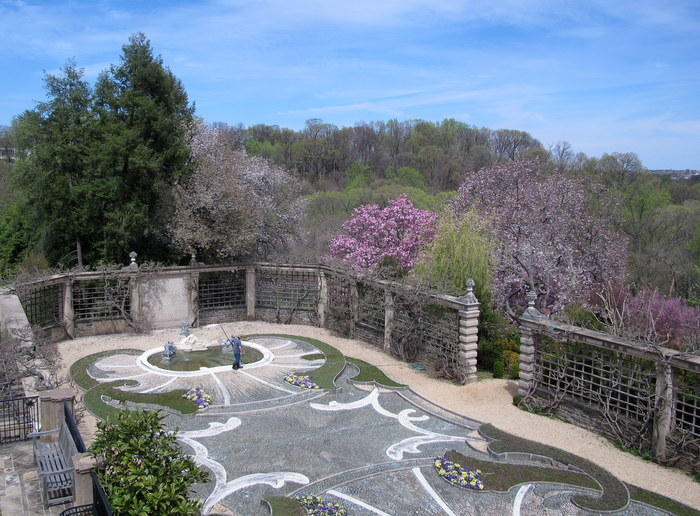
Dumbarton Oaks, Washington DC, the "Pebble Garden" in April

=== Early Modern ===
Italian Renaissance gardens, often on hilly sites with many terraces, called a smallish secluded garden area a giardino segreto ("secret garden"), a term often found in other languages. In steep Italian gardens they often included the borrowed scenery of a view over the surrounding landscape.

In the French formal garden of the 17th and 18th centuries, when the garden aspired to reach into the surrounding landscape, much of the space of the further garden away from the house was occupied with bosquets, dense artificial woodland divided into geometric compartments surrounded by high hedges, in large gardens like the Gardens of Versailles, as much as 20 feet high. Between and within these compartments paths took the visitor to cabinets or garden rooms, the word "cabinet" then meaning a room in both French and English, roughly equivalent to the modern "study" or "home office". Other names were salles vertes and salles de verdure ("green rooms" or "rooms of greenery"). These cabinets usually centred on some feature of interest, such as a statue, fountain, tree or piece of topiary. The English equivalent, the wilderness, had similar features.

In the gardens of Versailles, designed to be unsurpassable, the bosquet areas centred on a large garden room containing either a large sculptural fountain or some other feature such as a cascade, garden amphitheatre, or colonnade. The bosquets are named after these features. The leading French textbook of the period, La Théorie et la pratique du jardinage, by Dezallier d'Argenville (1709) illustrates plans for more modest but still complicated "Cabinets et Salons pour des bosquets" with benches and central features of fountains, small trees, or topiary, and between one and four ways in. d'Argenville shows all the entries as straight walks, but the English gardens illustrated by Jan Kip around 1705–1720 often show curving paths leading to the rooms inside the "quarters" of a wilderness, which would make the occupants invisible until a new person was very close; an example is Castle Howard.

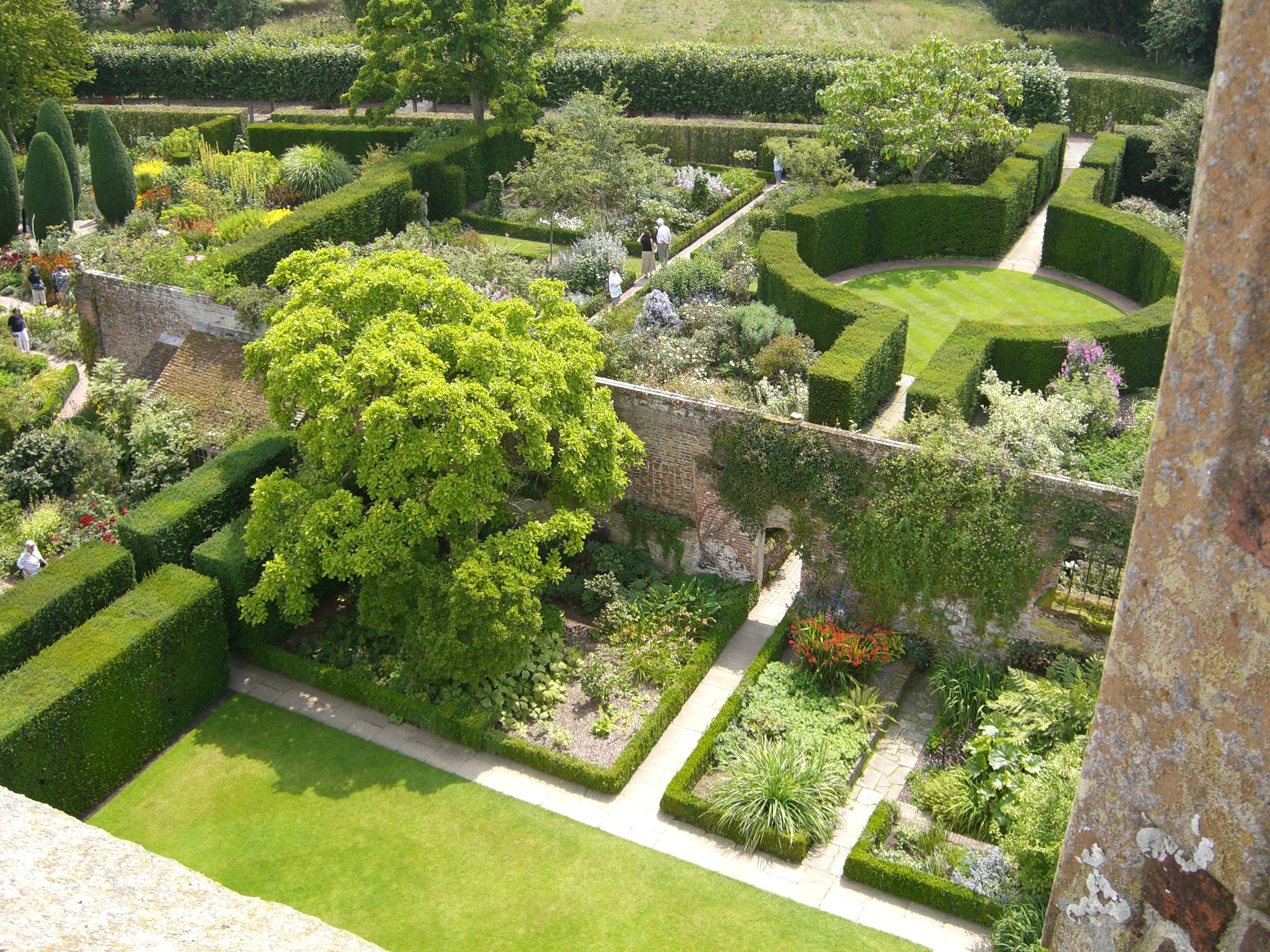
The 20th-century garden at Sissinghurst Castle is arranged as a series of garden rooms.

In English Baroque gardens, as well as garden rooms in wildernesses, there was a fashion for sheltered flower gardens in a style that was believed (rightly or wrongly) to be Dutch.

=== 20th century ===
In the late 19th and early 20th centuries there was an increase in the use of garden rooms, part of a reaction to grand flowing Victorian styles, and an interest in traditional English cottage garden style. After World War I, influential new English gardens laid out as a series of compartments included Sissinghurst Castle Garden, Hidcote, and Tintinhull (from 1933, by Phyllis Reiss). Sissinghurst was mostly planted in the 1930s, except for what is perhaps the most famous of the "rooms", the White Garden, planted in 1949–50, though planned before World War II. Much of the area of the garden had been a larger country house that was mostly demolished, and some walls remained at a height useful for garden divisions. Vita Sackville-West, with her husband Harold Nicolson the designer of her garden, described the spaces as "a series of privacies...all a series of escapes from the world, giving the impression of cumulative escape".

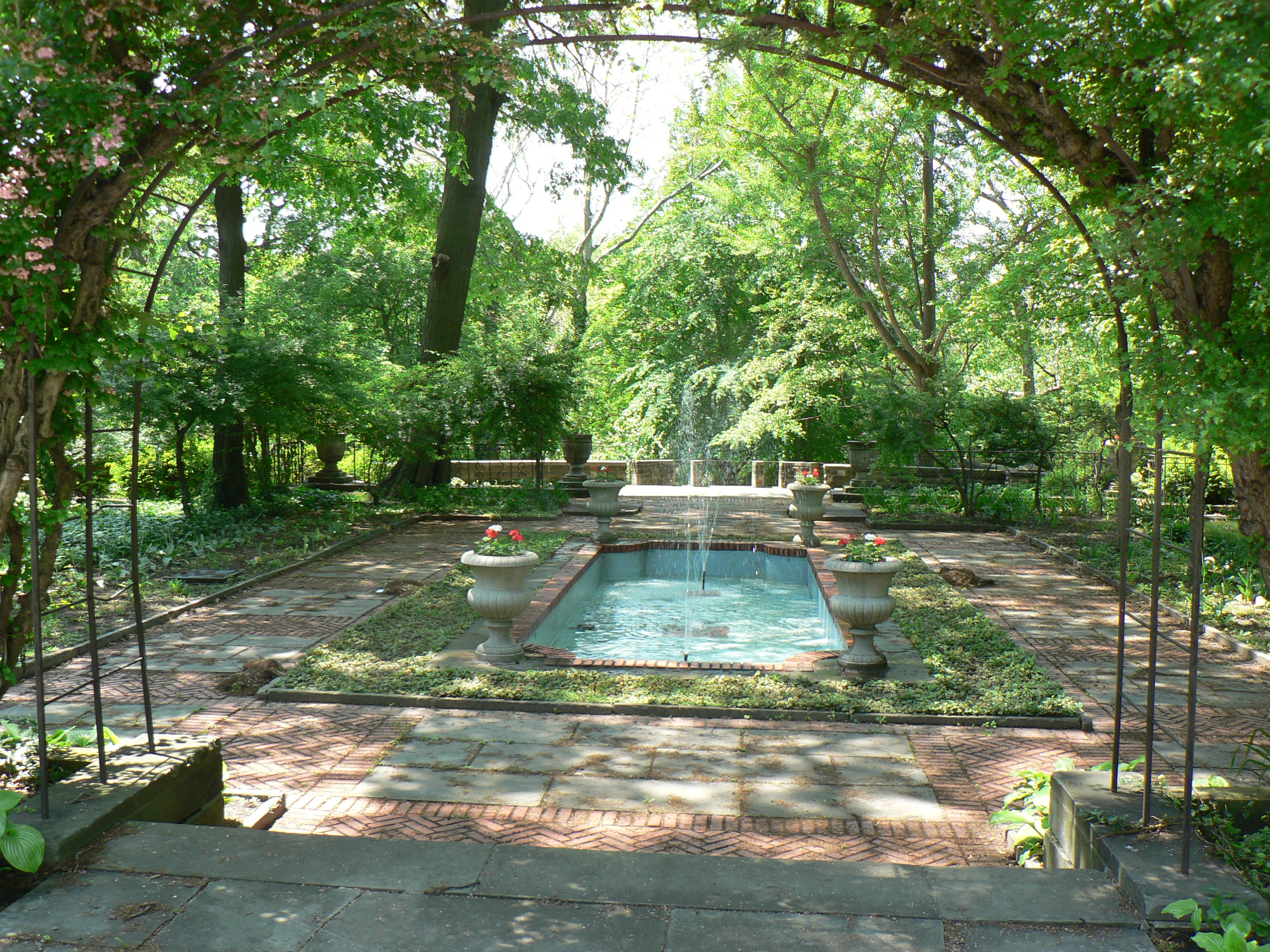
"Hungarian Garden" in the Cleveland Cultural Gardens, Ohio

Dumbarton Oaks in Washington DC, designed by Beatrix Farrand from 1922 onwards, is a larger garden (27 acres) laid out "as a series of outdoor rooms". Like Sissinghurst, the garden of Ninfa in Central Italy partly uses ruins to structure garden spaces, in this case those of an entire village.
