= Pleasure garden =

Garden that is open to the public for recreation and entertainment

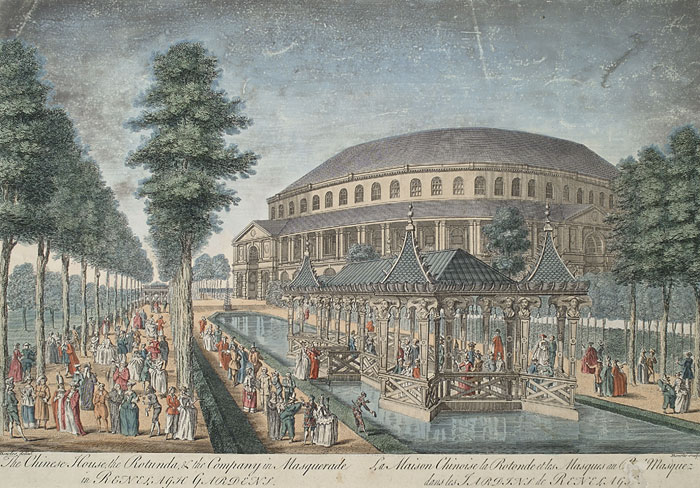
An 18th-century print showing the exterior of the Rotunda at Ranelagh Gardens and part of the grounds

A pleasure garden is a park or garden that is open to the public for recreation and entertainment. Pleasure gardens differ from other public gardens by serving as venues for entertainment, variously featuring such attractions as concert halls, bandstands, amusement rides, zoos, and menageries.

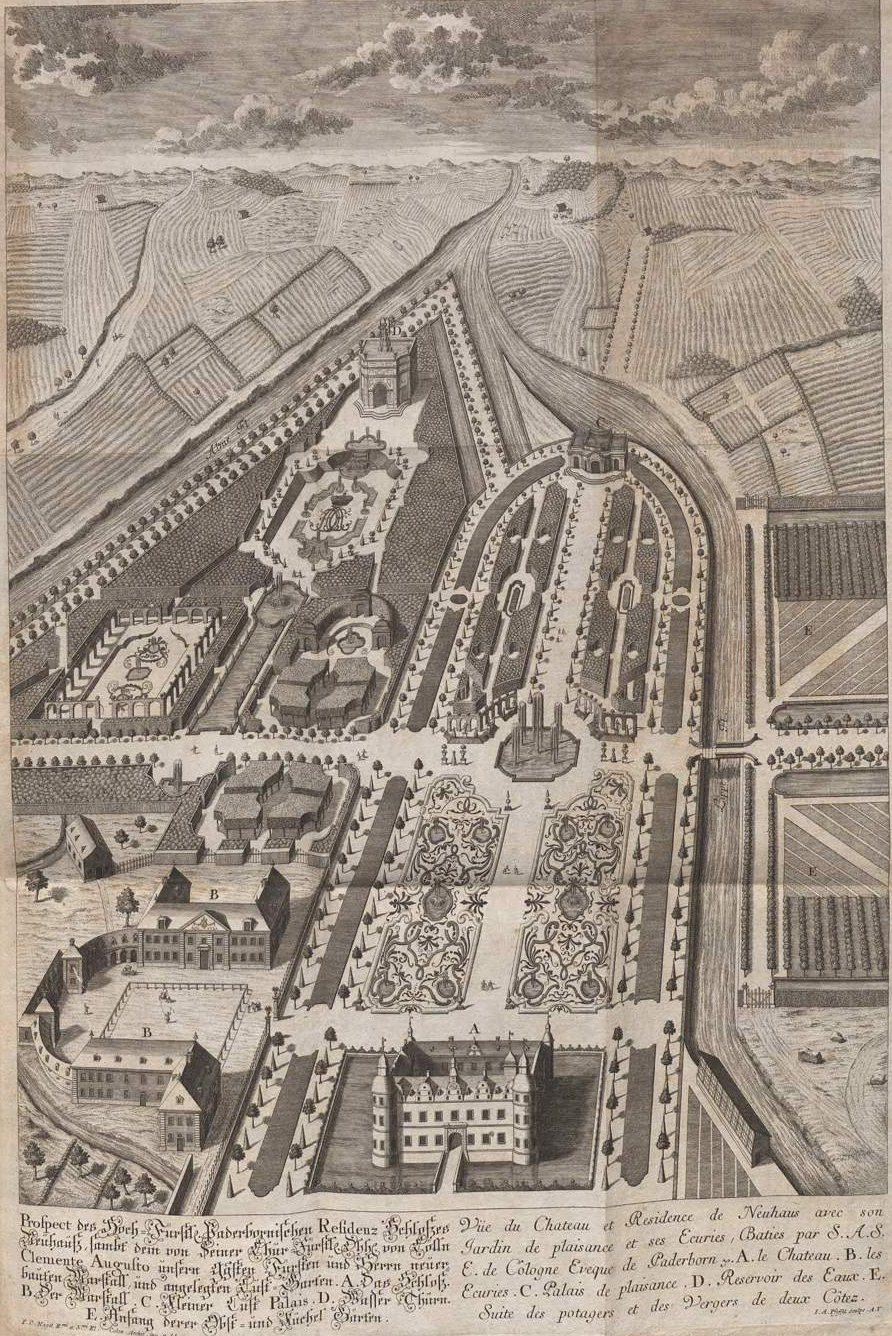
Paderborn Castle, Germany, in 1736, with its jardins de plaisance, as well as the kitchen gardens ("E") at right.

Historically a "pleasure garden" or pleasure ground meant private flower gardens, shrub gardens or formal wooded areas such as bosquets, that were planted for enjoyment, with ornamental plants and neat paths for walking. These were distinguished from the areas in a large garden planted as lawns or a landscaped park, or the "useful" areas of the kitchen garden and woodland. Pleasure gardens provided a cool and refreshing refuge from the summer heat. The Mediterranean gardens were also maintained in the winter season, with winter rain allowing for the upkeep of rose and almond trees in northern Italy. This made the gardens a welcome retreat throughout the year.

The two meanings of the term, as the ornamental parts of a garden, and as a commercial place of entertainment, coexisted in English from at least the 17th century.

== History ==
=== Ancient times ===
The depiction of entertainment in nature has been documented as far back as 1500 BC, with depictions of garden scenes with guests entertained by musicians and dancing girls. In ancient Rome, the landscaped Gardens of Sallust (Horti Sallustiani) were developed as a private garden by the historian Sallust. The gardens were acquired by the Roman Emperor Tiberius for public use. Containing many pavilions, a temple to Venus, and monumental sculptures, the gardens were open to the public for centuries.

A paradeisos was a playground for the Persian nobility, combining parklands, orchards and hunting grounds. In 321 BC the Partition of Triparadisus was signed at Triparadisus in Syria, a vast pleasure grounds complex in Syria.

Formal, extravagant pleasure gardens came to Roman Britain in the 1st century AD, such as can now be seen at Fishbourne Roman Palace. Such gardens were typically decorated with statues, columns, fountains and frescoed walls, as well as decorative stonework. They would likely have been used for hosting and entertaining Roman-born officials and merchants, as well as the native, Romanized British upper classes.

=== British early modern and Victorian times ===
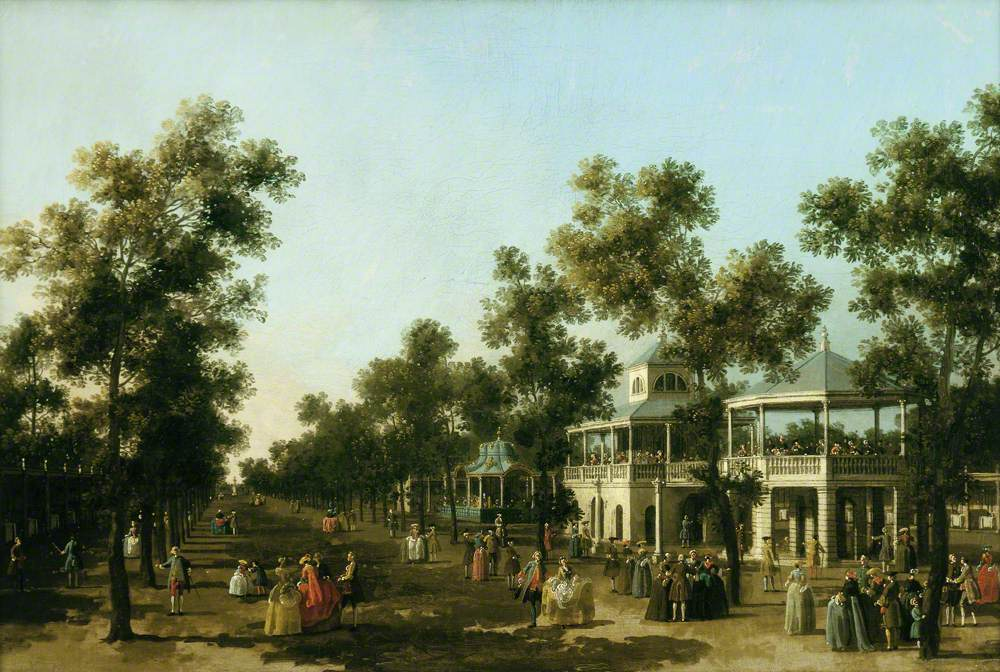
The Grand Walk, Vauxhall Gardens by Canaletto, 1751.

Public pleasure gardens were opened in London from the later 17th century; many had previously been parts of large private gardens, so the garden layout already existed. Usually entrance required payment. English nobles were increasingly able to build undefended, hospitable homes equipped with pleasure gardens displaying exotic fauna introduced from the Americas and Indies. Marylebone Gardens was visited by Samuel Pepys on 7 May 1668: "And we abroad to Marrowbone, and there walked in the garden, the first time I ever was there, and a pretty place it is". Cuper's Gardens, on the southern bank of the River Thames, opened in the 1680s. These both expanded their areas greatly in the 18th century, the heyday of the pleasure garden.

New openings in the 18th and 19th centuries in London included Cremorne Gardens, Ranelagh Gardens, Royal Surrey Gardens, Vauxhall Gardens and Royal Flora Gardens. Other cities, in England and abroad, acquired their own, such as Holte Bridgman's Apollo Gardens in Birmingham (1740s) and Leeds Royal Park in 1858. Most modern gardens would have been called "pleasure gardens", especially in the 17th and 18th centuries.

Many contained large concert halls, or hosted promenade concerts; some lesser discussed pleasure gardens were home to haberdasheries and harems. A smaller version of a pleasure garden is a tea garden, where visitors may drink tea and stroll.

The rise of the suburban, private garden in the 20th century coincided with and influenced the decline of the public pleasure garden.

== See also ==
- List of garden types
