= Louis Emanuel =

English composer, conductor and bandmaster

Louis Emanuel (also Louis Alexander Emanuel or L. A. Emanuel) (1819–1889) was an English composer, conductor and bandmaster, born in Plymouth. He was music director at Vauxhall Gardens, London, from 1845. He was Jewish.

His compositions include "The Desert", "What Does Little Birdie Say?", "The Charm", "My Switzer Love Is Brave" and "The Syren and Friar".
