= Royal Flora Gardens =

Former pleasure gardens

Coordinates: 51°28′43″N 0°06′03″W

The Royal Flora Gardens (later known as the New Vauxhall Gardens) were short-lived popular pleasure gardens at Wyndham Road in Camberwell (then in Surrey but now in London) from 1849 to 1864.

== Origins ==
The manor of Camberwell was acquired by Edmund Bowyer in 1583; his descendants owned land within the parish that became known as the Bowyer Estate. Bowyer Lane still exists (as of 2022) in Camberwell; it previously continued on what became Wyndham Road, running between Old and New Camberwell Roads. As late as the 1780s the area consisted of open meadows, arable farmland and paddocks, with Bowyer Lane being a quiet country lane. The earliest recorded nurseryman was the florist Thomas Davey; he moved from Camberwell to Chelsea in 1800. Nevertheless, by the early 19th century, the Wyndham Road area had become notoriously dissolute. The body of a man who had been executed for horse-stealing was for some time exhibited by a family living on Wyndham Road at a shilling a time until brought to an end by the intervention of the Curate of St Giles' Church, Camberwell, the Rev Henry Woodcock Hyde (curate 1817–1824). Around the time of this incident (1818), the area was described in a report by a school as being "proverbial for its depravity". The murderer James Greenacre lived in the area in 1836, the year of the murder for which he was executed.

A patch of land on the north of Wyndham Road remained unbuilt upon and, in 1849, was opened, with much fanfare, as the Royal Flora Gardens.

== Ownership and management ==
The initial proprietor of the Royal Flora Gardens was T.P. Hemmings (who also kept a house of ill-fame on Leicester Square). The gardens had closed as part of bankruptcy proceedings in 1850, but were proposed to be reopened for the benefit of creditors. However, if his offer was rejected, James Ellis of the Cremorne Gardens in Chelsea would come forward with an offer to re-open. Hemmings had unsecured debts of £2,000, for which there were no assets. In 1851 Ellis took over management of the gardens.

By 1856 the proprietors were Courtney Stacey and Tom Stowell, and by 1858 the ownership of the gardens was held by a Mr Helwell. In 1859 the Vauxhall Pleasure Gardens closed, and the management of the Flora Gardens capitalised on this by rebranding them as the New Vauxhall Gardens.

== Attractions ==
The gardens were capable of absorbing 20,000 visitors at a time; the ‘monstre marquee’ was 100 by 40 ft in size. The landscaped gardens were decorated with classical sculpture and artificial ruins, including floral parterres with rare exotics, hothouses with exotic flowers, summer houses, caged foreign and native birds, monkeys, fountains and waterfalls. As late as 1862 the gardens were advertising for a gardener who understood the propagating of vines. Entry was sixpence; the low admission price made up for by the presence of a bar and a 'Grand Parisian Bazaar'.

Under Ellis's management from 1851, the focus moved from the gardens themselves to evening entertainments of tethered balloon flights, Venetian-style carnivals, concerts, firework displays, and Mr W Kite, who drove around the gardens in a chariot drawn by a team of cats. Ellis also promoted attractions including a ballet d'action arranged by J.W. Collier entitled The Wood Nymphs, or The Enchanted Dell, Concert Monstre and Bal al Fresco, Ascent and Descent of Madame Genieve, the first tightrope dancer in the world, brilliant illuminations and grant pyrotechnic display, for which the admission was sixpence. In an advertisement for sale of the lease in 1852, it was described as "The grounds have been formed and laid out at an expense of several thousand pounds, and the erections include a theatre, dancing saloon, rifle-gallery, refreshment-rooms, conservatories, grottos, lake with waterfalls and fountains, etc; the whole so tastefully arranged as to render this property a worthy rival to the celebrated Vauxhall Gardens."

Apart from the notoriety of the surrounding area, the gardens themselves had a somewhat shady reputation. In 1850 Mary Ann Caston sued James Miller for support for his illegitimate child; the couple had met at the Flora Gardens, and, on their way home, Miller had seduced Caston, with promises of marriage. The Era newspaper reported the court proceedings with the headline "Maidens, Beware of the Flora!". In 1858 the gardens briefly closed, with the presence of a large number of prostitutes adding to their poor reputation.

== Decline and closure ==
Despite the renaming as the New Vauxhall Gardens, enthusiasm for pleasure gardens had started to wane, and the gardens were sold in 1861 to Henry King and John David Wale (1818-1864), but closed permanently in 1863. On 16 August 1864 a grand gala was held as a farewell to the gardens, for the benefit of the proprietor William Walter Wale (1816-1872), the brother of the earlier co-owner. Later in 1864 the site was built out in closely packed terraces, which soon became slums. As late as 1892 Charles Booth described the area as standing alone in an otherwise well-to-do district, "acting as a moral cesspool".

== Legacy ==
The redeveloped site included a Watney Combe & Reid pub, The Warrior, and the Wyndham Road Mission. The pub survived until the early 1970s, while the Mission only existed from 1876 to 1878 when it was replaced by the nearby St Michael and All Angels Church, Camberwell. In the early 1970s the site was redeveloped, with a new school, Archbishop Michael Ramsey School (later St Michael's Academy), and a new St Michael and All Angels Church, the latter designed by the diocesan architect, Thomas Ford. in turn, these buildings were all replaced in 2014 by a new school, ARK All Saints Academy, and a new St Michael and All Angels church, and a special education school, Highshore School, re-located from Highshore Road, Peckham. The 2014 church was designed by Peter Mayhew of Allford Hall Monaghan Morris, in a similar style to Tadao Ando's Church of the Light in Japan.

Apart from a brief reference in Warwick Wroth's 1907 study Cremorne and the Later London Pleasure Gardens, the Royal Flora Gardens were forgotten until Jonathan Gregson wrote an article about them for the Camberwell Society's quarterly journal in 2017.
