= Vauxhall Gardens =

Public park in London, England

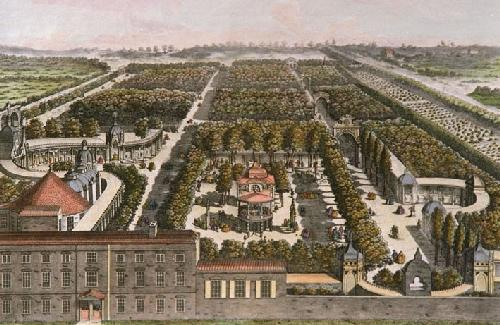
- A prospect of Vauxhall Gardens in 1751
- Interactive map of Vauxhall Gardens
- Location: London, SE11; England
- Coordinates: 51°29′15″N 0°07′15″W
- Open: All year
- Public transit: Vauxhall

Vauxhall Gardens /ˈvɒksɔːl/ is a public park in Kennington in the London Borough of Lambeth, England, on the south bank of the River Thames.

Originally known as New Spring Gardens, it is believed to have opened before the Restoration of 1660, being mentioned by Samuel Pepys in 1662. From 1785 to 1859, the site was known as Vauxhall, a pleasure garden and one of the leading venues for public entertainment in London from the mid-17th century to the mid-19th century. The Gardens consisted of several acres of trees and shrubs with attractive walks. Initially entrance was free, with food and drink being sold to support the venture.

The pleasure grounds was accessed by boats on the Thames until the erection of Vauxhall Bridge in the 1810s. The area was absorbed into the metropolis as the city expanded in the early to mid-19th century.

The site became Vauxhall Gardens in 1785 and admission was charged for its attractions. The Gardens drew enormous crowds, with its paths being noted for romantic assignations. Tightrope walkers, hot-air balloon ascents, concerts and fireworks provided entertainment. The rococo "Turkish tent" became one of the Gardens' structures, the interior of the Rotunda became one of Vauxhall's most viewed attractions, and the chinoiserie style was a feature of several buildings. A statue depicting George Frideric Handel in the Gardens later found its way to Westminster Abbey. In 1817, the Battle of Waterloo was re-enacted, with 1,000 soldiers participating.

It closed in 1840 after its owners became bankrupt, but re-opened in 1841. It changed hands in 1842, and was permanently closed in 1859. The land was redeveloped in the following decades, but slum clearance in the late 20th century saw part of the original site open up as a public park. This was initially called Spring Gardens and was renamed in 2012 as Vauxhall Pleasure Gardens. It is managed as a public park by the London Borough of Lambeth.

Vauxhall Gardens is depicted in a tile motif at Vauxhall tube station by George Smith.

== Cultural significance ==
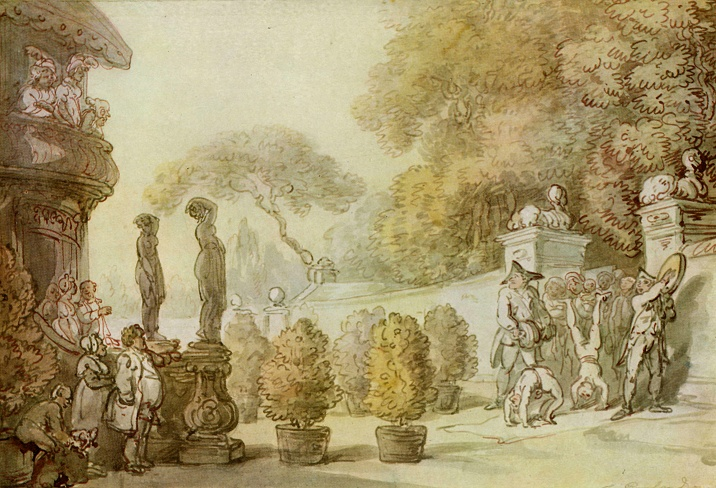
Entrance to Vauxhall Gardens by Thomas Rowlandson

Eminent 18th-century scholar John Barrell, writing in the Times Literary Supplement, brings out Vauxhall's significance. "Vauxhall pleasure gardens, on the south bank of the Thames, entertained Londoners and visitors to London for 200 years. From 1729, under the management of Jonathan Tyers, property developer, impresario, patron of the arts, the gardens grew into an extraordinary business, a cradle of modern painting and architecture, and ... music .... A pioneer of mass entertainment, Tyers had to become also a pioneer of mass catering, of outdoor lighting, of advertising, and of all the logistics involved in running one of the most complex and profitable business ventures of the eighteenth century in Britain." References to Vauxhall are, for 150 years, as ubiquitous as references to "Broadway" later would be. For example, an old Polish word for a pleasure garden (foksal) and the name of Foksal Street in Warsaw are Polonized versions of Vauxhall. In Russia, vokzal (вокзал) has become synonymous with railway stations (and sometimes other transportation hubs) due to the preponderance of such "entertainment establishments" as the Vauxhall near train stations in the 18th and 19th centuries.

== History ==
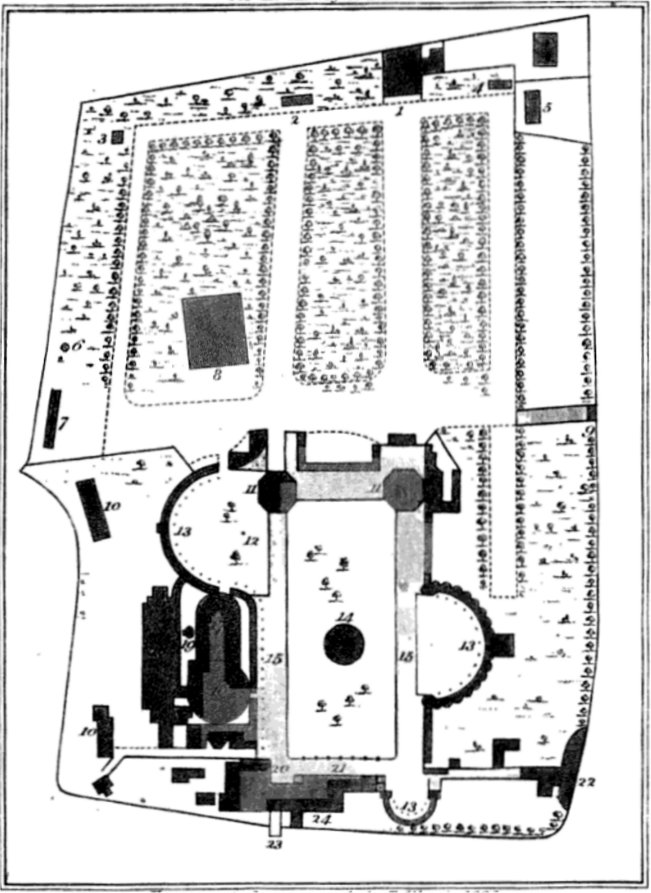
Plan of Vauxhall Gardens, 1826

The Gardens are believed to have opened just before the Restoration of 1660, on property formerly owned by Jane Fauxe, or Vaux, a widow, in 1615. Whereas John Nichols in his History of Lambeth Parish conjectures that she was the widow of Guy Fawkes, executed in 1606, John Timbs in his 1867 Curiosities of London states for a fact that there was no such connection, and that the Vaux name derives from one Falkes de Breauté, a mercenary working for King John who acquired the land by marriage. Jane is stated to be the widow of John, a vintner. Perhaps the earliest record is Samuel Pepys' description of a visit he made to the New Spring Gardens on 29 May 1662. The then name distinguished the gardens from the Old Spring Gardens at Charing Cross; however Pepys implies that there were both Old and New Spring Gardens at Vauxhall; and indeed Spring Gardens appears to have been a longstanding appellation for a variety of entertainment enterprises.

The Gardens consisted of several acres laid out with walks. Initially admission was free, the proprietors making money by selling food and drink. John Evelyn described "the New Spring Garden at Lambeth" as a "very pretty contrived plantation" in 1661. John Aubrey, in his Antiquities of Surrey gives the following account:

At Vauxhall, Sir Samuel Morland built a fine room, anno 1667, the inside all of looking-glass, and fountains very pleasant to behold, which is much visited by strangers: it stands in the middle of the garden, covered with Cornish slate, on the point of which he placed a punchinello, very well carved, which held a dial, but the winds have demolished it.

A plan of 1681 shows the circular central feature planted with trees and shrubs, and the formal allées that were to remain a feature as long as the Gardens lasted.

Sir John Hawkins, in his General History of Music (1776), says:

The house seems to have been rebuilt since the time that Sir Samuel Morland dwelt in it. About the year 1730, Mr. Jonathan Tyers became the occupier of it, and, there being a large garden belonging to it, planted with a great number of stately trees, and laid out in shady walks, it obtained the name of Spring Gardens; and the house being converted into a tavern, or place of entertainment, was much frequented by the votaries of pleasure. Mr. Tyers opened it with an advertisement of a Ridotto al Fresco, a term which the people of this country had till that time been strangers to. These entertainments were repeated in the course of the summer, and numbers resorted to partake of them. This encouraged the proprietor to make his garden a place of musical entertainment, for every evening during the summer season. To this end he was at great expense in decorating the gardens with paintings; he engaged a band of excellent musicians; he issued silver tickets at one guinea each for admission, and receiving great encouragement, he set up an organ in the orchestra, and, in a conspicuous part of the garden, erected a fine statue of Mr. Handel.

The 'supposed' last night of the gardens was on 5 September 1839 when it attracted 1089 people. Vauxhall was sold at auction on 9 September 1841 for £20,000, following bankruptcy of the owners, after which it re-opened, but it was permanently closed in 1859, and most of the land sold for building purposes.

== The Spring Gardens and the Rococo in England ==
The Spring Gardens were the most prominent vehicle in England for the public display of the new Rococo style. The earliest pictorial representation of Tyers' Spring Gardens, Vauxhall, is the "Vauxhall fan" (1736), an etching printed in blue designed to be pasted to a fan; it shows the earliest groups of pavilions, in a sober classical taste, but the interiors of the supper boxes were painted by members of Hogarth's St. Martin's Lane Academy, prominent among them Francis Hayman. Hayman provided most of the subjects, which were rapidly executed by students and assistants; Hubert Gravelot provided designs for two others, and Hogarth's designs were pressed into service in hastily dashed-off copies that filled the back of every box. At a certain hour, all the paintings were let down at once, to offer some security to the companies at supper and a suitable backdrop, one observer thought, for the live beauties of London. Frederick, Prince of Wales, who had come to England with his father George II in 1728 and who was a prominent patron of the Rococo, took sufficient interest in the Gardens to have his own pavilion built from the very first.

The first fully Rococo structure erected at the Spring Gardens, Vauxhall, was the "Turkish Tent" that was still a novelty in 1744; "this fantastic structure introduced that element of frivolous impermanence which became so characteristic of Vauxhall," David Coke has remarked. In the course of the 1740s it was joined by other examples of Rococo chinoiserie and above all by the Rotunda, with the most-viewed Rococo interior decoration in England, designed by George Michael Moser, another member of the St. Martin's Lane Academy; the ornaments were "Executed by French and Italians" George Vertue noted.

== The experience ==
Enormous crowds could be accommodated at Spring Gardens, Vauxhall. In 1749 a rehearsal of Handel's Music for the Royal Fireworks attracted an audience of 12,000, and in 1786 a fancy-dress jubilee to celebrate the proprietor's long ownership was thronged with 61,000 revellers. Many of the best known musicians and singers of the day performed at the Gardens, for example Sophia Baddeley. In 1732, their fashionable status was confirmed by a fancy dress ball attended by Frederick, Prince of Wales. At that time access from the West End was by water, but the opening of Westminster Bridge in the 1740s made access easier though less charming.

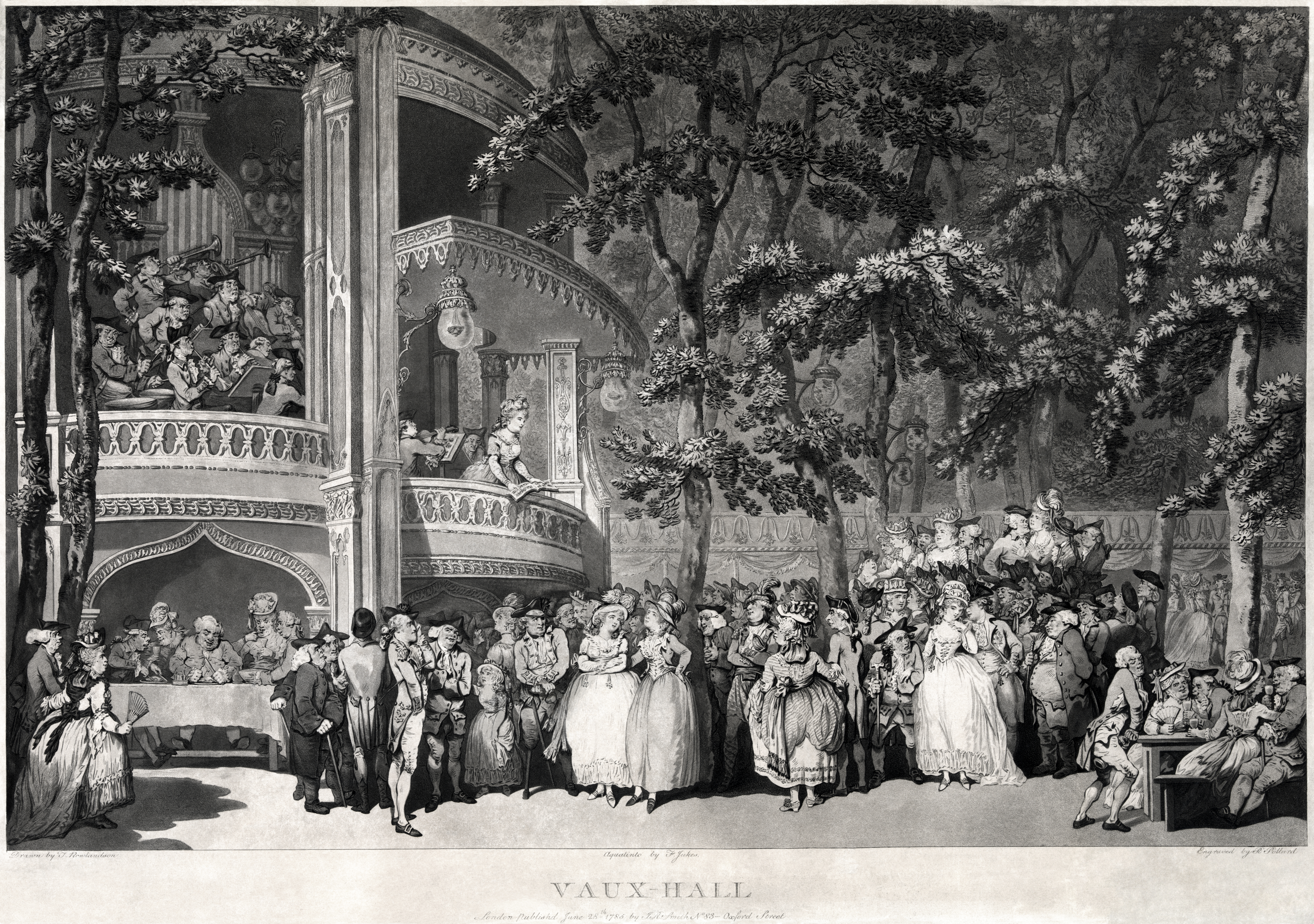
An entertainment in Vauxhall Gardens in about 1779, by Thomas Rowlandson. The two women in the centre are Georgiana, Duchess of Devonshire and her sister Lady Duncannon. The man seated at the table on the left is Samuel Johnson, with James Boswell to his left and Oliver Goldsmith to his right. To the right the actress and author Mary Darby Robinson stands next to the Prince of Wales, later George IV

The main walks were lit at night by thousands of lamps. Over time more features and eyecatchers were added: additional supper boxes, a music room, a Chinese pavilion, a gothic orchestra that accommodated fifty musicians, and ruins, arches, statues and a cascade. An admission charge was introduced from the beginning and later James Boswell wrote:

Vauxhall Gardens is peculiarly adapted to the taste of the English nation; there being a mixture of curious show, — gay exhibition, musick, vocal and instrumental, not too refined for the general ear; — for all of which only a shilling is paid; and, though last, not least, good eating and drinking for those who choose to purchase that regale.

The unlighted 'dark walks' or 'close walks', examples of what was called a wilderness, were known as a place for amorous adventures. Thomas Brown in "Works Serious and Comical in Prose and Verse" (1760) says:

The ladies that have an inclination to be private, take delight in the close walks of Spring-Gardens, where both sexes meet, and mutually serve one another as guides to lose their way; and the windings and turnings in the little wildernesses are so intricate, that the most experienced mothers have often lost themselves in looking for their daughters."

A great part of the entertainment was offered by the well-dressed company itself. Pauses between pieces of music were intentionally long enough to give the crowd time to circulate the Gardens anew. M. Grosely, in his Tour to London (1772) says, relating to Ranelagh Gardens and Vauxhall:

These entertainments, which begin in the month of May, are continued every night. They bring together persons of all ranks and conditions; and amongst these, a considerable number of females, whose charms want only that cheerful air, which is the flower and quintessence of beauty. These places serve equally as a rendezvous either for business or intrigue. They form, as it were, private coteries; there you see fathers and mothers, with their children, enjoying domestic happiness in the midst of public diversions. The English assert, that such entertainments as these can never subsist in France, on account of the levity of the people. Certain it is, that those of Vauxhall and Ranelagh, which are guarded only by outward decency, are conducted without tumult and disorder, which often disturb the public diversions of France. I do not know whether the English are gainers thereby; the joy which they seem in search of at those places does not beam through their countenances; they look as grave at Vauxhall and Ranelagh as at the Bank, at church, or a private club. All persons there seem to say, what a young English nobleman said to his governor, Am I as joyous as I should be?

The new name Vauxhall Gardens, long in popular use, was made official in 1785. After Boswell's time the admission charge rose steadily: to two shillings in 1792, three-and-sixpence in the early 19th century, and 4/6 in the 1820s. Season tickets were also sold. Entertainment in this period included hot-air balloon ascents, fireworks, and tightrope walkers. In 1813 there was a fête to celebrate victory at the Battle of Vitoria, and in 1827 the Battle of Waterloo was re-enacted by 1,000 soldiers.

The contributor to the Edinburgh Encyclopedia (1830 edition) comments that:

the garden's great attraction arises from their being splendidly illuminated at night with about 15,000 glass lamps. These being tastefully hung among the trees, which line the walks, produce an impression similar to that which is called up on reading some of the stories in the Arabian Nights Entertainments. On some occasions there have been upwards of 19,000 persons in them, and this immense concourse, most of whom are well dressed, seen in connection with the illuminated walks, add not a little to the brilliant and astonishing effect of the whole scene.

Charles Dickens wrote of a daylight visit to Vauxhall Gardens, in Sketches by Boz, published in 1836:

We paid our shilling at the gate, and then we saw for the first time, that the entrance, if there had been any magic about it at all, was now decidedly disenchanted, being, in fact, nothing more nor less than a combination of very roughly-painted boards and sawdust. We glanced at the orchestra and supper-room as we hurried past—we just recognised them, and that was all. We bent our steps to the firework-ground; there, at least, we should not be disappointed. We reached it, and stood rooted to the spot with mortification and astonishment. That the Moorish tower—that wooden shed with a door in the centre, and daubs of crimson and yellow all round, like a gigantic watch-case! That the place where night after night we had beheld the undaunted Mr. Blackmore make his terrific ascent, surrounded by flames of fire, and peals of artillery, and where the white garments of Madame Somebody (we forget even her name now), who nobly devoted her life to the manufacture of fireworks, had so often been seen fluttering in the wind, as she called up a red, blue, or party-coloured light to illumine her temple!

The Gardens feature in a number of other works of literature. They are the scene of a brief but pivotal turning point in the fortunes of anti-heroine Becky Sharp in Thackeray's 19th-century novel Vanity Fair, as well as a setting in his novel Pendennis. Thomas Hardy sets scenes in his The Dynasts in the Gardens. In Cecilia by Frances Burney the Gardens are where the character Mr Harrell commits suicide.

The Gardens passed through several hands. In 1840, the owners went bankrupt and the Gardens closed. They were revived the following year, and again in 1842 under new management, but in 1859 they closed for good. After the closure of the gardens, the owners of the Royal Flora Gardens in Camberwell renamed their gardens the New Vauxhall Gardens, but these gardens, in turn, closed in 1864.

== Present day ==
Vauxhall Pleasure Gardens today is an inner-city park. After its closure in the 19th century the land was developed but by the 1970s slum clearance reopened part of the site. The park opened in 1976 and was originally called Spring Gardens, but was re-named Vauxhall Pleasure Gardens in 2012.

There is Vauxhall City Farm as well as deciduous trees and allotments. Street names in the location refer back to the historical Vauxhall Gardens – such as Jonathan Street and Tyers Street.

== See also ==
- Ranelagh Gardens – Vauxhall Gardens' rival, which operated from 1742 to 1803.
- Cremorne Gardens – 19th-century public gardens in Chelsea.
- Cuper's Gardens – 18th-century tea garden in Lambeth.
- Charles Green – record-making balloonist in the "Royal Vauxhall" 1836
- Marylebone Gardens – musical gardens in Marylebone, 1738–1781.
- Vauxhall Gardens (Birmingham), later "Royal Vauxhall Gardens", operated circa 1758–1853, and named after the London venue.
- Tivoli Gardens, Copenhagen, which were originally called Tivoli and Vauxhall Gardens.
- John Hebden, principal cellist and bassoonist, 1745
- James Hook, organist and composer at Vauxhall Gardens, 1773–1820.
- Louis Emanuel, music director of Vauxhall Gardens from 1845.
- William Thomas Moncrieff, managed Vauxhall Gardens in 1827.
- Ching Lau Lauro, performed at Vauxhall Gardens in 1827, 1828 and 1834.

== Notes and references ==
=== Sources ===
- David Coke, "Vauxhall Gardens", Rococo: Art and Design in Hogarth's England (London: Victoria and Albert Museum) 1984:75–81. ISBN 978-0-86294-046-1
- Ilias Chrissochoidis, "'hee-haw ... llelujah': Handel among the Vauxhall Asses (1732)", Eighteenth-Century Music 7/2 (September 2010), 221–262.
