= Dezallier d'Argenville =

French naturalist and writer (1680–1765)

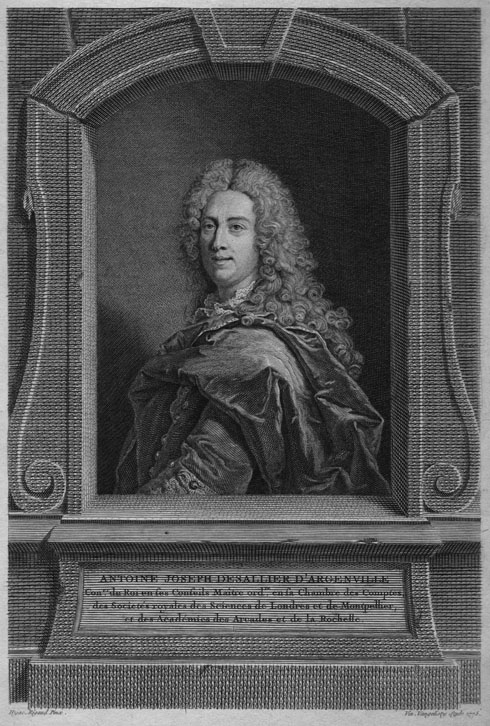
Antoine-Joseph Dezallier d'Argenville.

The family of Dezallier d'Argenville produced two writers and connoisseurs, father and son, in the course of the 18th century. The father, Antoine-Joseph Dezallier d'Argenville (1680–1765) is now best known for writing the fullest French treatise on the French formal garden style of his lifetime, as well as books on natural history, and as a significant collector of old master prints.

His son, Antoine-Nicolas Dezallier d'Argenville (1723–1796), wrote successful guides to Paris and its monuments, as well as books on natural history, a biographical collection on architects and sculptors, and other subjects.

== Antoine-Joseph Dezallier d'Argenville ==
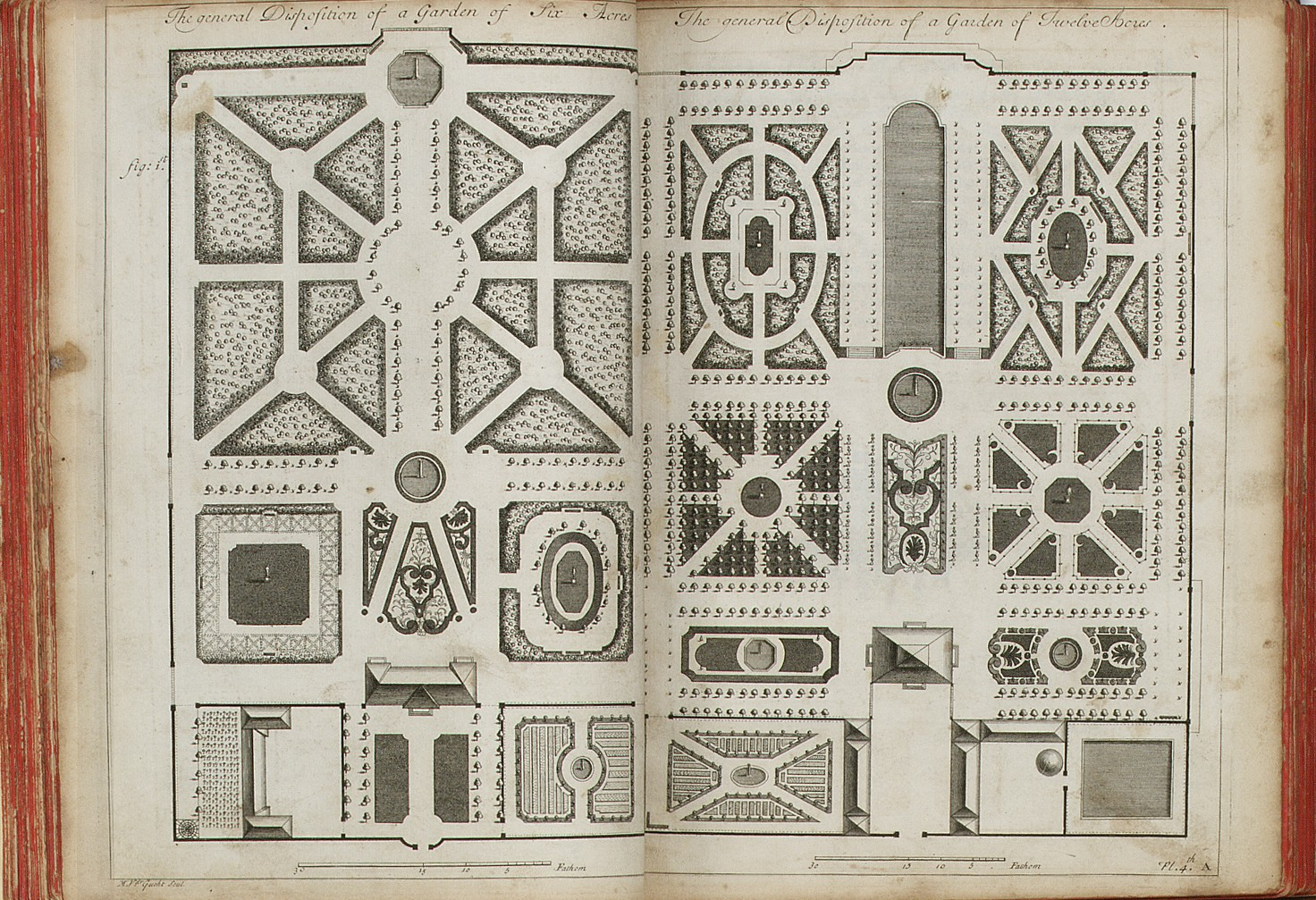
Opening from the 1712 English edition of The Theory and Practice of Gardening - Wherein is Fully Handled all that Relates to Fine Gardens, Commonly called Pleasure-Gardens, as Parterres, Groves, Bowling-Greens &c. Suggested schemes for gardens of 6 (left) and 12 (right) acres.

Antoine-Joseph Dezallier d'Argenville (Paris, 1 July 1680 – 29 November 1765), avocat to the Parlement of Paris and secretary to the king, was a connoisseur of gardening who laid out two for himself and his family, before writing La théorie et la pratique du jardinage (published anonymously, 1709; second edition, 1713), based on his experience and his reading. The majority of the illustrations were by Jean-Baptiste Alexandre Le Blond, who was credited as the author in the third edition, 1722. As the work of a gentleman rather than a gardener, as previous French books on gardening had all been, Dezallier d'Argenville's work was laid out like a treatise of architecture, addressed as much to the architect and the patron as to the practising gardener. As its title suggests, the treatise is composed of two parts: the theoretical principles of the art of fine gardening and its practical applications. The first section considers the principles of siting the maison de plaisance relative to its gardens, techniques of laying out geometric figures in parterres, avenues and formal tree plantations (bosquets), and the planning of garden pavilions and the siting of sculpture, an essential element in the jardin français or French formal garden. The second part applies the principles in earth works, terraces and stairs, and the hydraulics necessary for constructing jeux d'eau: fountains, cascades, pools (bassins) and canals.

His rational principles could adapt formal parterre gardening to the simplified programs available to the upper middle class, which accounts for the immense popularity of his book, which is the central document in the 18th century formal garden in the wake of André Le Nôtre. The work went through thirteen editions in France, where the English mode of landscape design scarcely made itself known before the French Revolution. It was published in a German version (1731) and translated into English by the architect John James, as The Theory and Practice of Gardening (1712, with a 2nd edition in 1728, and a 3rd edition in 1743, when the English landscape garden, might have seemed to make its formal designs passé.) Dezallier d'Argenville's Théorique in its English version introduced the Ha-ha, the invisible fence, to widespread English practice, although Althorp already had one in 1697.

== Dezailler d'Argenville ==
Dezailler d'Argenville was called upon to edit or contribute more than 600 entries in the Encyclopédie of Denis Diderot and Jean le Rond d'Alembert, published in parts from 1751.

Dezallier d'Argenville's interest in natural history resulted in two treatises, on shells and minerals, L'histoire naturelle éclaircie dans deux de ses parties principales, la lithologie et la conchyliologie. (Paris 1742) La Conchyliologie, ou Traité sur la nature des coquillages 1757 etc. The connoisseurship of shells and their most colourful and fantastic form was a gentleman's occupation and a worthy inclusion in a cabinet de curiosités before it became a science under the Linnaean system of classification.

He was elected a Fellow of the Royal Society of London in March 1750.

Beyond his success in the fields of gardening and natural history, Dezallier d'Argenville was a print collector. He organised his extensive collection by subject rather than by school, as outlined in the 'Lettre sur le choix et l'arrangement d'un Cabinet curieux…' that he published in the Mercure de France in 1727. Within the 'Lettre', which takes the form of an article, Dezallier d'Argenville describes 'Three volumes containing the clothing and fashion of the different nations of the world', and a further volume documenting costumes from his native France. The sale of Dezallier's property, which took place on 3 March 1766 following his death in 1765, mentions within these volumes a total of 1,600 costume prints from the time of King Charles II until 1730. It also describes 'good prints by le Clerc, Picart, Hollar, Royn de Hoog and several Chinese drawings. All four volumes are now located at the Bibliothèque de l'Arsenal in Paris.

== Antoine-Nicolas Dezallier d'Argenville ==
His son, Antoine-Nicolas Dezallier d'Argenville (1723–1796), was the anonymous author (M. D***.) of Voyage Pictoresque de Paris; ou Indication de tout ce qu'il y a de plus beau dans cette grande Ville en Peinture, Sculpture, & Architecture, which appeared in Paris in 1749, a connoisseur's guide to the chief artistic and architectural monuments of Paris, with accounts of the leading academic and scientific organisations of the city. At least six further editions appeared before the Revolution (Paris, 1752, 1757, 1765, 1770, 1778, 1780). A Voyage pittoresque des environs de Paris, ou Description des Maisons Royales, Châteaux & autres Lieux de Plaisance, situés à quinze lieues aux environs de cette Ville by the same author appeared in Paris in 1755, a connoiseur's guide to the chief artistic and architectural monuments of the surroundings of Paris in which the author especially paid a tribute to the triumph of gardening. At least one further edition appeared before the Revolution (Paris, 1768, 3rd edition).

Further works were Dénombrement de tous les fossiles de France and L'Oryctologie ou Traité des pierres, des minéraux et autres fossiles.

He compiled also the Vies des Fameux Architectes Depuis la renaissance des Arts in two volumes, 1787, of which the second was devoted to sculptors. An abridged edition (Abrégé de la vie...) was often reprinted. A facsimile was published in Geneva 1972. He also wrote a Dictionnaire du jardinage, relatif à la théorie. et à la pratique de cet art (Paris, 1771) and a Manuel du jardinier ou journal de son travail distribué par mois, (Paris, 1772).
