= Bosquet =

Concept in landscaping

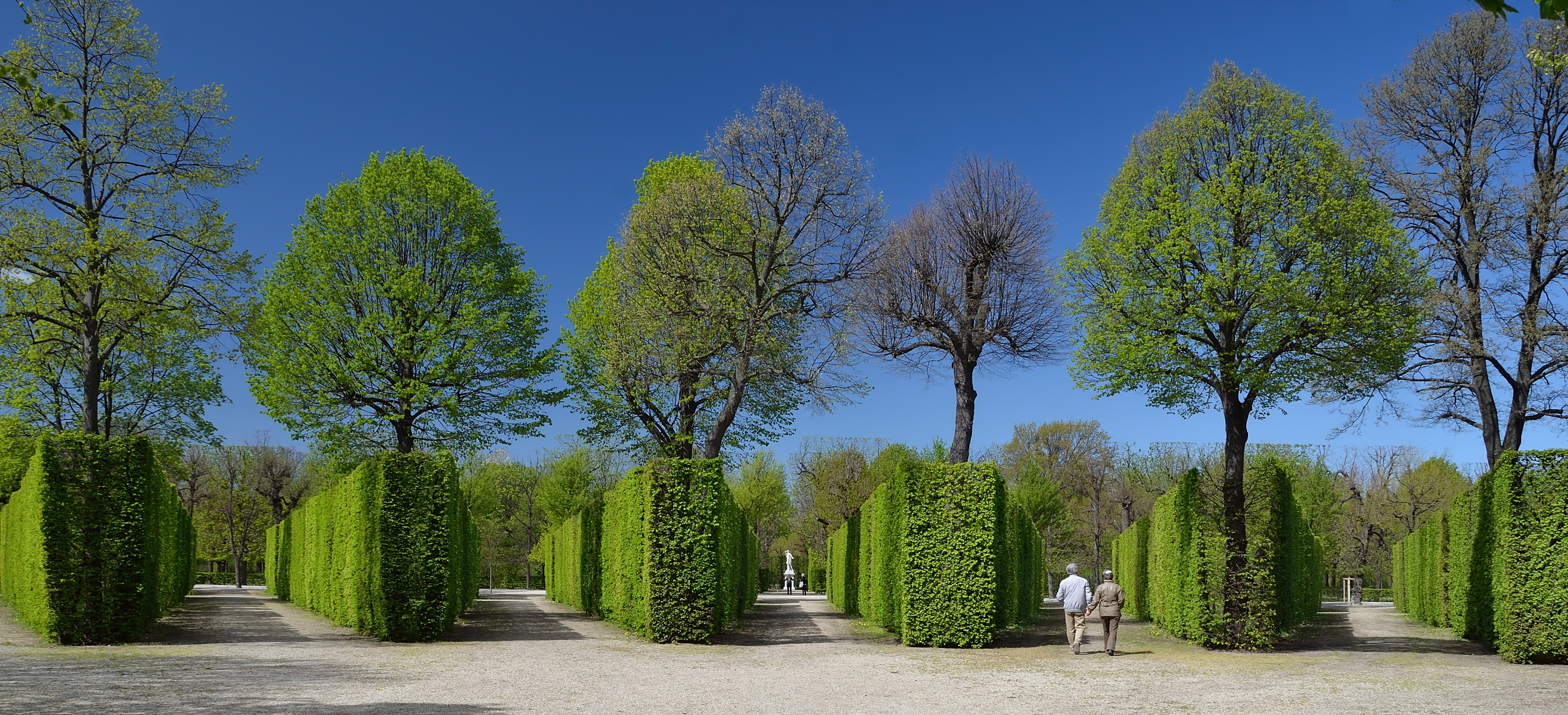
A bosquet in the gardens of Schönbrunn Palace in Vienna. It is shaped like a fan and therefore is called "der Fächer" in German. The gardens were designed mainly during the reign of Maria Theresa (1740 - 1780) and have been preserved together with the buildings as a remarkable Baroque ensemble, which was catalogued as a World Heritage Site by UNESCO in 1996.

In the French formal garden, a bosquet (French, from Italian boschetto, "grove, wood") is a formal plantation of trees in a wide variety of forms, some open at the bottom and others not. At a minimum a bosquet can be five trees of identical species planted as a quincunx (like a 5 dice), or set in strict regularity as to rank and file, so that the trunks line up as one passes along either face. In large gardens they were dense artificial woodland, often covering large areas, with tall hedges on the outside and other trees inside the hedges. Symbolic of order in a humanized and tamed gardens of the French Renaissance and Baroque French formal gardens, the bosquet is an analogue of the orderly orchard, an amenity that has been intimately associated with pleasure gardening from the earliest Persian gardens of the Achaemenid Empire.

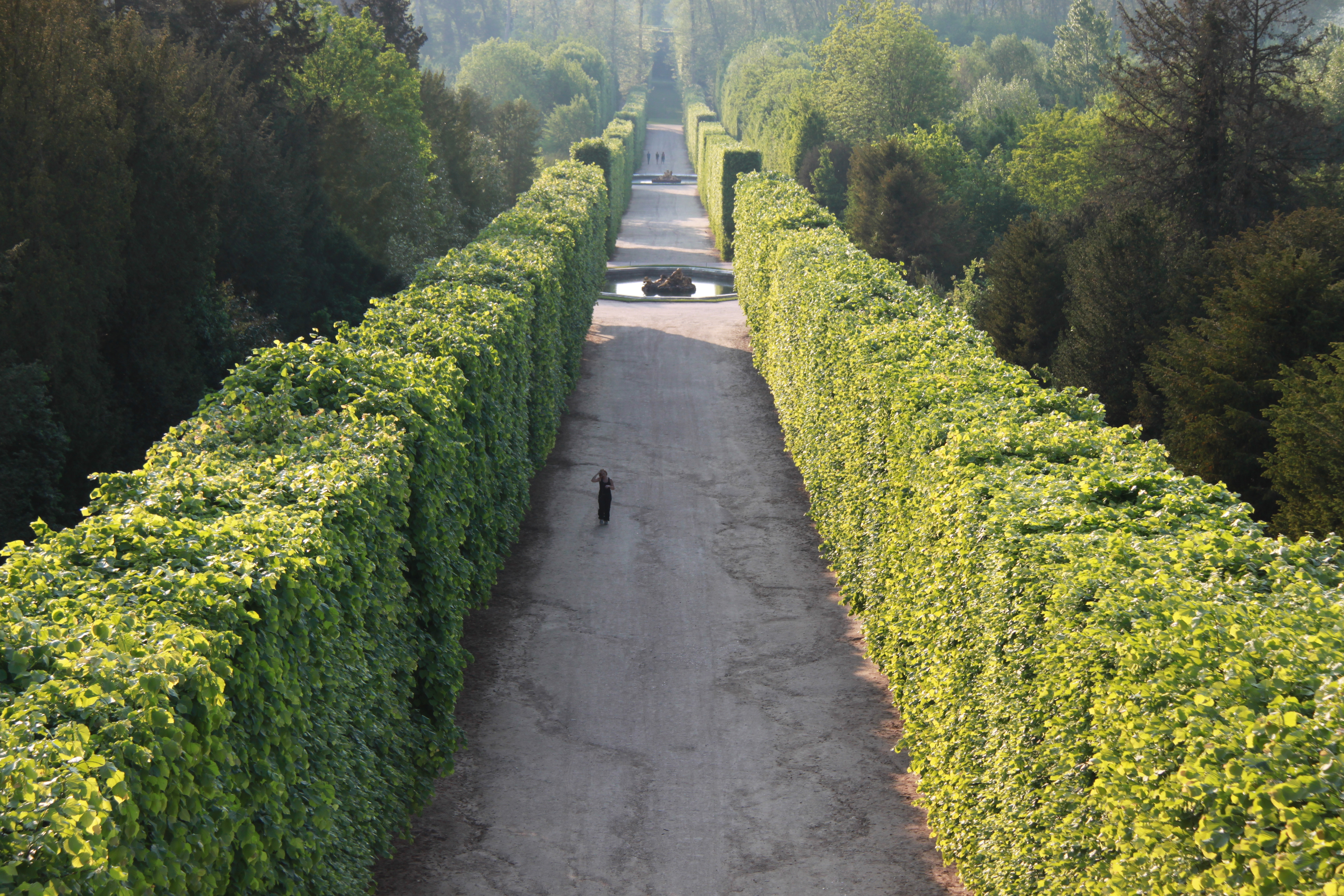
The full French formal style; an alley or walk in a bosquet in the Gardens of Versailles.

Bosket is an English rendition of the word, now obsolete; the usual English term for a large hedged bosquet was a "wilderness", while smaller unhedged ones were often called "groves".

== Characteristics ==
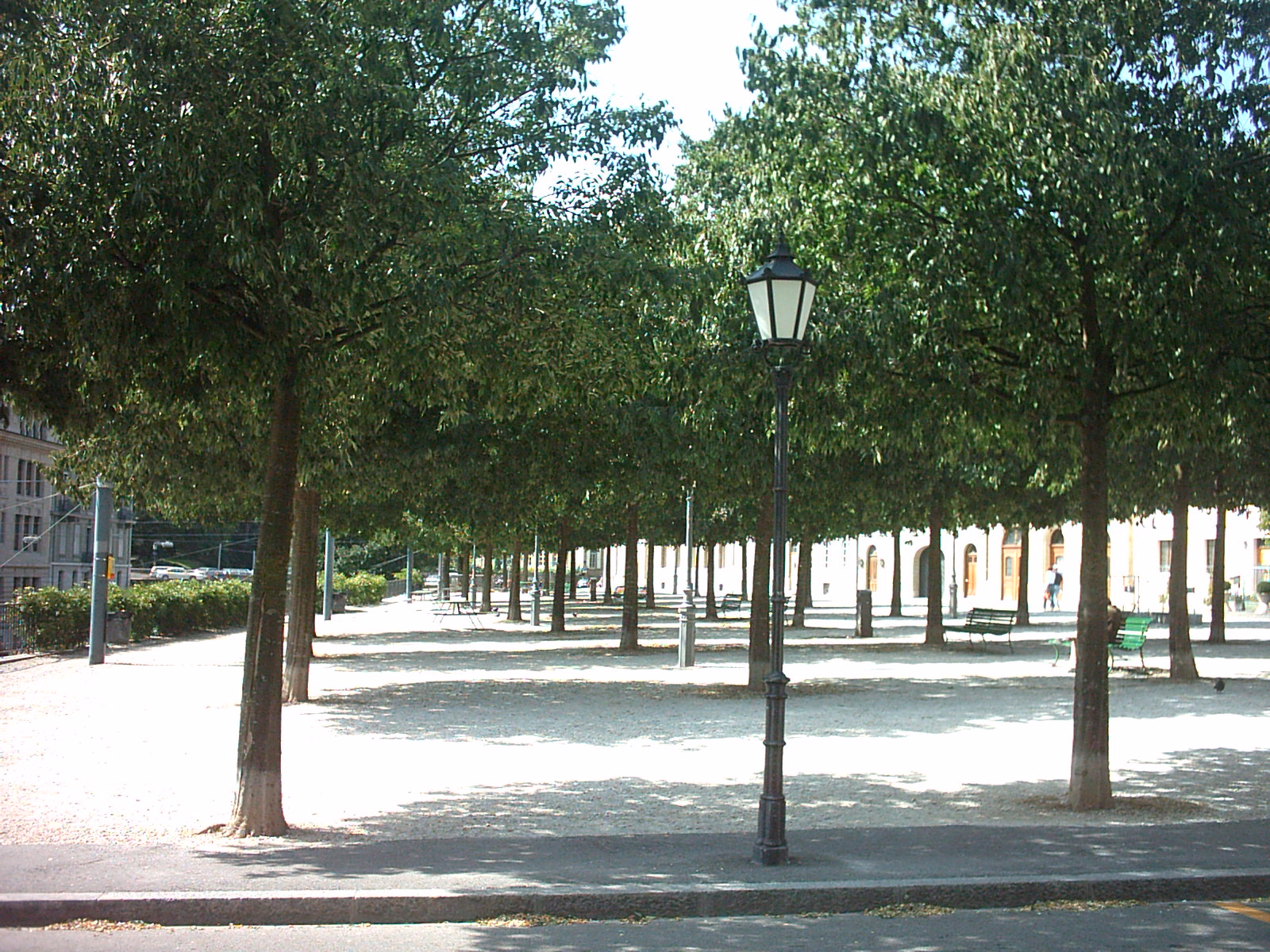
Bosquet in the Promenade Saint-Antoine, Geneva

Open bosquets traditionally have gravel laid, as the feature predates Budding's invention of the lawnmower, and since the maintenance of turf under trees is demanding (but see the modern bosquet at Amboise, right). The shade of paired bosquets flanking a parterre affords both relief from the sunny glare and the pleasure of surveying sunlit space from shade, another Achaemenid invention.

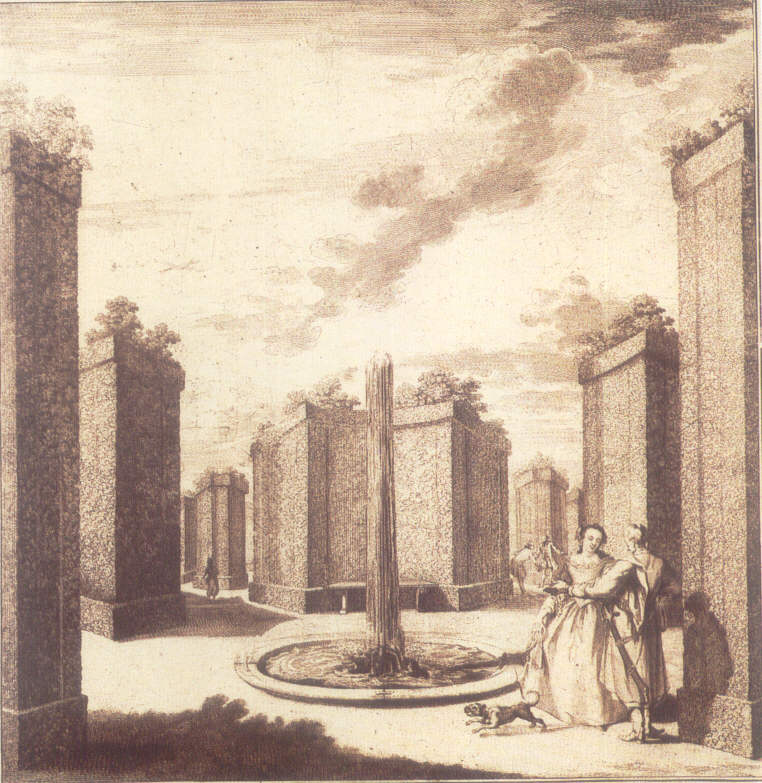
Bosquet of the Branicki Palace in Białystok, 1750s

As they mature, the trees of the bosquet form an interlacing canopy overhead, and they are frequently limbed-up to reveal the pattern of identical trunks. Lower trunks may be given a lime wash to a selected height, which emphasizes the pattern. Clipped outer faces of the trees may be pleached.

Within a large bosquet there are often garden rooms, a cabinet de verdure cut into the formal woodland, a major ingredient of André Le Nôtre's Versailles. These intimate areas defined by clipped walls of shrubs and trees offered privacy and relief from the grand scale and public formality of the terraces and allées. Often a single path with a discreet curve or dogleg provided the only access. Inside the bosquet, privacy was assured; there virtuoso jeux d'eau and sculpture provided allegorical themes: there is a theatre in the Bosquet des Rocailles. The bosquets were altered often during the years Le Nôtre worked at Versailles.

The bosquets of Versailles were examples of a matured tradition. They were preceded by simple squares of regularly planted bosquet alternating checkerboard fashion with open squares centering statues, outlined by linking allées in an illustration of an ideal grand garden plan in André Mollet's Le jardin de plaisir, 1651. In Alexandre Francini's engravings (1614) of the royal gardens at Fontainebleau and Saint Germain-en-Laye, compartments of bosquets are already in evidence. In Jacques Boyceau's posthumous Traité du iardinage selon les raisons de la nature et de l'art (1638), designs for bosquets alternate with patterns for parterres.

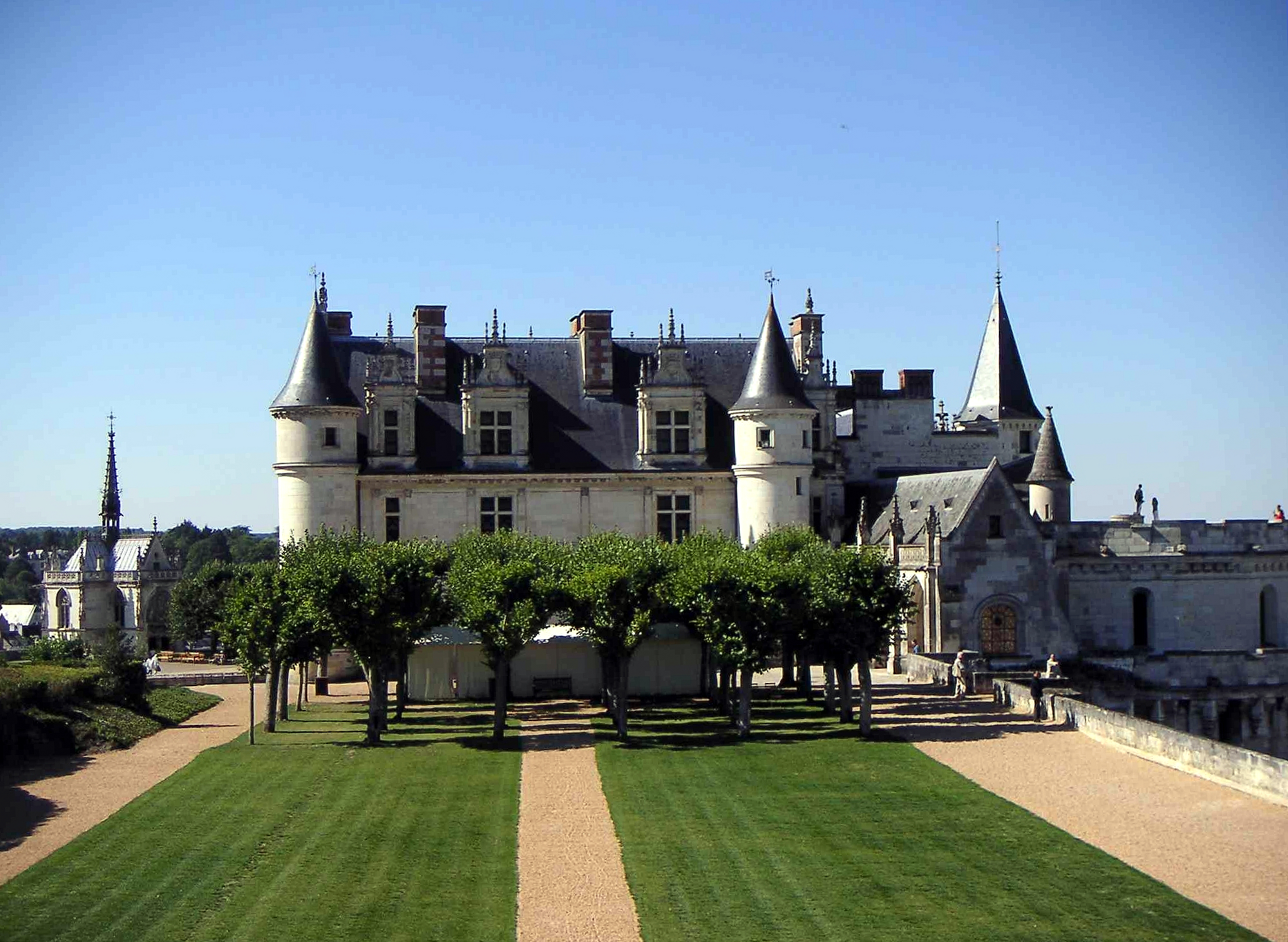
Château d'Amboise: the parterres have been recreated in the twentieth century as rectangles of lawns set in gravel and a formal bosquet of trees

In the eighteenth-century, bosquets flanked the Champs-Elysées, Paris. In Paris, bosquets set in gravel may still be enjoyed in the Jardin des Tuileries and the Jardin du Luxembourg.

After a century of naturalistic landscape gardening and two generations of revived pattern planting some bosquets re-entered garden design at the turn of the twentieth century. The garden at Easton Lodge, Essex, designed by Harold Peto inherited what was now called a bosquet but was originally a seventeenth-century garden wilderness, the English variant of the bosquet: "This ornamental grove or thicket was planted with native tree species approximately 400 years ago and originally included a path network of concentric circles and radiating lines." (ref. Easton Lodge)

Bosquets, unfamiliar in American gardens, but introduced in the Beaux-Arts gardens of Charles A. Platt, were planted along the Fifth Avenue front of the Metropolitan Museum in 1969–70.

Typical trees employed for bosquets are fine-scaled in leaf, such as linden (Tilia cordata), hornbeam (Carpinus) or hazelnut (Corylus).

== In media ==
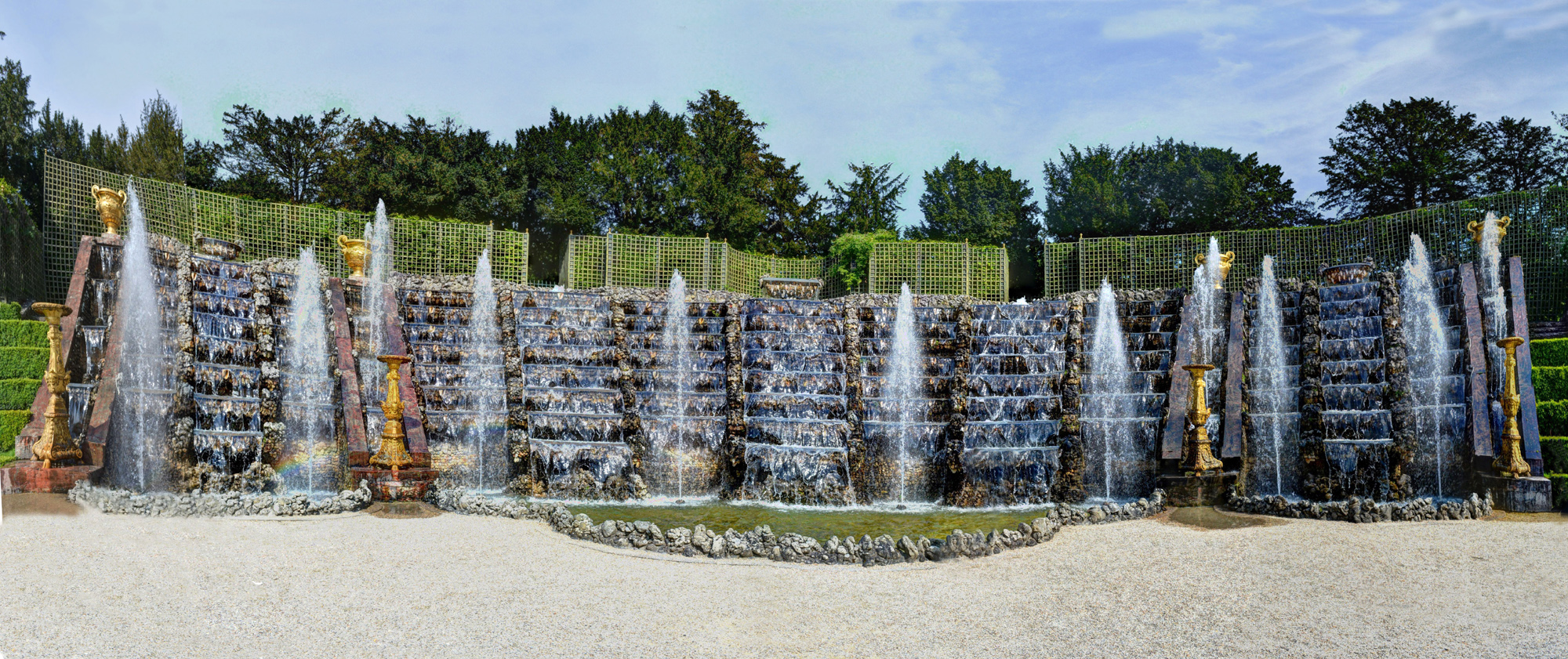
Bosquet de la Salle-de-Bal at Gardens of Versailles, laid out by André Le Nôtre between 1680 and 1683.

The construction of a bosquet for the king at Versailles was a central feature of the 2014 film A Little Chaos featuring Kate Winslet and directed by Alan Rickman. It was based on the original constructed by André Le Nôtre between 1680 and 1683.

== See also ==
- Forest stand
