= Listed buildings in Melbourne, Derbyshire =

Melbourne is a civil parish in the Derbyshire Dales district of Derbyshire, England. The parish contains 133 listed buildings that are recorded in the National Heritage List for England. Of these, 24 are listed at Grade I, the highest of the three grades, seven are at Grade II*, the middle grade, and the others are at Grade II, the lowest grade. The parish contains the market town of Melbourne, the village of Kings Newton, and the surrounding area. One of the most notable buildings in the parish is Melbourne Hall, which is listed, and in its gardens are numerous listed buildings, many designated at Grade I, and include lead sculptures by Jan van Nost. Elsewhere, most of the listed buildings are houses, cottages and associated structures, farmhouses and farm buildings. The other listed buildings include churches, a market cross and a village cross, a water mill and associated buildings, a road bridge, a railway bridge, a well head, a pair of tombs, a former school, a workshop and a smithy, public houses, a market lamp, a boathouse, almshouses, and cemetery buildings.

== Key ==
Grade	Criteria
I	Buildings of exceptional interest, sometimes considered to be internationally important
II*	Particularly important buildings of more than special interest
II	Buildings of national importance and special interest

== Buildings ==
Name and location	Photograph	Date	Notes	Grade
St Michael with St Mary's Church; 52.82115°N 1.42419°W		c. 1120 (probable)	The church has been altered and extended through the centuries, and was restored in 1859–60 by George Gilbert Scott. It is in stone with lead roofs, and consists of a nave with a clerestory, a western narthex flanked by towers, north and south aisles, north and south transepts, a tower at the crossing, and a chancel. At the west end is a 12th-century semicircular entrance with five orders and carved capitals, and above it is a four-light window with a hood mould and a shallow gable. The flanking towers are unfinished and have clasping buttresses, and projecting parapets on corbel tables. In each aisle is a small 12th-century doorway, each with one order. The crossing tower has two stages, a clock face on the north side, bell openings in the upper stage, over which is a string course with gargoyles and an embattled parapet.	I
Castle Farmhouse, ruins of Melbourne Castle, and outbuildings 52.82321°N 1.42473°W	—	c. 1311	The farmhouse dates from the late 17th century. It is in red brick on a stone plinth with quoins, and a tile roof with brick coped gables. There are two storeys and attics, three bays, and a single-storey wing to the east. The doorway has a four-centred arch, the windows vary, and there are gabled dormers. Attached to the east are the remains of the castle, consisting of a wall about 20 feet (6.1 m) high and about 20 yards (18 m) long. Parts of the wall have been incorporated into outbuildings to the north. In the attic of the farmhouse are three oak cruck trusses.	II
Village Cross, Kings Newton; 52.83214°N 1.42157°W		Medieval	The cross stands by a crossroads in the centre of the village, and the oldest part is the base, with the top added in 1936. The base is large and stepped, and it carries a later Celtic cross on a plain base. On the south side of the base is an inscription.	II
51 Church Street; 52.82178°N 1.42521°W	—	14th century	The house, which was altered in the 18th and 19th centuries, has a ground floor in stone, with red brick above, and a floor band between. The west front has a stepped eaves cornice, and the roof is tiled with a brick coped gable to the north. There are two storeys and an L-shaped plan. The south front is gabled and contains a three-light horizontally-sliding sash window in the ground floor, and a three-light casement window above. In the west front is a segmental-headed doorway, and in the rear wing is a dormer.	II
Tithe Barn; 52.82098°N 1.42464°W		14th or 15th century	A threshing barn that has been altered and extended, it is in massive stone blocks, with patching in stone and red brick, red brick in the upper part, a dentilled eaves band, and a roof of red and blue tile with brick coped gables. There is a single storey, a basement and an attic, seven bays, a lower single-bay extension to the east, and a six-bay extension to the south. The barn contains various openings, some with chamfered surrounds, including two doorways with four-centred arches, one blocked, and a segmental-headed doorway, and external steps lead up to an upper floor doorway.	II*
11, 15 and 19 High Street; 52.82247°N 1.42999°W	—	15th century	Three cottages, the later ones added in the 18th and 19th centuries. The oldest cottage, facing the road, has a timber framed core with cruck trusses, later encased in red brick, and a thatched roof. It has a single storey and an attic, and contains five windows and an eyebrow dormer, all horizontally sliding sashes with segmental heads. Inside, there are cruck trusses and an inglenook fireplace. To the left at right angles, with the gabled front facing the road, is the 18th-century addition. This is in red brick with a slate roof and two storeys. In the ground floor is a shop window, to its right is a doorway, and above is a sash window, both with segmental heads. On the left return are three bays, containing an oval window, a segmental-headed opening, and sash and casement windows with segmental heads. The 19th-century addition to the south has a single-light and casement windows.	II
54 and 56 Main Street; 52.83180°N 1.42446°W		15th century	A pair of cottages, later altered and extended and converted into one house. It is cruck and timber framed, with painted brick nogging, extensions in painted brick, on a stone plinth, with a tile roof. There is a single storey and attics, four bays, and a rear range. On the street front is a lean-to with a large brick chimney stack. The windows are a mix of casements and horizontally-sliding sashes, and there is a gabled half-dormer. In the east gable wall is an exposed cruck truss.	II
Chantry House and outbuildings 52.82172°N 1.42573°W		15th century	The oldest parts are the outbuildings, with the house dating from the mid-18th century. The outbuildings are cruck framed, they were later encased in brick and stone, and have a tile roof, a single storey and attics. The house is in red brick with stone dressings on a plinth, and has quoins, a sill band, a moulded cornice and a blocking course, and a tile roof with stone coped gables. There are three bays, and a double range plan, with a three-storey range to the north and a two-storey range to the south. In the centre is a doorway with a moulded surround and a re-used cornice on consoles. On the front are sash windows with rusticated wedge lintels and double keystones, and elsewhere are casement windows. Inside the outbuildings are three cruck trusses.	II
Aisled barn, Melbourne Hall; 52.82156°N 1.42368°W	—	15th century	The aisled barn has a timber framed core, and was later encased in red brick on a plinth, with stone gable walls, and a tile roof with roof lights. There is a single storey and seven bays. The openings include double doors, a segmental-headed doorway, cross windows, a horizontally-sliding sash window and a gabled dormer.	I
56 Potter Street; 52.82286°N 1.42574°W		16th century	A timber framed cottage with painted brick nogging on a stone plinth with a thatched roof. There is a single storey with attics, and two bays. To the west is a doorway, in the centre is a two-light horizontally-sliding sash window, and to the right is a fixed window. Above are two eyebrow dormers with casements.	II
58 Main Street; 52.83183°N 1.42422°W		16th century	Two cottages with a timber framed front combined into one house, and largely rebuilt, it has a stone plinth, painted brick nogging, brick on the sides and at the rear, and a tile roof. There is a single storey and attics, and two bays. On the front is a doorway and two two-light windows, and above are two large gabled dormers containing two-light small-paned casements.	II
Barn, Castle Farm; 52.82336°N 1.42429°W	—	16th century	The barn, which was later extended, is timber framed with brick nogging on a stone plinth, later red brick painted to resemble timber framing, and a pantile roof. There is a single storey and three bays. The barn has two full-height openings, and vents in a diamond pattern.	II
Chantry House, Kings Newton; 52.83199°N 1.42434°W		16th century	The house was altered later, particularly in the 19th century. It is in stone at the front, and in stone and brick elsewhere, with a floor band, and a tile roof with stone coped gables and moulded kneelers. There are two storeys and attics, and four gabled bays, the left gable smaller. On the front is a gabled porch that has a four-centred arched doorway with a hood mould, and an internal doorway with a moulded surround and a moulded keystone. To the west is a bay window, and the other windows are mullioned or cross windows, most with hood moulds, and there are three half-dormers, one with a shield above. Inside, there is a large inglenook fireplace.	II
Melbourne Hall; 52.82117°N 1.42316°W		16th century	A country house that has been altered and extended, including in 1725–26 by Francis Smith of Warwick. It is in stone with quoins, and a hipped roof of Westmorland green slate. There are two storeys and attics and a half H-shaped plan, with a south entrance front of six bays, and an east garden front of seven bays. The central part of the entrance front is recessed and contains a conservatory. On each side are doorways with moulded surrounds, pulvinated friezes, a keystone, and a moulded cornice, and in the centre is a doorway with a Gibbs surround, a pulvinated frieze, and a triangular pediment. Most of the windows are sashes, some with keystones and some with Gibbs surrounds, and elsewhere are casement windows, mullioned and transomed windows, and dormers with hipped roofs.	II*
Hall Cottages and Stables, Melbourne Hall; 52.82136°N 1.42357°W	—	16th century	The building has been altered and extended, and consists of two cottages, stables, and a coach house forming two ranges at right angles. It is in red brick with stone dressings and tile roofs, and the west range has a chamfered plinth. There are two storeys, the north range has four bays, and the west range has five. The north range contains two depressed segmental archways, and on the roof is an octagonal cupola with an ogee lead roof and a weathervane. The ranges contain various doorways and windows.	II*
Four Gables; 52.83171°N 1.42579°W	—	Late 16th century	A house that was later extended, with four bays, and a tile roof with overhanging eaves. The left bay is the earliest, it is gabled and timber framed, with painted brick nogging, on a plinth, and has two storeys. The other three bays are in painted brick and have a single storey and attics. On the front is an open gabled porch, the windows are small-paned casements, and in each of the three right bays is a gabled dormer.	II
Thatched Cottage; 52.82298°N 1.42539°W		Late 16th century	Three cottages combined into one, it is timber framed with painted brick nogging, rebuilt in brick at the west end, with a dentilled eaves band towards the west, and it has a thatched roof. There is a single storey and attics, and six bays. It contains two doorways and garage doors, all with segmental heads. In the ground floor the windows consist of a casement window and horizontally-sliding sashes, some with segmental heads, and in the attics are five dormers, one elongated.	II
Kings Newton Hall; 52.83204°N 1.42551°W		Early 17th century	A small country house that was rebuilt in 1910 following a fire. It is in stone on a chamfered plinth, with quoins, a moulded string course and a slate roof. There are two storeys and attics, and an H-shaped plan, with a central range of three bays, and projecting gabled cross-wings. In the centre is a moulded four-centred arch, a porch and a similar doorway, and this is flanked by single-light windows. Elsewhere, there are cross windows, and in the centre and on the cross-wings are dormers with hipped roofs. In the west front is a central gabled bay containing a three-light stair window with a hood mould.	II
The Old Mill; 52.82020°N 1.42181°W		Early 17th century	The watermill and outbuilding were later extended, and were converted into a house is about 1965. It is in stone with quoins, partly rendered, and red brick, and has tile roofs with moulded gable copings and parapets. There is a single storey and attics, and a single bay, with an extension linking to a two-bay outbuilding. The doorway has a chamfered surround and most of the windows are mullioned.	II
Muniment Room, Melbourne Hall Garden; 52.82154°N 1.42246°W	—	17th century	Originally a dovecote, it was remodelled in 1709 and later used for other purposes. It is in stone with quoins, a band, a moulded cornice, and a rounded ogee slate roof with a ball finial. There is a single storey and a basement, and an octagonal plan. On the southeast side, steps lead down to a basement doorway with a four-centred arched head, and on the south side, steps lead up to a doorway with a plain surround and a keystone. There are sash windows with keystones on two sides.	I
32 Trent Lane, Kings Newton; 52.83376°N 1.42197°W	—	17th century	A house in red brick with some stone, quoins, a dentilled band, dentilled eaves, and a tile roof. There is a single storey and attics, and two bays. The central doorway has a chamfered stone lintel, and is flanked by casement windows with segmental heads. Above are two gabled dormers containing horizontally-sliding sash windows.	II
Broadways; 52.83165°N 1.42691°W		17th century	Three cottages combined into one, it is timber framed with painted brick nogging on a stone plinth on the front, in painted brick and stone elsewhere, and has a tile roof. There is a single storey and attics, and three bays. On the front is a doorway with a timber porch and two fixed small-pane windows, and above are three gabled half-dormers with casements.	II
Dower House Cottage and outbuildings 52.82122°N 1.42524°W	—	17th century	The cottage has a single storey and attics, and three bays, the two north bays in stone, the south bay in brick, and with a red tile roof. It has flush quoins, in the ground floor the windows are casements, and above are three raking dormers with horizontally-sliding sashes. The outbuilding attached to the south has a single storey in red brick with a blue tile roof. It contains a segmental-headed doorway, a single-light metal window, and three sash windows under a stone lintel.	II
Gates and walls, Kings Newton Hall; 52.83183°N 1.42544°W		17th century	Flanking the entrance to the drive are tall panelled stone gate piers with moulded cornices and ball finials. Between them are iron gates and an overthrow. Outside the piers are ramped walls with double chamfered copings, and beyond is a stone wall extending for 500 metres (1,600 ft), with double chamfered copings on a chamfered plinth.	II
Kings Newton House, gates and outbuildings 52.83200°N 1.42189°W		17th century	The house, which was altered in 1802–04, is in rendered stone on a stone plinth, and has a hipped slate roof with wide eaves. There are three storeys and three bays, and a large extension at the rear. On the front facing the road is a central bow window and sash windows. In the east return is a semicircular-headed doorway with a traceried fanlight, and at the rear is a two-storey extension, and a range of outbuildings. To the east of the house is a curved wall leading to a pair of gate piers. These are rusticated, and have pyramidal coping stones.	II
New Bridge; 52.83022°N 1.41246°W		17th century	The bridge carries Melbourne Road over Ramsley Brook, and it was widened in the 20th century. It is in stone and concrete, and consists of two chamfered four-centred arches. There are triangular-section cutwaters on the north face, and plain stone parapets.	II
The White Swan Inn; 52.82263°N 1.42513°W		17th century	The public house, which was partly rebuilt in the 19th century, is in painted roughcast on a chamfered stone plinth, with a stepped eaves band, and a tile roof. There are two storeys and attics, and three bays. On the front is a doorway with a hood mould, casement windows in the ground floor, and above are horizontally-sliding sashes. The east gabled front facing the street contains a casement window in the ground floor, a sash window in the upper floor, and a small-pane window in the attic.	II
Tithe Cottage; 52.82088°N 1.42424°W		17th century	A stone house on a rendered plinth, with quoins and a tile roof. The south front has three storeys and attics, and the north front has two storeys. There are four bays, and a two-bay extension to the west. On the front is a porch with a pointed arch on moulded responds, with a hood mould and a moulded cornice. The doorway is flanked by blocked windows, above it is a small window, and elsewhere the windows are mixed, some are mullioned, and some are casement windows. Inside the house is a timber framed wall and an inglenook fireplace.	II
Well head 52.82530°N 1.42586°W	—	17th century	The well head is in stone, it has short walls on three sides, and is capped by a large triangular-shaped coping stone forming a roof. The south side is open and has moulded edges, and at its base is a stone trough.	II
Garden walls and railings, Melbourne Hall; 52.82092°N 1.42293°W	—	Late 17th century	The walls are attached to the south front of the hall, and are about 12 feet (3.7 m) high, with stone on the east face and red brick on the west face. At the north end of each wall is a rusticated semicircular-headed arch with a double keystone, and at the south end is a tall pier with a plain entablature and a banded ball finial. Attached to the eastern pier are wrought iron railings by Robert Bakewell, with lyre-shaped standards and a strapwork frieze. Extending to the east is a stone wall enclosing the garden on the south, and at its end is a segmental-headed doorway.	I
Pair of pedestals supporting fruit bowl vase, Melbourne Hall Gardens; 52.82127°N 1.42273°W	—	Late 17th century	The pedestals are in stone. Each is plain, on a stepped plinth, and it carries a large lattice-work basket containing fruit and flowers, standing on a moulded tapering base.	I
Pair of cherubs (north), Melbourne Hall Gardens; 52.82143°N 1.42098°W		1699–1700	The statues of cherubs by Jan van Nost are in lead, and stand on a stone pedestal with a moulded base and cornice. The western cherub is standing ready to draw his bow, which is now missing, and the eastern one is flying, and has a quiver on his back.	I
Pair of cherubs (south), Melbourne Hall Gardens; 52.82064°N 1.42103°W	—	1699–1700	The statues of cherubs by Jan van Nost are in lead, and stand on a stone pedestal with a moulded base and cornice. The eastern cherub is climbing up a tree with a quiver on his back and is covered in bees, and the western one is shaping his bow.	I
Pair of pedestals with lead slaves, Melbourne Hall Gardens; 52.82123°N 1.42213°W	—	1699–1700	The statues of slaves are by Jan van Nost and are in lead. Each stands on a plain stone base with a moulded top. The slaves are kneeling and are naked apart from loin cloths, one of which is feathered. The other slave wears a turban and has a plain loin cloth.	I
Pedestal with statue of Andromeda, Melbourne Hall Gardens; 52.82132°N 1.41993°W		1699–1700	The statue of Andromeda is by Jan van Nost and is in lead. It stands on a stone pedestal with a wide square plinth and panelled sides. The statue depicts a life-size, half-naked female figure leaning against the rock to which she is chained, with her right arm raised.	I
Pedestal with statue of Mercury, Melbourne Hall Gardens; 52.82104°N 1.42098°W	—	1699–1700	The statue of Mercury is by Jan van Nost and is in lead. It stands on a stone pedestal with a moulded base and cornice on a stepped square plinth. The statue depicts Mercury in flight with his right arm raised, holding a winged rod with intertwined serpents in his left hand. The helmet and ankles are winged, and the figure stands on the forehead of a wind-blowing cherub.	I
Pedestal with statue of Perseus, Melbourne Hall Gardens; 52.82070°N 1.41991°W	—	1699–1700	The statue of Perseus is by Jan van Nost and is in lead. It stands on a stone pedestal with a wide square plinth and panelled sides. The statue depicts a life-size figure of Perseus holding Medusa's head, dressed in Roman-style armour with winged sandals and a helmet.	I
Two pairs of cherubs (northwest), Melbourne Hall Gardens; 52.82145°N 1.42061°W		1699–1700	The statues are by Jan van Nost and are in lead. Each statue stands on a panelled stone pedestal with a moulded base and cornice. The statues depict cherubs, on the west side one cherub is snatching a bunch of lilies from the other, and on the east side they are quarrelling.	I
Two pairs of cherubs (southwest), Melbourne Hall Gardens; 52.82062°N 1.42054°W	—	1699–1700	The statues are by Jan van Nost and are in lead. Each statue stands on a panelled stone pedestal with a moulded base and cornice. The statues depict cherubs, the western pair are kissing, and the eastern pair are fighting.	I
Covered seat east of Fountain Pond Melbourne Hall Gardens; 52.81983°N 1.41919°W	—	c. 1704	The seat is a curved timber bench on turned legs, set in an apsidal building with a stuccoed segmental brick wall and a lead dome. The building has panelled timber jambs and a segmental cornice with a raised keystone.	I
Covered seat west of Fountain Pond Melbourne Hall Gardens; 52.82014°N 1.42088°W	—	c. 1704	The seat is a curved timber bench on turned legs, set in an apsidal building with a stuccoed segmental brick wall and a lead dome. The building has panelled timber jambs and a segmental cornice with a raised keystone.	I
Five flights of steps, Melbourne Hall Gardens; 52.82105°N 1.42149°W	—	c. 1704	There are two flights of stone steps on each side of the terrace and one in the centre. Each flight has ten steps with moulded nosings, and low retaining walls ending in low square piers with gadrooned urns.	I
Pair of garden walls, Melbourne Hall Gardens; 52.82067°N 1.42232°W	—	c. 1704	The walls flank the Top Terrace, they are about 15 feet (4.6 m) high, and stretch the length of the terrace. They are in red brick with stone dressings on a deep red brick plinth with chamfered copings, and have flat copings with moulded sides. At the east end of each wall is a pilaster strip on a moulded stone base, and there are later extensions, each incorporating a doorway with a segmental head.	II*
Stone fountain (north), Melbourne Hall Gardens; 52.82152°N 1.42095°W		c. 1704	The fountain is in a circular stone pool with moulded nosings on copings. In the centre is a plain stone pedestal on which is a lead statue by Jan van Nost depicting a boy with a fountain coming from his hand.	I
Stone fountain (south), Melbourne Hall Gardens; 52.82057°N 1.42100°W	—	c. 1704	The fountain is in a circular stone pool with moulded nosings on copings. In the centre is a plain stone pedestal on which is a lead statue by Jan van Nost depicting a boy blowing a whistle, from which the fountain issues.	I
Three forcing walls and greenhouses, Melbourne Hall Gardens; 52.81953°N 1.41968°W	—	c. 1704	The forcing walls are in red brick with vitrified headers and stone copings. There are three walls 12 feet (3.7 m) high, about 30 feet (9.1 m) apart, with pilaster strips. Attached to the two northern walls are later outbuildings and greenhouses.	II
Vase and pedestal, Melbourne Hall Gardens; 52.81949°N 1.42083°W	—	c. 1704	The pedestal is by Devigne, and the vase dates from the 18th century; both are in stone. The pedestal is cylindrical on a circular plinth, and has acanthus leaf decoration on the base, and a moulded cornice. The sides are decorated with carved swags, and baroque panels with initials flanked by putti. The vase has laurel leaf decoration on the base and Vitruvian scroll, and on the lid is a Greek key pattern and acanthus leaf carving.	I
Pedestal and Four Seasons Vase, Melbourne Hall Gardens; 52.81924°N 1.42049°W		1705	The pedestal is in stone, and was carved by Devigne. It has a moulded base and cornice on a stepped plinth, and on each side is a panel carved with foliage and swags, and with a central initialled roundel. The pedestal carries a lead vase by Jan van Nost in Baroque style. The vase is supported by four monkeys, and has a gadrooned base, and a stem decorated with a frieze of putti and foliage swags. The lid has a bulbous base and four scrolled handles, each with the head of a Season. On the top is a lattice-work basket with fruit and flowers.	I
Birdcage Arbour, Melbourne Hall Gardens; 52.82100°N 1.41945°W		c. 1706–08	The arbour is in wrought iron, with a room at the rear in stuccoed brick with a lead roof, and is by Robert Bakewell. It consists of a cage-like structure with an open domed roof, over which is an open cupola with a finial. Five steps lead up to the arbour, which has elaborate panels of decorative ironwork with scrolls and foliage. The room has a segmental arch with a moulded keystone, and contains a stone bench with turned legs.	I
Tea Rooms and walls, Melbourne Hall; 52.82172°N 1.42283°W		1709	Originally a laundry, later used as tea rooms, the building is in stone with quoins, a floor band, and a tile roof with stone coped gables and plain kneelers, and there is an addition in red brick. There are two storeys and seven bays and a single-storey extension. There are two doorways with small-pane fanlights, and the windows are small-pane cross windows with raised keystones. In the centre of the upper floor is an inscribed circle. Inside there is an inglenook fireplace at each end. Attached to the buildings are walls, in red brick to the west, and in stone to the east, both with stone copings.	I
49 Church Street; 52.82182°N 1.42536°W	—	Early 18th century	The house, which has been extended, is in rendered brick, with a stepped eaves band, and a tile roof. There are three storeys, three bays, and a gabled two-storey wing projecting from the left bay. The doorway has a bracketed porch hood, to its right is a canted bay window with a flat roof, and to the left and in the middle floor are mullioned windows. The top floor and the wing contain three-light casement windows with segmental heads.	II
65 Church Street; 52.82185°N 1.42421°W		Early 18th century	A red brick house with stone dressings, dentilled floor bands, and a tile roof with brick coped gables. There are two storeys and attics, and three bays. The doorway has a plain fanlight, and it is flanked by sash windows with rusticated wedge lintels. The upper floor contains sash windows, and in the attic are three gabled dormers with two-light casements.	II
84, 88 and 90 High Street; 52.82248°N 1.43147°W	—	Early 18th century	Four houses, later three, in two ranges at right angles. They are in red brick, partly with a moulded eaves cornice and partly with a sawtooth eaves band, and with roofs of red and blue tile. They are in two storeys with attics, or three storeys. In both ranges are doorways with segmental heads, and the windows are a mix of casements and sashes, most with segmental or cambered heads. The north range contains a bow window, and in the corner of the west range is a segmental-headed archway.	II
59 Penn Lane; 52.82155°N 1.42820°W	—	Early 18th century	The cottage is in stone in the ground floor and red brick above, and has a dentilled eaves band, and a tile roof. There are two storeys and two bays. The windows are horizontally-sliding sashes, with segmental heads in the ground floor and flat heads above. The doorway in the left gable end has a segmental head, and inside the cottage is an inglenook fireplace.	II
Church House; 52.83195°N 1.42227°W		Early 18th century	The house is in stone on a chamfered plinth, with quoins, a coved eaves cornice, and a tile roof with stone coped gables and plain kneelers. There are two storeys, a basement and attics, and three bays. Three semicircular steps with moulded nosings lead up to the central doorway that has a moulded surround, a keystone and a moulded pediment. In the basement are mullioned windows, partly blocked, and the other windows are top-hung casements, the window above the doorway blind, and all have moulded surrounds and pediments, those in the ground floor also with keystones. At the rear are double gables, and pedimented windows.	II
Close House; 52.82136°N 1.42424°W		Early 18th century	The house was refronted later in the 18th century. It is in red brick with painted stone dressings on a chamfered stone plinth, with painted brick quoins, a floor band, a moulded stone cornice, and a tile roof with coped gables and plain kneelers. There are three storeys and three bays, and a single-storey single-bay extension on the right. The central doorway has a plain surround and a fanlight with Gothic tracery. To its right is a canted bay window, and the other windows are sashes; all the openings have wedge lintels. In the extension is a doorway and a three-light window, both with segmental heads.	II
Stable block, Kings Newton Hall; 52.83204°N 1.42485°W	—	Early 18th century	The stable block is in red brick with a floor band, dentilled eaves and a tile roof. There are two storeys and eight bays. In the ground floor are cross windows, and the upper floor contains eight small-pane casement windows.	II
Pair of curved benches, Melbourne Hall Gardens; 52.82140°N 1.42024°W	—	Early 18th century	The benches are to the north and south of the Grand Basin. Each bench has a segmental-curved slab stone with moulded nosings, set on seven narrow shaped legs on moulded bases.	II*
Pedestal with vase, Melbourne Hall Gardens; 52.81977°N 1.41992°W	—	Early 18th century	The pedestal and vase are in stone. The pedestal has a moulded base and cornice on a stepped square plinth, and panelled sides. The vase is ovoid with reeded sides and a wide moulded lip, and the neck is encircled by a garland of ivy.	I
Three pairs of vases, Melbourne Hall Gardens; 52.82110°N 1.42242°W	—	Early 18th century	The three pairs of urns flank the central path of the Upper Terrace. They have panelled stone bases on stepped plinths, on which are thistle-shaped vases with tapering bases. Each urn has a gadrooned base to the bowl and fluted sides.	I
Walls enclosing Melbourne Hall Gardens; 52.82165°N 1.42040°W	—	Early 18th century	The walls enclosing the gardens are in stone and red brick with stone copings. The northern section contains a pair of stone piers with pyramidal copings and ball finials. In the eastern section are vitrified headers, and in the south section is a blocked segmental-headed doorway. The southeast corner contains a dogs' graveyard, and memorial plaques are inserted into the wall.	II
Water channel and three bridges, Melbourne Hall Gardens; 52.82046°N 1.42080°W		Early 18th century	The channel runs from The Pool, under the Old Mill, to the Grand Basin, and is crossed by three bridges. Each bridge is in stone, and consists of a single segmental arch.	II*
Cottage east of Tutholme; 52.81505°N 1.43120°W	—	Early 18th century	The cottage has a single storey with attics, and two bays. The east bay is in stone, the west bay is in brick on a stone plinth, and the roof is tiled. In the east bay is a blocked doorway and small-pane casement window, and above is a single-light window and a sash window in a raking dormer. The east bay contains a doorway and a fixed window, both with segmental heads. Inside there is an inglenook fireplace.	II
Former Pack Horse Inn; 52.83161°N 1.42888°W		1727	Two cottages, the later one dating from the early 19th century, at one time a public house, later combined into a private house. It is in red brick with dressings in stone and brick, and coped gables. The older part, on the right, has two storeys and two bays, and a dentilled eaves band. On the front is a blocked doorway and horizontal-sliding sash windows, one with a segmental head. The left part has a single storey and an attic and two bays, and a floor band. In the left bay is a canted bay window, to its right is a doorway with a rectangular fanlight, a sash window, and a doorway with a chamfered surround and an initialled and dated lintel. The attic contains two gabled dormers.	II
Melbourne Baptist Church; 52.82450°N 1.42819°W		1749–50	The church, which was extended in 1832, is in rendered brick with rusticated quoins, bands, and a slate roof with stone coped gables and plain kneelers. There are fronts of three bays, and a lower bay to the west. On the entrance front is a Venetian window, the middle light blocked, the outer lights with keystones, and a lamp bracket over the middle light. The outer bays contain doorways with keystones, and above are three windows with rusticated wedge lintels and keystones. In the gable is an inscribed plaque on consoles, over which is a small moulded circular window.	II
43 and 45 Castle Street; 52.82274°N 1.42519°W		Mid 18th century	A pair of mirror-image cottages in stone with a chamfered eaves band and a tile roof. There are two storeys and two bays. Each cottage has a doorway in the outer part with a corniced keystone. The windows are horizontally-sliding sashes, those in the ground floor with corniced keystones.	II
19 Church Street; 52.82239°N 1.42698°W	—	Mid 18th century	A red brick house on a rendered plinth, with a stepped and dentilled eaves band, and a tile roof with coped gables and plain kneelers. There are two storeys and three bays. Steps lead up to the central doorway that has a moulded surround and a bracketed hood. To its left is an ogee-headed bootscraper and a blocked doorway. The windows in the ground floor are three-light casements with segmental heads, and in the upper floor are horizontally-sliding sash windows.	II
17 Derby Road; 52.82370°N 1.42858°W	—	Mid 18th century	A red brick house on a stone plinth, with painted stone dressings, quoins, a moulded eaves cornice, and a tile roof with stone coped gables and brick kneelers. There are two storeys and attics, and two bays. In the centre is a doorway with a plain surround and a fanlight, and the windows are sashes. All the openings have wedge lintels with keystones.	II
41 Derby Road; 52.82469°N 1.42919°W	—	18th century	The house, which was refronted in the 19th century, is in red brick with painted stone dressings on a rendered plinth, with a timber cornice and a slate roof. There are two storeys and two bays. The central doorway has a traceried fanlight and a hood on moulded brackets. The windows are sashes with wedge lintels.	II
4 and 6 High Street; 52.82279°N 1.42874°W		18th century	A pair of mirror-image red brick houses with painted stone dressings, a dentilled eaves band, and a tile roof. There are two storeys and attics, and two bays. Each house has a doorway in the outer part and sash windows, all with stone lintels, and a dormer with a hipped roof.	II
10 Market Place; 52.82288°N 1.42796°W	—	18th century	A pair of cottages, later combined, in pebbledashed brick and stone, with stepped eaves bands, and a slate roof. There are two storeys and four bays. In the right bay is a 19th-century shop front with a moulded cornice. To the left is a segmental-headed doorway, and three casement windows with segmental heads. The upper floor contains two horizontal-sliding sash windows and two top-hung casement windows. Inside, there is an inglenook fireplace.	II
21 Market Place; 52.82273°N 1.42830°W		18th century	The house, which was refronted in the 19th century, is in red brick with dressings in painted stone and concrete, a stepped eaves band, and a tile roof. There are three storeys and two bays. The doorway in the right bay has a rectangular fanlight, and the windows are sashes; all the openings have rusticated wedge lintels and keystones.	II
16–18 Potter Street; 52.82300°N 1.42697°W		Mid 18th century	A pair of shops with houses, in red brick with dressings in gauged brick and stone, on a plinth, with a moulded eaves cornice, and a tile roof with brick coped gables and stone kneelers. There are three storeys, No. 16 has a single bay, No. 18 has two bays, and between them is a round-arched passageway. Each shop has a shop front with a moulded cornice, and in the upper floors are sash windows.	II
50–54 Potter Street; 52.82287°N 1.42588°W		Mid 18th century	A terrace of three cottages in rendered brick on a stone plinth, with floor bands, a stepped and dentilled eaves band, and a tile roof with stone coped gables and plain kneelers. There are two storeys and attics, and each cottage has one bay. On the front are three doorways, two with segmental heads, and most of the windows are horizontally-sliding sashes, those in the lower two floors with segmental heads.	II
Outbuildings north of Close House; 52.82156°N 1.42427°W	—	Mid 18th century	Originally a barn and cowsheds, the building has later been used for other purposes, and has a single storey and an attic, and two ranges at right angles. The south range has a stone plinth, and on the front is a rustic open porch, a doorway with a fanlight and a segmental head, to its left is a canted bay window, and to the right is a three-light segmental-headed casement window. The west range has a dentilled eaves band, a doorway and windows.	II
Hardinge Arms; 52.83171°N 1.42609°W		18th century	A house, later a public house, in painted brick on a rendered plinth, with vestiges of timber framing, and a tile roof. There are two storeys and four bays, the right bay projecting and gabled. In the right bay is a doorway with a plain surround, and in the second bay is a doorway with a segmental head, flanked by windows with segmental heads. The windows are casements, and in the third bay is a gabled half-dormer.	II
Park Farmhouse; 52.81346°N 1.41349°W	—	18th century	The farmhouse has a stone front, and elsewhere it is in red brick with stone dressings, and has a coved eaves band, and a hipped slate roof. There is a T-shaped plan, with a front of two storeys and three bays, and a rear wing with three storeys and three bays. The front has a plinth and a floor band, the middle bay projects slightly and has pilaster strips. The central doorway has a fanlight, and a conservatory porch with a hipped roof. The windows are sashes, those on the sides with rusticated wedge lintels. In the rear wing are casement windows with segmental heads, and inside the farmhouse are inglenook fireplaces.	II
11 Blanch Croft; 52.82391°N 1.42933°W	—	Late 18th century	A stone house on a plinth, with a coved eaves cornice and a slate roof. There are three storeys and two bays. The doorway is on the left, and the windows are mullioned with three casements. All the openings have wedge lintels and keystones.	II
62 Church Street and smithy 52.82161°N 1.42501°W		Late 18th century	The house is in red brick with a floor band, a dentilled eaves band and a tile roof. There are two storeys and three bays. It contains a doorway and casement windows with segmental heads. The attached smithy is in stone with weatherboarding on the east wall and has a tile roof. There is a single storey and three bays, and it has casement windows on the west and an open bay to the east.	II
23 High Street; 52.82238°N 1.43022°W	—	Late 18th century	A red brick house with a 'dentilled eaves band and a tile roof. There are two storeys and two bays. The doorway has a segmental head and a porch roof, in the ground floor are casement windows with segmental heads, and the upper floor contain horizontally-sliding sash windows with flat heads; all the windows have small panes.	II
14 Market Place; 52.82270°N 1.42789°W	—	Late 18th century	A house and cottage, later combined into a house, it is in rendered brick with painted stone dressings and a tile roof. The house has a moulded cornice, and the cottage has a dentilled eaves band. In the house there are two storeys and a basement, and two bays, and the lower cottage to the right has two storeys and one bay. Steps lead up to a doorway in the house, which has pilasters and a moulded cornice. To the left is a bow window, and the other windows are sashes with wedge lintels and keystones. The cottage contains a doorway and small-pane windows, the window in the upper floor with a segmental head.	II
17 and 18 Market Place; 52.82272°N 1.42812°W		Late 18th century	Four houses combined into two, they are in red brick, with some stone, dentilled eaves bands, and a tile roof. There are three storeys and five bays. The left bay has two storeys and contains a segmental archway. Each house has a doorway, and most of the windows are horizontally-sliding sashes. The windows in the lower two floors have segmental heads, and in the top floor they have flat heads.	II
26–28 Potter Street; 52.82292°N 1.42647°W		Late 18th century	A house and a shop in red brick on a plinth, with a stepped and dentilled eaves band and a tile roof. There are three storeys and three bays. The house on the left has a doorway with a plain surround, and a rusticated wedge lintel and a keystone, and to the right is a small window. Further to the right is a shop front, the doorway with a fanlight, and a moulded cornice above. The windows are horizontally-sliding sashes, those in the ground and middle floors with segmental heads.	II
Crofton House; 52.83227°N 1.42171°W		Late 18th century	A red brick house with painted stone dressings, a dentilled eaves band, and a slate roof. There are two storeys and attics, and three bays. The central doorway has pilasters, a triglyph frieze, a modillion cornice, and a traceried fanlight. The windows are sashes with rusticated wedge lintels.	II
Exchange House; 52.82326°N 1.42744°W		Late 18th century	The house is in stone on a plinth, and has a moulded eaves cornice, and a tile roof with coped gables and plain kneelers. There are two storeys and attics, and three bays. The central doorway has a divided fanlight, and the windows are cross windows, all with rusticated wedge lintels and keystones.	II
Outbuilding east of Kings Newton Hall; 52.83190°N 1.42493°W	—	Late 18th century	The outbuilding is in red brick and stone, and has a tile roof with coped gables. It is partly in two storeys and partly in one, and has six bays. In the north front are two full height openings and slit vents, and in the south front are a segmental-headed doorway, a blocked full height opening, and a cross window.	II
Icehouse, Melbourne Hall Gardens; 52.81899°N 1.42015°W	—	Late 18th century	The icehouse is in brick, and has a semicircular front containing a door with a stone lintel. Inside, steps lead down to a domed well.	II
Pennfield House and outbuildings 52.82139°N 1.42831°W	—	Late 18th century	A house and an attached former lace factory in red brick on a stone plinth, with painted stone dressings, a dentilled eaves band, and a hipped slate roof. The house has three storeys and three bays, the outbuilding to the left has three storeys and five bays, and between them is a two-storey two-bay link. The house has a central doorway with a moulded surround, fluted jambs, and a projecting hood. The windows are sashes with rusticated wedge lintels and double keystones. In the former lace factory are segmental-headed windows and doorways, and a square-headed entry.	II
Pair of chest tombs 52.82229°N 1.42379°W	—	1788	Of the two chest tombs, the northern one is the older, and the southern tomb dates from the early 19th century. The northern tomb has panelled sides and ends with shaped balusters to the corners, and on the top is an inscribed slab with moulded edges. The southern tomb has plain sides and ends and raised corners, and is decorated on each side with semicircular-headed panels. On the top is a chamfered slab with moulded edges and an illegible inscription.	II
Shaw House; 52.81960°N 1.43912°W		1793	The house, which was extended in the 19th century, is in stuccoed red brick with stone dressings and a tile roof. The front range has a moulded cornice, and the rear range has a dentilled eaves band. There is an L-shaped plan, the front range with three storeys and four bays, and the older rear range with two storeys and three bays. On the front is a porch with Tuscan columns, a doorway with a traceried fanlight, and sash windows with cambered rusticated wedge lintels. To the north is a conservatory with a ridge lantern and iron cresting. In the rear wing is a segmental-headed doorway, and most of the windows are sashes with segmental heads.	II
43–57 Blanch Croft; 52.82320°N 1.43017°W	—	1795	A terrace of eight cottages stepped down a slope in pairs, in red brick and stone, with a dentilled eaves band and a slate roof. Each cottage has three storeys and a single bay, and it contains a doorway, and in each floor is a casement window. On the front is a semicircular-headed niche containing an inscribed and dated slate plaque. At the rear of each cottage is a workshop.	II
7 Blanch Croft; 52.82406°N 1.42918°W	—	c. 1800	A house and workshop in red brick with a slate roof. There are two storeys and two bays. On the front is a doorway and a window under a segmental arch, to the right is a horizontally sliding sash window with a segmental head, and to the left is a doorway and a window, both with a segmental head. In the upper floor are three three-light windows converted from a continuous window.	II
Elms Farmhouse; 52.83386°N 1.42240°W	—	1801–04	The farmhouse is in red brick on a stone plinth, with a stepped eaves band and a tile roof. There are two storeys and four bays. The doorway has a segmental head and a small-paned fanlight, to its right is canted bay window, and the other windows have segmental heads.	II
33 Derby Road and attached building 52.82443°N 1.42905°W	—	1810	A pair of houses on a corner site, one later used for other purposes, in red brick with painted stone dressings, a dentilled eaves band, and a tile roof. There are three storeys and a front of three bays. In the ground floor are two shop windows with moulded cornices, a doorway and a casement window. The middle floor contains casement windows, in the top floor are sash windows, and the left return contains doorways and sash windows. All the openings have incised wedge lintels with keystones.	II
35 Derby Road; 52.82452°N 1.42909°W	—	c. 1810	A red brick house with painted stone dressings, a sawtooth eaves band, and a tile roof. There are three storeys and three bays. In the centre is a doorway, and to its left is a moulded bootscraper with an ogee head. The windows are sashes, and all the openings have painted, panelled wedge lintels with keystones.	II
Common Farmhouse and walls 52.81215°N 1.42544°W	—	1817	The farmhouse is in red brick with painted stone dressings, a sawtooth band, and a tile roof. There are three storeys, a double range plan, and three bays. In the centre is a gabled rustic porch, and a doorway with a divided fanlight. The windows in the lower two floor are horizontally-sliding sashes, and the top floor contains casement windows. Attached to the sides of the house are low brick walls with flat stone copings, ending in rusticated stone piers with pyramidal copings. Between the piers are railings and a gate.	II
Former National School; 52.82126°N 1.42770°W	—	1821–22	The school, later used for other purposes, is in red brick with stone dressings, a dentilled eaves band, and a slate roof with stone coped gables. There are two storeys, five bays, and a later extension to the south. Steps lead up to a doorway with a pointed head and a chamfered surround, above it is an inscribed and dated plaque, and a pedimented gable containing a blocked circular window. The windows in the original part have pointed heads, Gothic tracery, and hood moulds, and in the extension they are sashes with segmental heads.	II
21 Blanch Croft; 52.82369°N 1.42962°W	—	Early 19th century	A red brick house with stone dressings, a dentilled eaves band, and a tile roof. There are two storeys and two bays. The main doorway has a moulded architrave, a deep lintel with three roundels, and a bracketed porch roof, and there is another doorway to the right with a quoined surround. Attached to base of door to the right is an ogee-headed stone bootscraper. In the ground floor are segmental-headed horizontally-sliding sash windows, and the upper floor contains casement windows with flat heads.	II
55–61 Castle Street; 52.82335°N 1.42518°W		Early 19th century	Two pairs of houses in red brick with stone dressings on a plinth, with dentilled eaves bands, and slate roofs. There are three storeys and each pair of houses has three bays. In the centre of each pair are three doorways in a Venetian window-style arrangement with a moulded surround, the middle door with a semicircular fanlight. Most of the windows are sashes, some have been replaced by top-hung casements, and all have rusticated wedge lintels.	II
63 Castle Street; 52.82344°N 1.42518°W	—	Early 19th century	A red brick house on a stone plinth, with painted stone dressings, a dentilled eaves band, and a tile roof. There are three storeys and a single bay. The doorway to the right has a rectangular traceried fanlight, and the windows are sashes. All the openings have rusticated wedge lintels with fluted keystones.	II
12 Church Street and brewery 52.82261°N 1.42757°W		Early 19th century	The house is in red brick on a rendered plinth, with a dentilled eaves band and a tile roof. There are three storeys and three bays. Steps lead up to the central doorway that has a rectangular fanlight and a cornice on consoles. The windows are sashes, those in the lower two floors with wedge lintels and keystones. The brewery buildings are at the rear, and are rendered, with three storeys, four bays, a canted plan, and an irregular front. The openings include doorways and windows, some with segmental heads, and a taking-in door.	II
47 Derby Road; 52.82477°N 1.42924°W	—	Early 19th century	A pair of cottages, later combined, in red brick, with painted stone dressings, a dentilled eaves band, and a slate roof. There are two storeys and two bays, and to the right is a segmental-headed arch into an alley. In the centre are two doorways with segmental heads. These are flanked by sash windows with wedge lintels and keystones, and in the upper floor are sash windows without lintels.	II
22–24 Market Place; 52.82271°N 1.42844°W	—	Early 19th century	A terrace of three cottages in red brick with painted stone dressings, a sawtooth eaves band, and a tile roof. There are two storeys and four bays. In the left bay is a doorway to a passage to the rear, on the front are doorways to the cottages, and the windows are sashes. All the openings have rusticated wedge lintels and keystones.	II
26 Market Place; 52.82267°N 1.42859°W	—	Early 19th century	A house and shop, possibly with an earlier core, it is in rendered brick on a stone plinth, with painted stone dressings, quoins, a sawtooth eaves band, and a tile roof. There are two storeys and three bays. To the left is a projecting 19th-century shop front with a moulded and dentilled cornice. On the right is a doorway with a traceried fanlight and a bracketed hood, and the windows are sashes. All the openings have wedge lintels and keystones.	II
Workshop behind 28A Market Place; 52.82288°N 1.42882°W	—	Early 19th century	The lace workshop is in red brick with a slate roof. There are two storeys, two bays, and a single-storey extension to the south. The workshop contains two segmental-headed doorways and two horizontally-sliding sash windows. On the east gable wall, external steps lead up to an upper floor doorway..	II
51, 53 and 55 Penn Lane; 52.82157°N 1.42842°W	—	Early 19th century	A terrace of four stone cottages with a stepped eaves band and a slate roof. There are two storeys, and each cottage has a single bay and a doorway with an entablature. In the centre is a through passage, with a blind window above. The windows are a mix of sashes and casements.	II
58–60 Potter Street; 52.82285°N 1.42560°W		Early 19th century	A house and a shop in red brick with painted stone dressings a dentilled eaves band and a slate roof. There are three storeys and two bays. In the ground floor is a shop front with pilasters and a moulded cornice, and to its right is a doorway with a fanlight, and the windows are sashes. All the openings have rusticated wedge lintels and keystones.	II
Chantry Barn and Chantry Stables; 52.83220°N 1.42404°W	—	Early 19th century	A threshing barn with two storeys and single-storey stables, converted into two houses in about 1980. They are in red brick and stone with a dentilled eaves band and tile roofs. There contain a full height opening, now glazed, slit vents and vents in diamond patterns, doorways and windows. Inside is the base of a cruck truss.	II
Cross House; 52.83225°N 1.42144°W		Early 19th century	The house is in rendered brick with a sill band and a tile roof. The central doorway has pilasters and a traceried fanlight, and the windows are sashes.	II
Grotto, Melbourne Hall Gardens; 52.81986°N 1.42109°W	—	Early 19th century	The grotto is in red brick covered in tufa, shells and marble, and consists of a low segmental-headed alcove. At the back is a small semicircular-headed marble niche over a small stone pool. Over the niche is a marble inscription.	II*
Outbuildings southeast of Kings Newton House; 52.83175°N 1.42154°W	—	Early 19th century	The outbuildings are in red brick on a stone plinth, with a dentilled eaves band and a tile roof. There are two storeys and seven bays. The middle bay is taller and gabled, and contains a depressed segmental arch, over which is a pigeon loft, and a dentilled pediment containing a circular opening. To the south is a three-bay barn and stables, and to its south is a stone wall containing two rusticated gate piers.	II
Outbuilding north of The Old Mill; 52.82033°N 1.42185°W		Early 19th century	The outbuilding is in stone, rendered on the west front, with quoins, and a tile roof with moulded gable copings. There is a single storey and attics, and a single bay. In the west front is a segmental-headed doorway, and the east front has a full-width opening with a timber lintel, and a timber post.	II
Outbuilding south of The Old Mill; 52.82008°N 1.42177°W	—	Early 19th century	The outbuilding is in rendered stone, and has a tile roof with moulded gable copings. There is a single storey and attics, and a single bay. In the west front is a segmental-headed doorway, and the east front has two segmental-headed doorways and a three-light window.	II
The Roebuck; 52.82295°N 1.42670°W		Early 19th century	The former public house is in painted red brick with painted stone dressings on a rendered plinth, and has a dentilled eaves band and a tile roof. There are three storeys and three bays, and a single-storey bay to the left. Steps lead up to the central doorway that has a segmental head, and it is flanked by bootscrapers. The windows are sashes with rusticated wedge lintels and keystones. The single bay to the left contains a full height segmental arch.	II
Vale House; 52.82135°N 1.42523°W	—	Early 19th century	A red brick house with painted dressings, a dentilled eaves band, and a tile roof. There are two storeys and three bays. In the centre is a later projecting porch with clasping pilasters, an entablature and blocking course, and a doorway with a divided fanlight. The windows are sashes with rusticated lintels and keystones.	II
The Dower House; 52.82097°N 1.42508°W		1829	A stone house with a moulded eaves cornice and a hipped slate roof. There are two storeys and four bays, and a later extension to the west. On the south front is a bay window with a moulded cornice and a blocking course, and sash windows. On the east front is a doorway with pilasters and a moulded cornice on carved consoles. At the rear is an initialled datestone.	II
40 High Street; 52.82262°N 1.42992°W	—	Early to mid 19th century	A house in red brick with sandstone dressings, a gutter cornice and a slate roof, hipped on the left. Thee are three storeys and a symmetrical front of three bays. In the centre is a porch with brick pilasters on stone bases, and stone capitals, a cornice, and a four-centred arch. The windows are sashes with painted wedge lintels, false voussoirs, and keystones.	II
Market lamp 52.82290°N 1.42507°W		1838	The lamp in Castle Street has a stepped stone plinth, and a square pedestal on which is a wide moulded slab. On the slab is an iron column carrying a lamp that has a scrolled base and a hooped surround. The pedestal has panelled sides, the western panel with an inscription.	II
Pool House and railings 52.81941°N 1.42152°W		1838	The house, later used for other purposes, has a stone front and red brick elsewhere, a moulded cornice, and a slate roof that has gables with pierced bargeboards and finials. There are two storeys and three gabled bays. The central doorway has a four-centred arch, incised spandrels, and a hood mould, and above it is an oriel window on moulded brackets. The other windows are mullioned with hood moulds, and in the gables are slit windows. The garden is enclosed by railings with fleur-de-lys finials, scrolled brackets, and stone corner piers with moulded cornices and pyramidal copings.	II
Boat House; 52.82056°N 1.42399°W		c. 1840	The boathouse is in stone, and has a tile roof with moulded stone coped gables. There is a single storey and a single bay. At the north end is a segmental-headed doorway with a hood mould, and the south end has a wide pointed arch with a hood mould.	II
St Michael's Vicarage; 52.82091°N 1.42382°W		1841–42	The vicarage, which is in Tudor style, is in stone on a plinth, and has tile roofs with moulded gable copings and moulded kneelers. There are two storeys, three bays, and later additions on each side. In the centre of the south front is a doorway with a four-centred arched head, to its left is a mullioned and transomed window. The right bay projects, it is gabled, and contains a canted bay window with an embattled parapet. The projecting addition to the east is pebbledashed and has a doorway with a segmental head, sash windows in the ground floor, and a casement window above, and the lean-to west addition contains small-paned casement windows.	II
Urn, Melbourne Hall Gardens; 52.82054°N 1.42008°W	—	1845	The urn at the east end of the Yew Tunnel is in stone, and stands on a pedestal with a moulded base and top, on a square plinth. The urn is cup-shaped, narrowing to a thin neck with a wide lip above, it has straight handles with scrolled tops on the sides, and a small plain lid.	II
Pair of metal basket flower beds, Melbourne Hall Gardens; 52.82124°N 1.42258°W	—	Mid 19th century	The raised square flower beds are in cast iron. Each flower bed is set in a shallow open frame, with crossing hooped iron bars above simulating wicker flower baskets.	II
Overflow system for Melbourne Pond; 52.81850°N 1.42086°W		19th century	The overflow system consists of a weir with a covered overflow head, and an underground chamber with an entrance from Melbourne Hall gardens. The eastern entrance has a stone front with a barrel vaulted tunnel behind, and a large chamber beyond. The overflow head is in stone and has a hipped roof and a small doorway.	II
Outbuilding west of Shaw House; 52.81965°N 1.43933°W	—	Mid 19th century	Stables and a loft, later used for other purposes, the building is in stone with quoins, a dentilled eaves band, and a tile roof. There are two storeys and three bays. In the ground floor are two doorways, one leading to an alley, and the upper floor contains horizontally-sliding sash windows.	II
Wesley Hall; 52.82307°N 1.42740°W		1853–54	The hall, which is in Italianate style, is in red brick with stone dressings on a plinth, and has rusticated quoins, bands, a moulded cornice, and a hipped slate roof. There are two storeys, four bays, and a southeast tower. On the front are two projecting porches, each with a semicircular doorway with rusticated jambs, a moulded arch with a keystone, and a door with a divided fanlight. The windows are sashes, and at the top of the front is an inscribed panel, and there are similar inscribed panels on the sides. The tower has rusticated pilaster strips, and panels with blocked circular openings with keystones, and paired round-headed windows.	II
Cemetery Chapels; 52.82924°N 1.42644°W		c. 1860	The chapels are in stone with roofs of grey and green slate and crested ridge tiles. There are two chapels at right angles, with a tower between them. Under the tower is a pointed carriage arch with a moulded surround, triple clustered shafts with moulded capitals, and a hood mould. The upper stage tapers to become octagonal, and has on two sides ogee-headed windows with crocketed hood moulds and finials, and above is a moulded cornice and gargoyles. On the top is an octagonal turret and a slim banded spire.	II
Gates and walls, Cemetery; 52.82912°N 1.42721°W	—	c. 1860	Flanking the entrance to the cemetery are rendered stone piers with triangular-sectioned copings and fleur-de-lys finials, and between them are iron gates. Extending from the piers are curved walls with decorative railings, ending in similar piers, the walls ramped up to the piers. The walls continue to run along the boundary of the cemetery on a chamfered plinth, and are stepped down in sections containing similar railings.	II
Railway bridge 52.84384°N 1.42387°W		1867	The bridge carries a former railway line over the River Trent, and is in cast iron with wooden decking and stone abutments. There are six rows of supports, each row having five columns with bracketed tops. The inner columns carry riveted plate girders, and the outer ones carry panels, lattice-work girders and pierced parapets.	II
United Reformed Church; 52.82249°N 1.42915°W		1870–71	The church is in stone, and has a slate roof with crested ridge tiles. It consists of a nave, north and south transepts, a chancel, and a small northeast steeple. The steeple has a tower with two stages, the lower stage containing a doorway with a pointed head and a lancet window, the upper stage becoming octagonal and surmounted by a spire. The front facing the street is gabled and has clasping buttresses, between which are a central triple lancet window and two single lancets, over which is a rose window.	II
Market Cross; 52.82285°N 1.42831°W		1889	The cross in Market Place was surrounded by a timber shelter in 1953. The cross is in stone, and has a square base surrounded by wooden benches. The base is moulded, and above it on three sides are blind semicircular niches with scalloped capitals, nook shafts, moulded arches, an impost band, and hood moulds. On the sides are an inscription and an inscribed brass plaque. Above is a moulded cornice and an octagonal spire with a lamp. The shelter has three posts on each side, and a hipped tile roof.	II
Thomas Cook Almshouses, chapel and railings 52.82219°N 1.43088°W		1891	The almshouses and chapel are in red brick with tile hanging, applied timber framing, terracotta dressings, and tile roofs with moulded gable copings. They form a U-shaped plan, with a central range of seven bays, the middle three bays projecting, and side ranges of four bays. The middle three bays have two storeys and attics, and contain an arcade of Tuscan columns. Above are mullioned and transomed windows, and in the jettied attics are mullioned windows, with an inscribed plaque below the middle window and a clock above. The flanking almshouses have a single storey and each has an attic with a gabled dormer. At the end of the left range is the former caretaker's house, and the right range ends in a chapel. On the roof of the chapel is a bellcote with an ogival leaded roof and between the ranges are railings and two sets of gates.	II
Leisure Centre and Library; 52.82223°N 1.42953°W		1897	A school, later used for other purposes, it is in red brick with dressings in stone and brick, and a tile roof with moulded gable copings, and moulded terracotta ridge vents. The building has a single storey with an attic, and a square plan, and on the roof is a tapering square cupola with a domed copper roof. The north front has a projecting gabled bay, flanked by lower wings containing projecting doorways, and in the angle between the central bay and the right wing is a three-stage tower with a domed copper roof. In the middle bay are three windows with moulded quoined surrounds, and a semicircular hood with a keystone over the central window. Above is a four-light mullioned and transomed window, and a shield in the gable. The doorways in the outer wings have semicircular heads, radiating quoins, and above are three-light mullioned windows and a shaped gable.	II
