= John Hair and Son =

English brewery

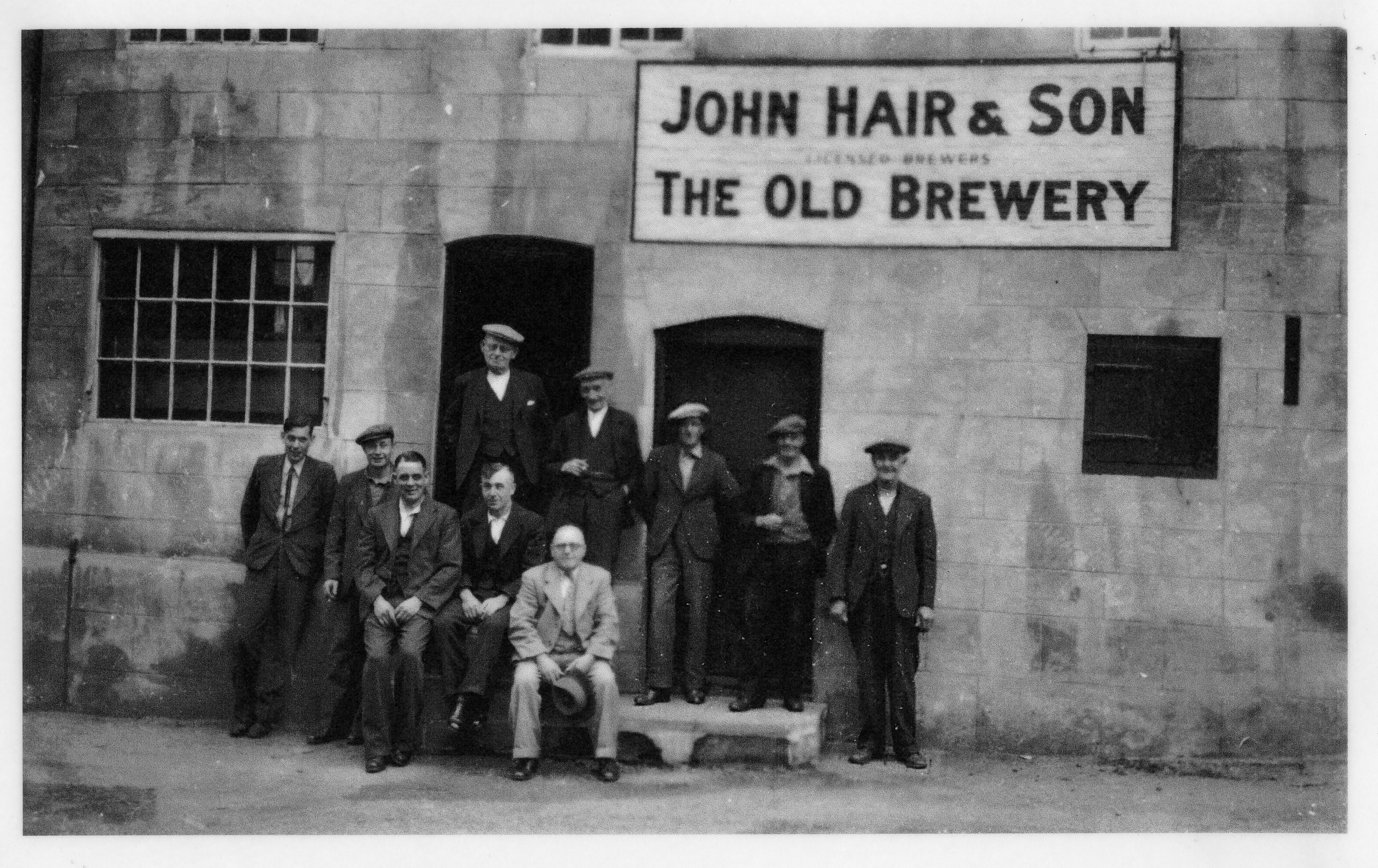
Customers Photographed Outside of the Brewery c. 1930s

John Hair and Son was an English brewer based in Melbourne, Derbyshire. It was founded in 1851, and acquired by Offiler's of Derby in 1954.

The original brewery buildings still exist in Church Street. It had one tied house and a small clubs trade in Derby. In 2016, the owners of the Chip and Pin micropub hoped they would be able to source the original Hair recipe and bring the beer back into production but were unable to.
