= Chellaston Academy =

Academy in Chellaston, Derbyshire, England

Location
- Swarkestone Road; 52°51′58″N 1°26′22″W; Chellaston, Derby, Derbyshire, DE73 5UB; England

Information
- Type: Academy
- Motto: Integrity, Care, Excellence
- Established: 1977
- Trust: Tapestry Learning Partnership
- Department for Education URN: 136360 Tables
- Ofsted: Reports
- Chair of Governors: A Wetherford
- Principal: Damian Leese
- Gender: Coeducational
- Age: 11 to 18
- Enrolment: 1847
- Capacity: 1650
- Houses: Alport (red), Eldon (yellow), Thorpe (purple), Kinder (blue), Stanage (orange)
- Colours: Green, white, black
- Trust UID: 17218
- Trust Partners: Chellaston Junior School, Homefields Primary School, Chellaston Infant School
- Website: www.chellaston.derby.sch.uk

Chellaston Academy (formerly Chellaston Foundation School) is a comprehensive school and Academy in Chellaston in the Derby area of England, United Kingdom. In 2019 the academy partnered with Chellaston Junior School, Chellaston Infant School and Homefields primary to form the coeducational Peak Multi Academy Trust (PSM). Phill Smith was appointed headteacher in September 2023.

Its catchment area traditionally includes Chellaston, Aston-on-Trent, Weston-on-Trent, Melbourne, Ticknall, Barrow upon Trent and other areas of South Derbyshire. Pupils' ages range from 11-year-olds in year 7, through to [ adults in the sixth form college.

== Background information ==
The school opened in 1977 and its sixth form is the largest in Derby. In 2005, the school had a total of 1,580 students. The official capacity is now 1,650, though the school is oversubscribed.

The school officially became an Academy on 1 December 2010.

The school introduced a house system in November 2017, consisting of five houses, named after peaks within Derbyshire.

== History ==
The first build of the school started in 1975 and was finished in 1977, providing 450 places for students, and the second build, completed in November 1978, created another 300 places. In September 1994, an extension to the technology block was completed, facilitating the options of Art, Design, Wet and Dry Textiles along with other such technology facilities, while the Performing Arts Studio (in the main block) was converted from the Lecture Theatre.

A £2.21m Sixth form Centre was opened in September 1995. Simultaneously, the library was extended.

In 1997, the school was further extended to accommodate the growing number of students wanting to attend. A specialised, temporary Mathematics block was completed, containing eight classrooms. The sports hall was also completed. The Humanities block was built in 2000 along with another four science labs in a new building (loosely specialised for the teaching of biology), separate from the existing science block. In January 2003, the Humanities block was substantially extended, adding a Refectory (functioning as a substitute to the Main Hall as a canteen) and a large new IT suite.

In September 2004, the Music and Drama block was built in order to accommodate the increasing applicants, allowing the school to hold approximately 1,700 students. Traditionally, the school catering was managed by the in-school catering team. However, in 2009 the management of student meals was outsourced to an independent company, as part of the Chellaston Academy Healthy Schools Programme. The construction of three new laboratories has recently been completed in September 2011, increasing the number of classrooms in the Science Block. Recently added has been an extension to the sports hall and an addition to the music and drama block providing a theatre for students to perform at events throughout the year.

In mid-2016, A new £2,000,000 Mathematics block was added in replacement of the older, outdated one. This building has now been completed and features both mathematics and English classrooms and a dining area.

== Academics ==
The school works a 50-hour, two-week timetable on a comprehensive principal. In Key Stage 3, no child does a reduced curriculum. French and Spanish are taught, though two hours a fortnight can be diverted to literacy and English catchup.

From the results in year 7, 8 and 9 pupils are banded to an academic yellow band following Ebacc subjects or a more vocational white band.

Ofsted visited the school in 2019, three days after a member of staff had been arrested on over a serious breach of trust, Ofsted did not examine the incident but did consider the senior managements response. Ofsted considered all areas in Key Stage 3 and 4 were good, but was concerned about monitoring and safeguarding in the sixth form, Key Stage 5. They mentioned the unmonitored absences in Year 12, and the amount of unsupervised work experience but were still impressed by the teaching standard and the outcomes the students achieved.

== Chellaston Uganda Project ==
Since 2006 Chellaston Academy has been raising money to fund materials used by the students and staff who fly to Uganda to repair/improve an orphanage known as the John Dickins House. This building facility aims to provide clean water, food and shelter to children of Uganda who have no parents and are living in the streets.

Every year until 2020 some sixth form students and staff would fly over to the country and spend a month there. As well as building the orphanage, the students engaged in activities from bungee jumping and white water rafting, to visiting homes created for the disabled. They spent time bonding and socialising with the children who lived in the orphanage.
