= St Michael with St Mary's Church, Melbourne =

St Michael with St Mary’s Church, Melbourne
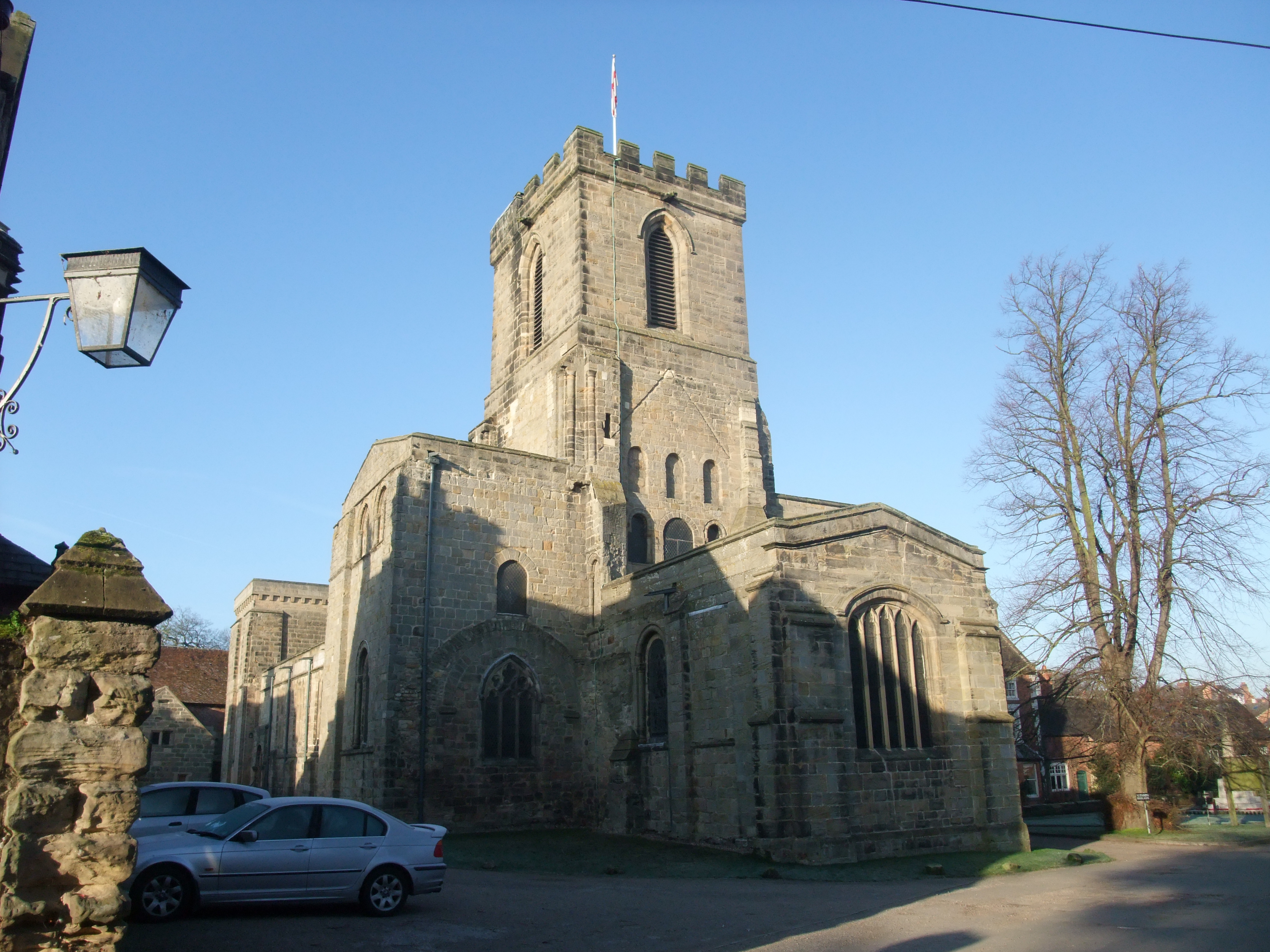
- St Michael with St Mary’s Church, Melbourne
- St Michael with St Mary’s Church, Melbourne
- 52°49′15.45″N 1°25′27.12″W
- Location: Melbourne, Derbyshire
- Country: England
- Denomination: Church of England
- Website: melbourneparishchurch.org.uk

History
- Dedication: St Michael and St Mary

Architecture
- Heritage designation: Grade I listed

Specifications
- Length: 144 feet (44 m)

Administration
- Diocese: Diocese of Derby
- Archdeaconry: Derby
- Deanery: Melbourne
- Parish: Melbourne

St Michael and St Mary's Church, Melbourne is a Grade I listed parish church in the Church of England in Melbourne, Derbyshire.

== History ==
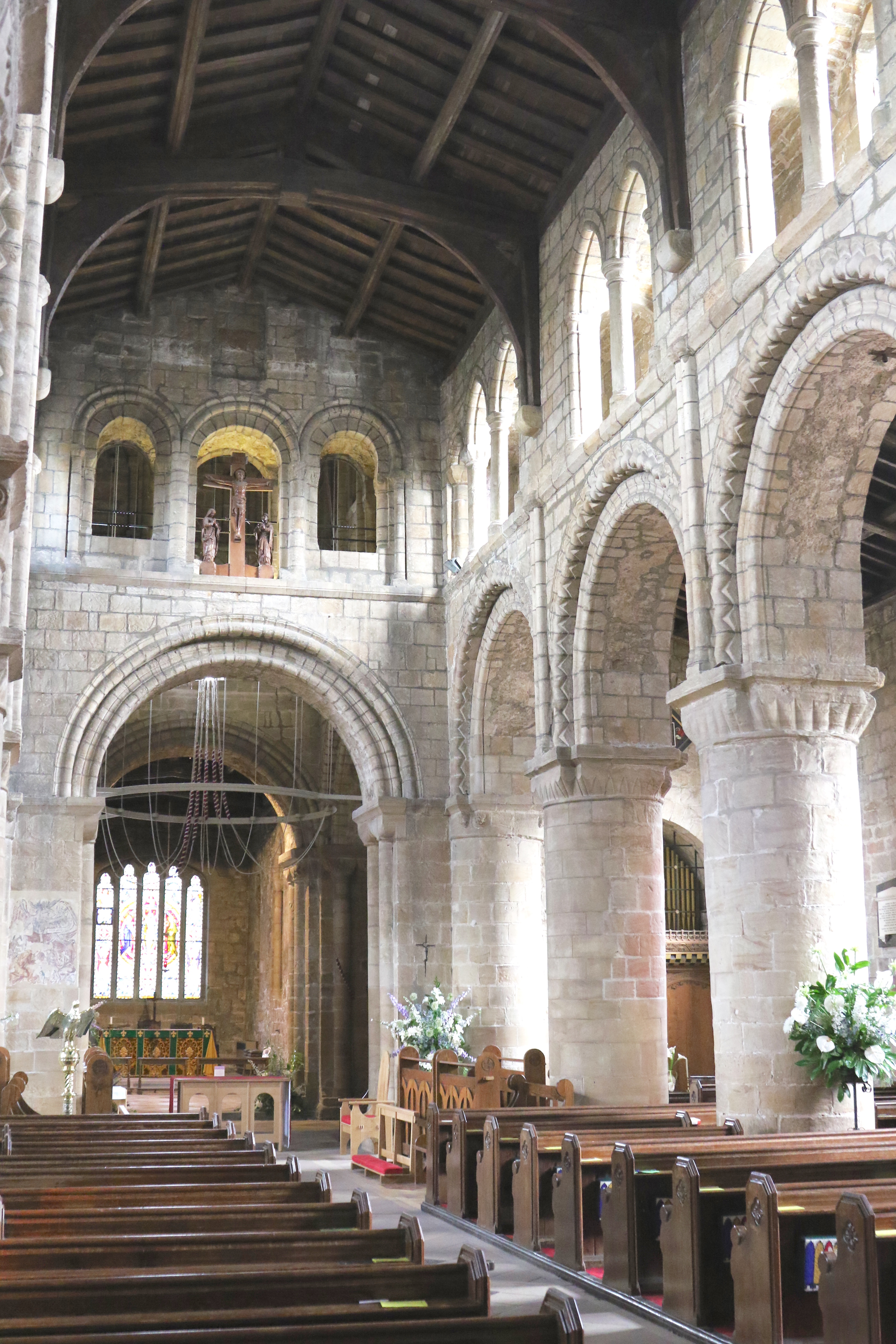
Nave of the church, showing the ringing ropes in the tower crossing

The church is medieval and existed when the Domesday Book was compiled in 1086. The current building dates from the early part of the 12th century when the living of Melbourne was given to the Bishop of Carlisle. Due to its episcopal connections, the cruciform church is one of the grandest parochial examples of Norman architecture in England. The original design included three towers, a feature generally only seen on great cathedrals and abbeys. The building was later altered, with the apse and transept chapels being removed and the aisles rebuilt with larger windows.

It was restored by Sir George Gilbert Scott between 1859 and 1862. It was closed for one year at the start of the restoration in 1859 and reopened on 3 November 1860, when enough work had been completed to allow the congregation to use the building. The interior was renovated. The aisles were floored with red and white Mansfield stone laid in a diamond pattern. The chancel was laid with Minton encaustic tiles. A new pulpit and reading desk were installed. The wall plaster was removed and the stonework revealed. The west front stonework was renewed.

== Parish status ==
The church is in a joint parish with:

- St James' Church, Smisby
- St Michael's Church, Stanton by Bridge
- St George's Church, Ticknall

== Vicars of Melbourne ==
The names of the Vicars are found in the Episcopal Register of Lichfield, in extracts from the deeds in the Melbourne Hall Muniment Room made by Mr. W.D. Fane and in the Parish Church Registers dating from 1054.

- Magister Henry de Meleburn
- 1202 Magister Henry de Derby
- 1208 Magister Simon de Waltham
- 1216 Gherardus de Rhodes
- 1278 Ricardus de Stanton
- Gregory
- 1332 Ricardus
- 1349 John de Lechuard
- 1392 William Colverdowse
- 1410 William de Boyleston
- William Sandys
- 1438 Thomas Marchall
- 1438 John Kyrkeby
- 1440 Robert Dawson
- 1456 Henry Cardemaker
- 1459 Hugo Fayreclogh
- 1482 William Saunders
- 1514 John Reed
- 1534 Robert James
- 1535 John Dawson
- 1553 Giles Robinson
- 1558 Robert Greene
- 1586 Richard Ward
- 1617 Richard Jones
- 1639 Richard Loe
- 1640 Nicholas Claget
- 1647 William Paske
- 1663 James Vicars
- 1670 Thomas Littell
- 1690 John Troughton
- 1718 Cornelius Sutton
- 1732 John Ward
- 1756 George Sinclair
- 1775 Henry Robinson
- 1784 John Middleton
- 1831 Joseph Deans
- 1888 John Joseph Singleton
- 1908 Leonard Philip Robin
- 1919 Edward Thomas Harcom
- 1935 Robert John Morris DSO
- 1954 Robert Ralph Honner
- 1972 Ronald William Trevor Moore
- 1981 Frederick Ross
- 1999 John Harverd Davies
- 2011 Mark Powell

== Organ ==
The church contains a pipe organ by Bevington and Sons dating from the 1860s, subsequently modified by Kingsgate Davidson and Co in 1956 and Nicholson & Co (Worcester) Ltd in 1981. A specification of the organ can be found on the National Pipe Organ Register.

== See also ==
- Grade I listed churches in Derbyshire
- Grade I listed buildings in Derbyshire
- Listed buildings in Melbourne, Derbyshire
