= Robert Bakewell (ironsmith) =

English smith (1682–1752)

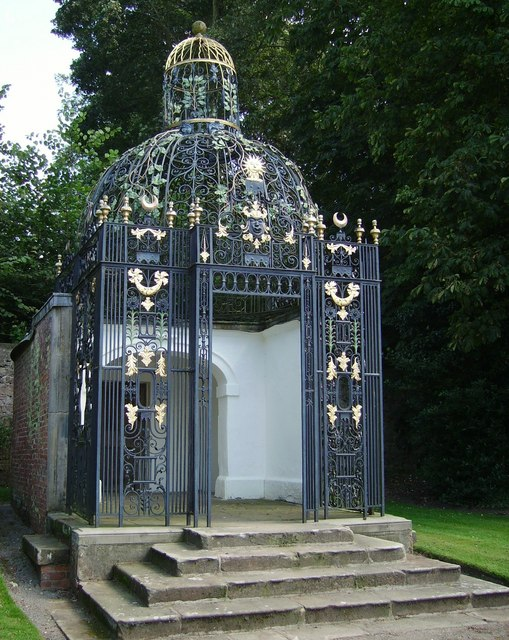
The arbour at Melbourne Hall

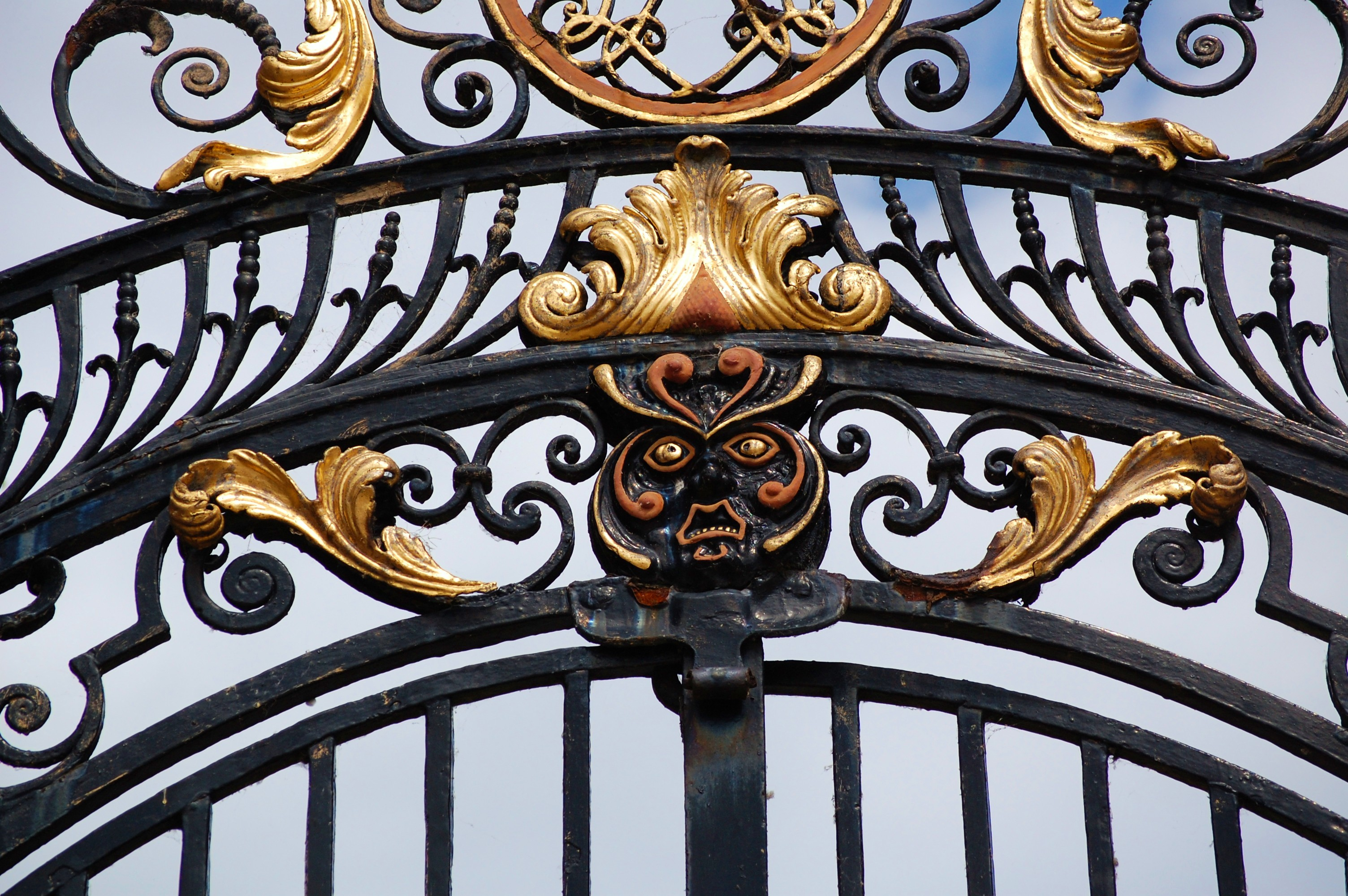
The Silk Mill gates in Derby (now Derby Industrial Museum)

Robert Bakewell (1682–1752) was an English smith. He took an apprenticeship in London as an iron worker and became an extremely skilled ironsmith.

== Life ==
He was born in Uttoxeter, Staffordshire, in 1682. In 1706 he started working at Melbourne Hall for Thomas Coke while living in the town of Melbourne. In the gardens at the hall, a wrought iron arbour created by Bakewell can still be seen today: it is known locally as 'the Birdcage'.

Following an affair with local woman Elizabeth Fisher, which resulted in the birth of a son, Bakewell Fisher, he moved from Melbourne to Derby, where he set up a workshop and forge at Oake's Yard in St Peter's Street. Later, he married Mary Cokayne and had a family of three sons and three daughters. He died in 1752 and is buried in St Peter's Church, Derby.

Examples of his work can be seen at Derby Cathedral, where he made the wrought iron rood screen and the gates at the west door. There are also wrought iron gates by Bakewell at the Derby Industrial Museum, and ironwork by him in a number of churches in Derbyshire towns and villages: Alvaston, Ashbourne, Borrowash, Duffield, Etwall, Foremark, Radbourne. In Leicestershire at Staunton Harold church, a metal screen by Bakewell can be seen.
