= George Lewis Coke =

English gentleman and landowner

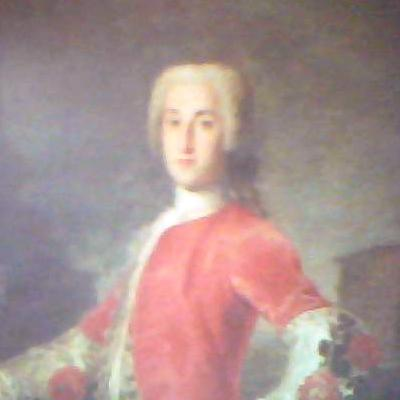
- portrait by Pompeo Batoni
- Born: 1715; Derbyshire
- Died: 1751 (aged 35–36) prob. Melbourne, Derbyshire
- Education: Christ Church, Oxford
- Occupation: Gentleman
- Parent: Thomas Coke

George Lewis Coke (1715–1751) of Melbourne Hall, Melbourne, Derbyshire was an English gentleman and landowner.

== Biography ==
George Lewis Coke was born in 1715 to Thomas Coke and his wife Mary (née Hale). His father had been Vice-Chamberlain of the Household to Queen Mary and George I and briefly (in 1704) Teller of the Receipt of the Exchequer.

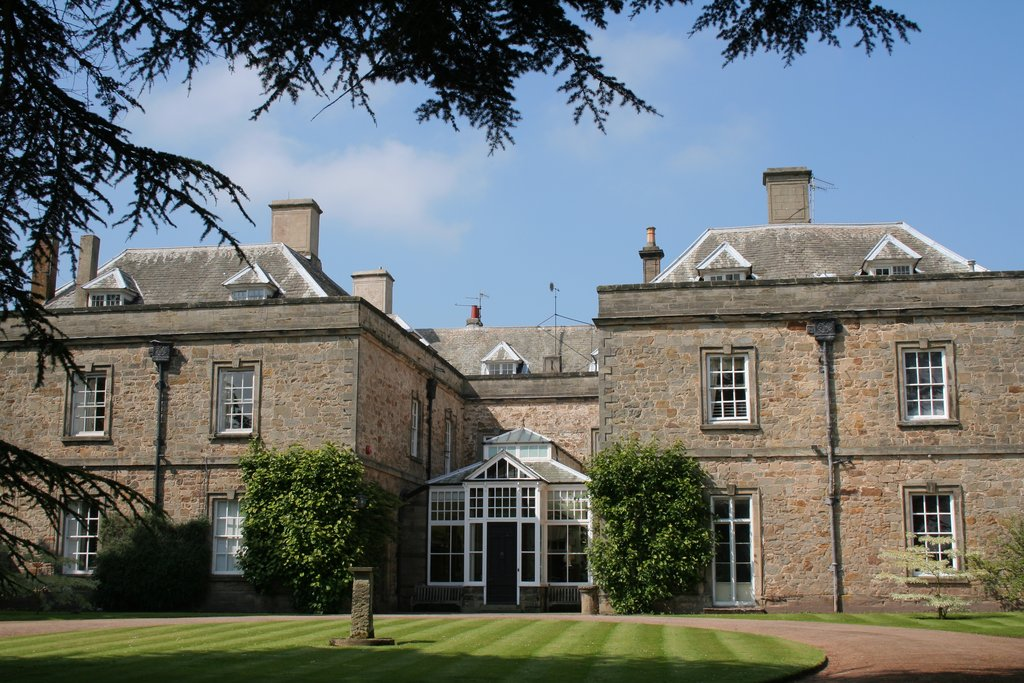
Melbourne Hall, Derbyshire

His father died when he was twelve and he was taken care of by his uncle, John Coke, in London. He matriculated at Christ Church, Oxford in 1732, and property at Kings Newton was purchased for him by his uncle. He also inherited his father's property at Melbourne, Derbyshire.

When Coke was nineteen he embarked on the traditional Grand Tour of Europe, despite being appointed Surveyor-General of His Majesty's Customs two years before when he was just 17. In the first year he visited Paris and ?? after staying over the winter in Montpelier, he visited Rome, Venice. Whilst in Italy he had his portrait painted by the Italian painter, Pompeo Batoni – who made a good living from young English aristocrats. Like other Grand Tour portraits, Coke appears amongst antiquities. In this case the Coliseum is in the background of Batoni's composition. When Coke returned from abroad he was accompanied by a "companion and tutor" known as John Lewis Pasteur.

Between 1742 and 1745, Coke hired William Smith to remodel the gardens of Melbourne Hall which, together with rebuilding the front and east wing, completed the plans of his father who had died prematurely.

In 1745 a key event happened in British History when Bonnie Prince Charlie travelled with Scottish supporters south towards London to claim the throne of England. The troops made it as far as Swarkestone Bridge which takes the road between Derby and Melbourne over the River Trent. A source says, the Deputy Lieutenant and the monarch's representative in the county in 1745 was George Lewis Coke.

On his death in 1751, his property went to his sister, Charlotte, who had married the family lawyer, Sir Matthew Lamb, 1st Baronet, and was to become grandmother to William Lamb, 2nd Viscount Melbourne, the Victorian Prime Minister.

Coke's companion, Pasteur, lived until the year 1793 after marrying and having three children in England and paying the Hearth Tax on the hall in 1777, over twenty years after Coke's death.

== Afterwards and alternatively ==
In 1860, the fabric of Melbourne church was restored and this involved the removal of "hundreds of skulls"; the first coffin to be removed was that of George Lewis Coke which was unusual in shape. This was recorded by the local historian John Joseph Briggs who also noted the story about his valet, John Lewis Pasteur. According to Briggs, Coke had returned from abroad in the coffin, 109 years before, with Pasteur as valet. It was Pasteur who went on to be a shepherd in Bredon. Briggs indicates that Coke never returned alive from his foreign tour and that his coffin was of "foreign" construction. Others agree with Briggs and say that "J.L.Pasteur" set out on the journey with him.
