= June Berry =

British artist

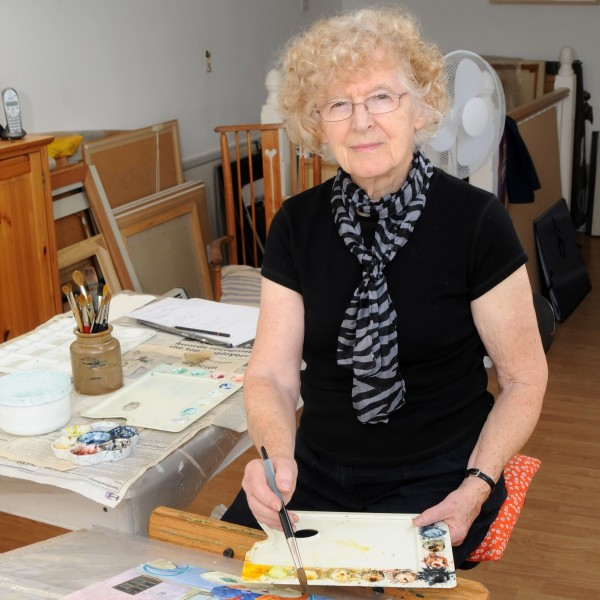
- Berry, 2020
- Born: 10 August 1924 (age 102); Melbourne, Derbyshire, England
- Education: Slade School of Fine Art
- Known for: Watercolour painting
- Website: juneberry.co.uk

June Berry (born 10 August 1924) is a British artist, originally from Melbourne in Derbyshire.

== Life and career ==
Berry studied painting at the Slade School of Fine Art in London. She has had nineteen solo exhibitions including a retrospective at the Bankside Gallery, London in 2002. Her paintings have been exhibited frequently at the Royal Academy Summer Exhibition, London since 1952. Berry was Vice-President of the Royal Watercolour Society from 2001 to 2004 and is also a member of the Royal Society of Painter-Printmakers, the New English Art Club and is a Royal West of England Academician.

Examples of Berry's work are included in the collections of HM the Queen, the British Government Art Collection, the Victoria & Albert Museum, London, the National Museum Wales, the collection of the Royal West of England Academy, the Graphothek in Berlin and the All Union Society of Bibliophiles in Moscow. Her work has also been purchased by many private collectors in the UK, USA, Germany and Russia.

Kate Nelson in the Eastern Daily Press relates how Berry "wowed judges of a national competition" in 2008 when she was a finalist in The Sunday Times watercolour competition of that year. She was also a highly commended finalist in the Sunday Times competition in 2011. She is described in an article by Pat Harvey in The Artist "as one of the treasures of British contemporary art".
