= Melbourne, Derbyshire =

Market town in Derbyshire, England

Coordinates: 52.823°N 1.429°W

Melbourne
- Market town
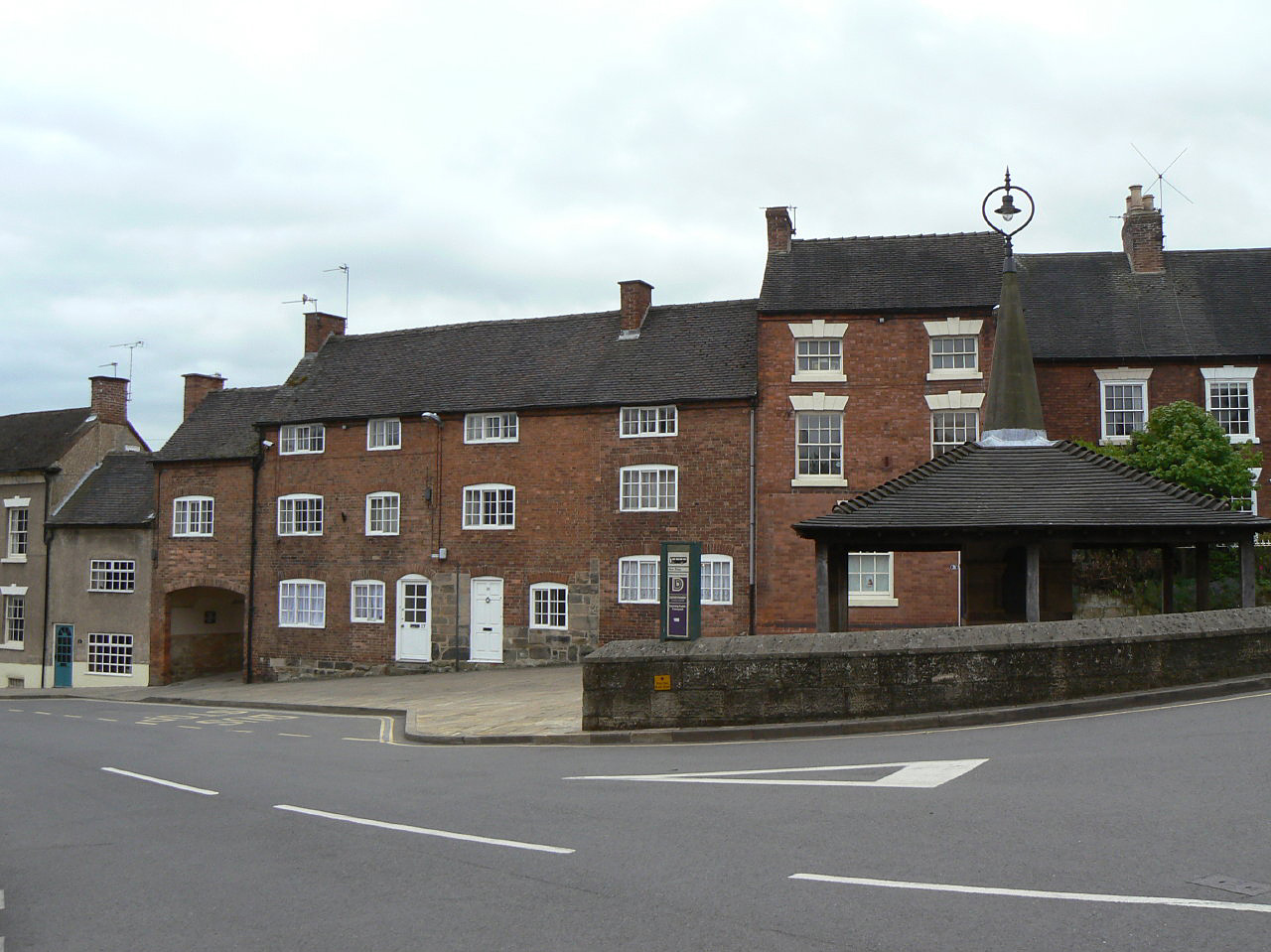
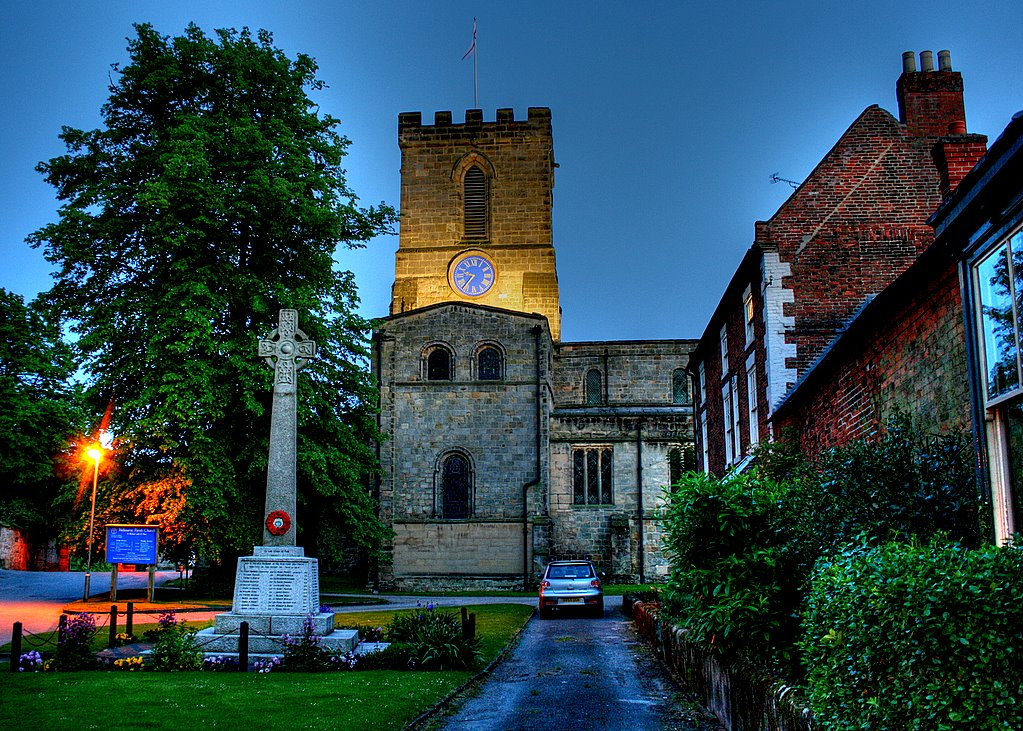
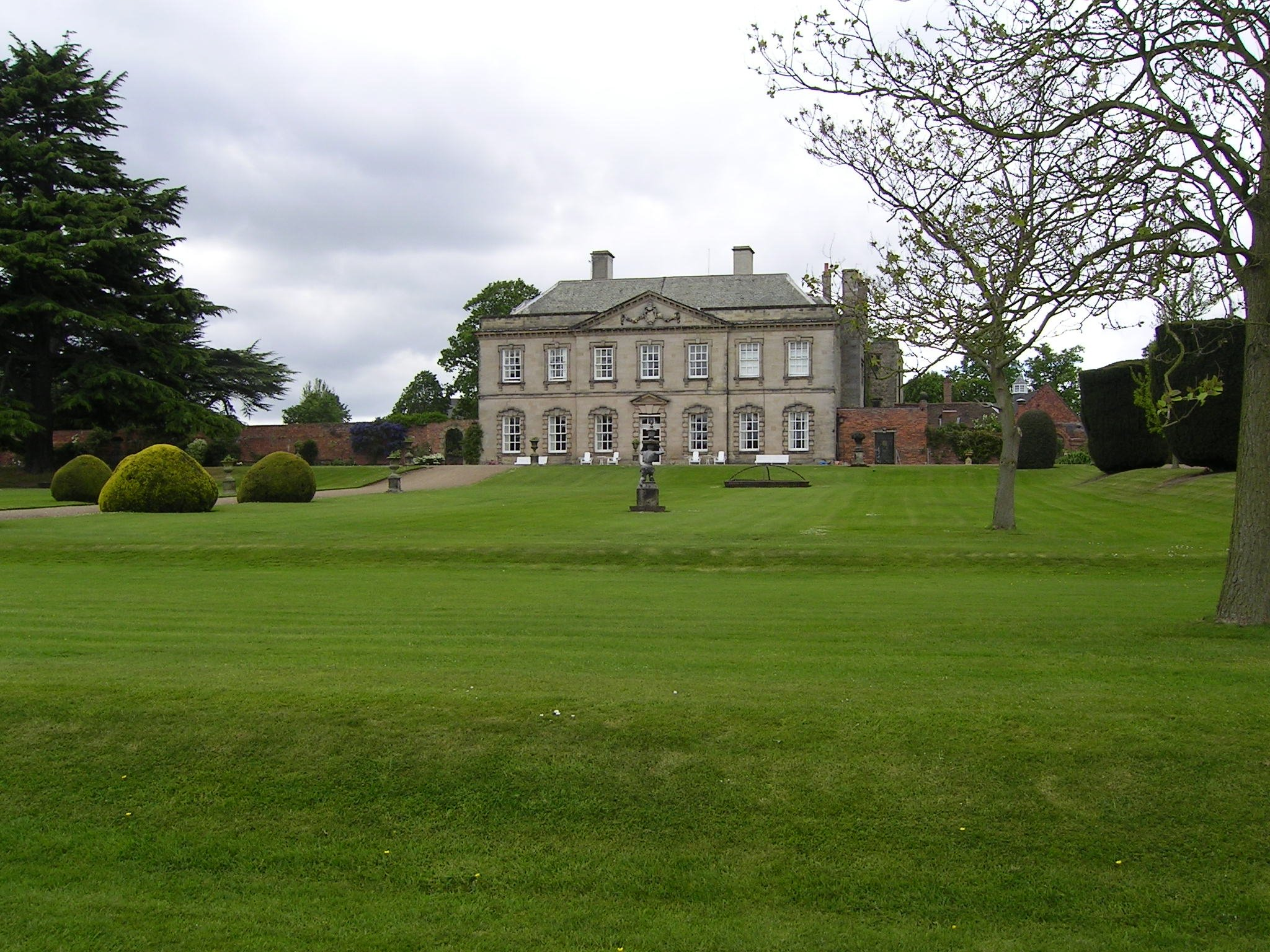
- Market Place St Michael’s Church Melbourne Hall

- Location within Derbyshire
- Area: 14.73 km^{2} (5.69 sq mi)
- Population: 5,264 (2021 Census)
  - Density: 925.57
- OS grid reference: SK385255
- District: South Derbyshire
- Shire county: Derbyshire
- Region: East Midlands
- Country: England
- Sovereign state: United Kingdom
- Post town: DERBY
- Postcode district: DE73
- Dialling code: 01332
- Police: Derbyshire
- Fire: Derbyshire
- Ambulance: East Midlands
- UK Parliament: South Derbyshire
- Website: https://www.melbourneparishcouncil.gov.uk/

Melbourne (/ˈmɛlbɔːrn/) is a market town and civil parish in South Derbyshire, England. It was home to Thomas Cook, founder of the eponymous travel agency, and has a street named after him. It is 8 miles (13 km) south of Derby and 2 miles (3 km) from the River Trent. The population of the civil parish at the 2021 Census was 5,264.

== Toponymy ==
The name Melbourne means "mill stream", i.e. the mill by the stream. It was first recorded in Domesday Book (DB 1086 Mileburne = mill stream) as a royal manor.

Through William Lamb, 2nd Viscount Melbourne, Melbourne is the namesake of the Australian city.

== History ==
A Church of England parish church building dates from around 1120.

In 1311, Robert de Holand fortified the existing royal manor house to form Melbourne Castle, though the fortification was never completed. Jean, duc de Bourbon, the most important French prisoner taken at the Battle of Agincourt (1415), was detained at the castle for 19 years. In the 16th century, plans were mooted to imprison Mary, Queen of Scots there, but it had deteriorated into a poor state of repair.

Melbourne Hall, originally owned by the church, was constructed in stages, mainly in the 17th and 18th centuries. It gave its name to the Melbourne viscounts and thence indirectly to the cities of Melbourne, the capital city of Victoria, Australia, and Melbourne, Florida, in the United States.

In 1739, Lady Elizabeth Hastings, daughter of the Earl of Huntingdon, left funds for a charity school in Melbourne in her will.

The Melbourne line operated during the Second World War as a military training railway, for engineers to practise the demolition and rebuilding of railways and the running and maintenance of a railway line and its rolling stock.. It was situated to the north of the now defunct Melbourne railway station.

Since 2005, Melbourne has run an arts festival every September.

== Places of interest ==
The parish church, St Michael with St Mary's, has been described as a "cathedral in miniature". The Domesday Book records a church and priest here in 1086. The present church was built about 1120, and most of the original masonry is intact, except for the eastern end which has been refurbished. The roofs, naves, aisles and the aisle windows date from the restoration of the 1630s. A restoration was carried out by Gilbert Scott in 1859–62. There are several other churches in the town.

Melbourne Church

Melbourne Hall was originally the rectory for the Bishop of Carlisle, but was substantially rebuilt by Thomas and George Coke in the early 18th century. The hall's gardens were laid out with the assistance of royal gardeners in 1704. They contain examples of the work of Derby ironsmith Robert Bakewell. Melbourne Pool was originally used by the nearby mill. The hall is open to the public in August.

The Thomas Cook Memorial Cottages in High Street were built by Thomas Cook, who started popular travel in England. Cook was born in Melbourne in 1808 though his birthplace was demolished in 1968. The buildings built in 1890–91 include fourteen cottages, a bakehouse, a laundry and mission hall. They still provide accommodation for some of Melbourne's senior citizens.

The Market Place is the location of Melbourne's main shops, including the ornate building previously housing the Co-op. A market cross, built in 1889, had a bus shelter added in 1953, making it a natural gathering place as the town's primary public transport stop.

== Education ==
Melbourne has two schools: an infant school and a junior school, sharing a single site on Packhorse Road. It is also in the catchment area of Chellaston Academy, with buses provided by Harpur's Coaches and Hawkes Travel, and is close to The Pingle Academy and Castle Donington College.

== Sport ==
The town plays host to Melbourne Rugby Football Club, Melbourne United Football Club, Melbourne Town Cricket Club, Melbourne Royal British Legion Tug of War Club and RAMcc (Ride Around Melbourne Cycling Club). There is also a popular, free entry recreation ground, which holds MTCC, MRFC and MUFC fixtures on a regular basis. There is also a modern sports pavilion, designed by Heath Avery Architects, which will contain changing rooms and toilets, and a desk where people interested in booking out the newly developed astro-turf pitches can book. There were formerly two bowls clubs in the village: Kings Newton Bowls Club on Packhorse Road, and Melbourne Bowls Club; the latter has now closed. Melbourne is close to Donington Park racing circuit, which hosted the 1993 European Grand Prix, and today hosts the British Superbike Championship, British Touring Car Championship, British GT Championship, and the Rowe Britcar Endurance Championship among many other national and club-level racing championships in both cars and bikes.

== Culture, industry and transport ==
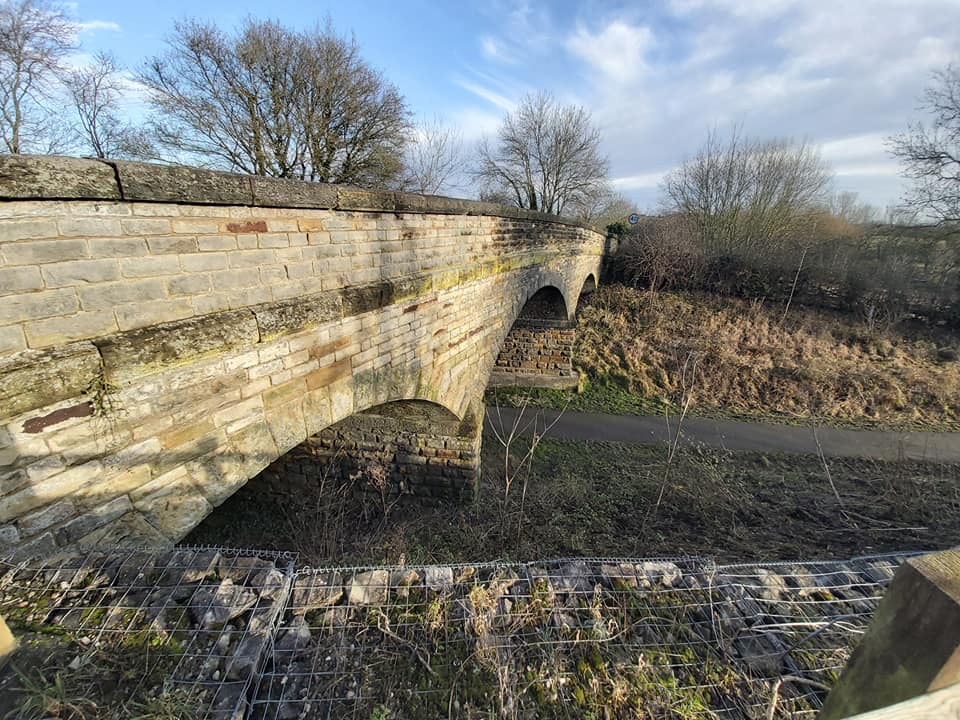
The former Melbourne Line near Melbourne station. Now a footpath. Station Road, Melbourne passes over the line

The town and the neighbouring village of Kings Newton, were served by a station on the former Melbourne Line between 1868 until 1930. The station became an army-only line until 1945, when it was returned to the London, Midland and Scottish Railway. The line closed to all freight traffic in 1980, when the line was in decline. The tracks remained in situ until 1988, when Derbyshire County Council bought the track from British Rail and converted the section from Chellaston to Worthington via Melbourne into a footpath. The station site was cleared, apart from the station master's house which remains as a private residence.

The town contains many Georgian buildings and in the 19th century was a centre for framework knitting and footwear manufacture, e.g. Fairystep Shoes. Market gardens have always been a major part of the economy, though now only a handful remain. John Hair's brewery operated in Church Street from 1851 to 1954.

East Midlands Airport, 5 miles (8 km) to the east of the town, was opened in the 1960s and has become a significant regional transport hub. The town's bus service is run by Arriva Midlands. Previously, Trent Barton maintained a small garage in Melbourne, the site going on to become a supermarket. It maintained routes to Swadlincote, Derby, Aston-on-Trent and Weston-on-Trent. Bus services for pupils run to Chellaston Academy every morning and afternoon. In October 2019 Midland Classic Buses introduced a bus link to East Midlands Airport and Ashby de la Zouch and a fast route to Swadlincote via an extension of its route 9 service, now known as airline 9.

There is a wide range of shops and services including a Sainsbury's supermarket, ATMs, a post office, a pharmacy, a library, the Melbourne Assembly Rooms (formerly the Bill Shone Leisure Centre), a youth club and several pubs and restaurants.

In March 2013, Melbourne was ranked as the 15th best town in Britain to live in by The Times newspaper; the annual Melbourne Festival was also named as one of the Top 10 British Craft Events by Country Living. In April 2013, Melbourne became the first town in Derbyshire to receive Walkers are Welcome Town status.

Melbourne Hall hosts regular comedy evenings, and its grounds have hosted Johnny Vegas' Field of Dreams glamping site since 2023, featured on Channel 4.

There is a wide variety of historic pubs and restaurants in the village, including The White Swan which has been serving customers since 1682.

Regular community events are held at the Melbourne Junior School playing fields, including an annual carnival and, in 2023, a celebration of the Coronation of Charles III and Camilla.

Nearby Donington Park hosts the annual Download Festival, which attracts many visitors to the town of Melbourne.

== Media ==
Local news and television programmes are provided by BBC East Midlands and ITV Central. Television signals are received from the Waltham TV transmitter.

Local radio stations are BBC Radio Derby, Capital East Midlands, Smooth East Midlands, Hits Radio East Midlands and Greatest Hits Radio Midlands.

The town is served by the local newspaper Village Voice.

== Notable residents ==
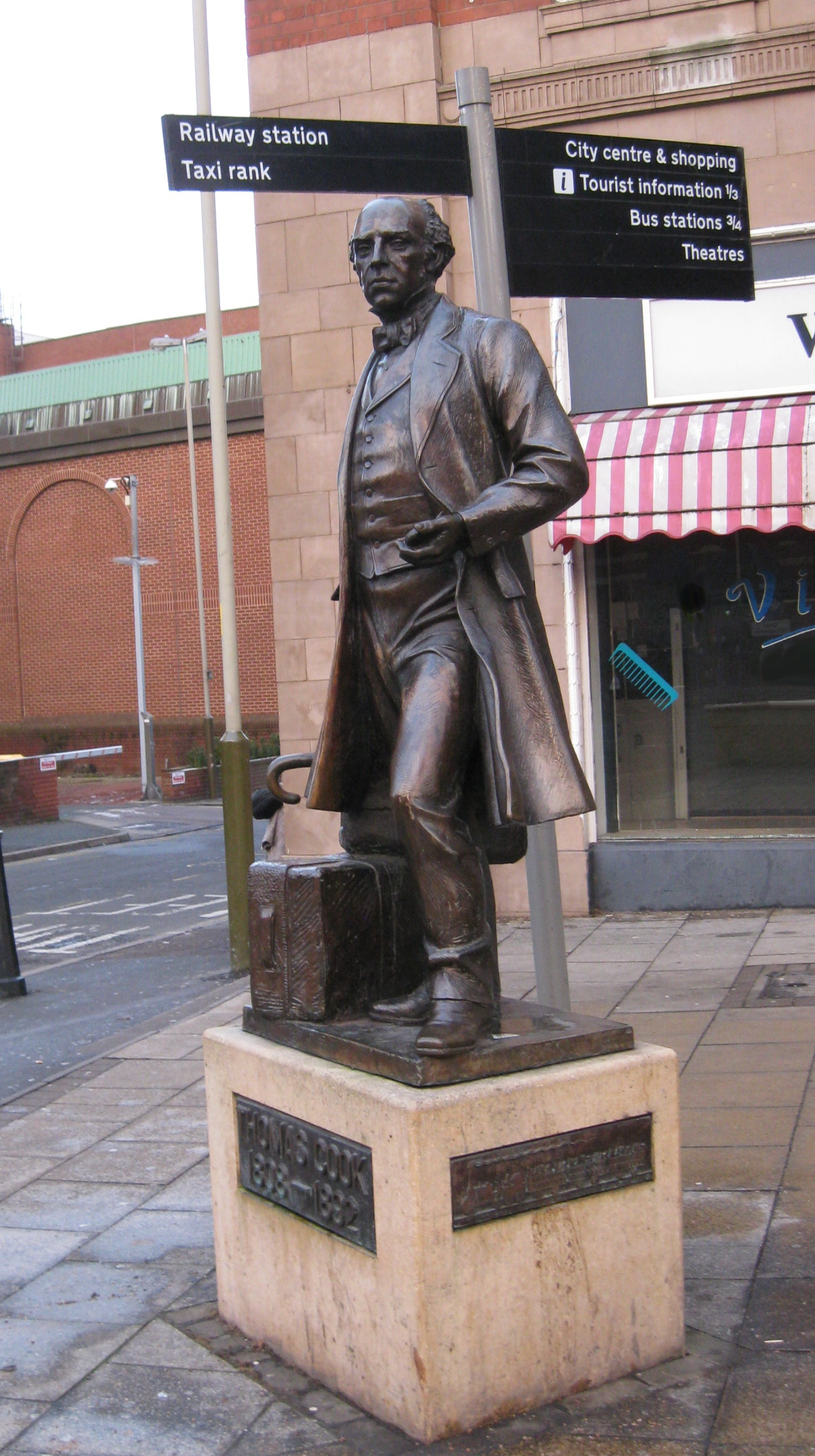
statue of Thomas Cook in Leicester, 2013

- John Coke (c. 1653–1692), from Melbourne Hall, politician and MP for Derby between 1685 and 1689.
- Thomas Coke (1674–1727), of Melbourne Hall, an English courtier and MP between 1698 and 1715.
- Robert Bakewell (1682–1752), ironsmith, started his career here in 1706.
- George Lewis Coke (1715–1751), from Melbourne Hall, an English gentleman and landowner.
- William Lamb, 2nd Viscount Melbourne (1779–1848), eponymous prime minister, in 1834 & 1835–1841.
- Thomas Cook (1808–1892), founded travel agency Thomas Cook & Son was born here
- William Dexter (1818–1860), an English-Australian painter.
- John Joseph Briggs (1819–1876), naturalist, lived in Kings Newton and published a History of Melbourne.
- Rowland Ordish (1824–1886), civil engineer, designed and built the Albert Bridge, London.
- Christopher Wilson (1874-1919), British composer and conductor, best known for his theatre music.
- Ronald Pope (1920–1997), an English sculptor and artist.
- June Berry (born 1924), British Watercolour painter, studied at Slade School of Fine Art
- Angela Piper (born ca.1945), actress, portrayed Jennifer Aldridge in the BBC radio drama The Archers

=== Sport ===
- John Young (1876–1913), cricketer, played 28 First-class cricket matched for Derbyshire.
- James Horsley (1890–1976), cricketer who played 67 first-class cricket matches for Nottinghamshire and Derbyshire

== See also ==
- Listed buildings in Melbourne, Derbyshire
