= Thomas Coke (privy counsellor) =

English courtier and politician

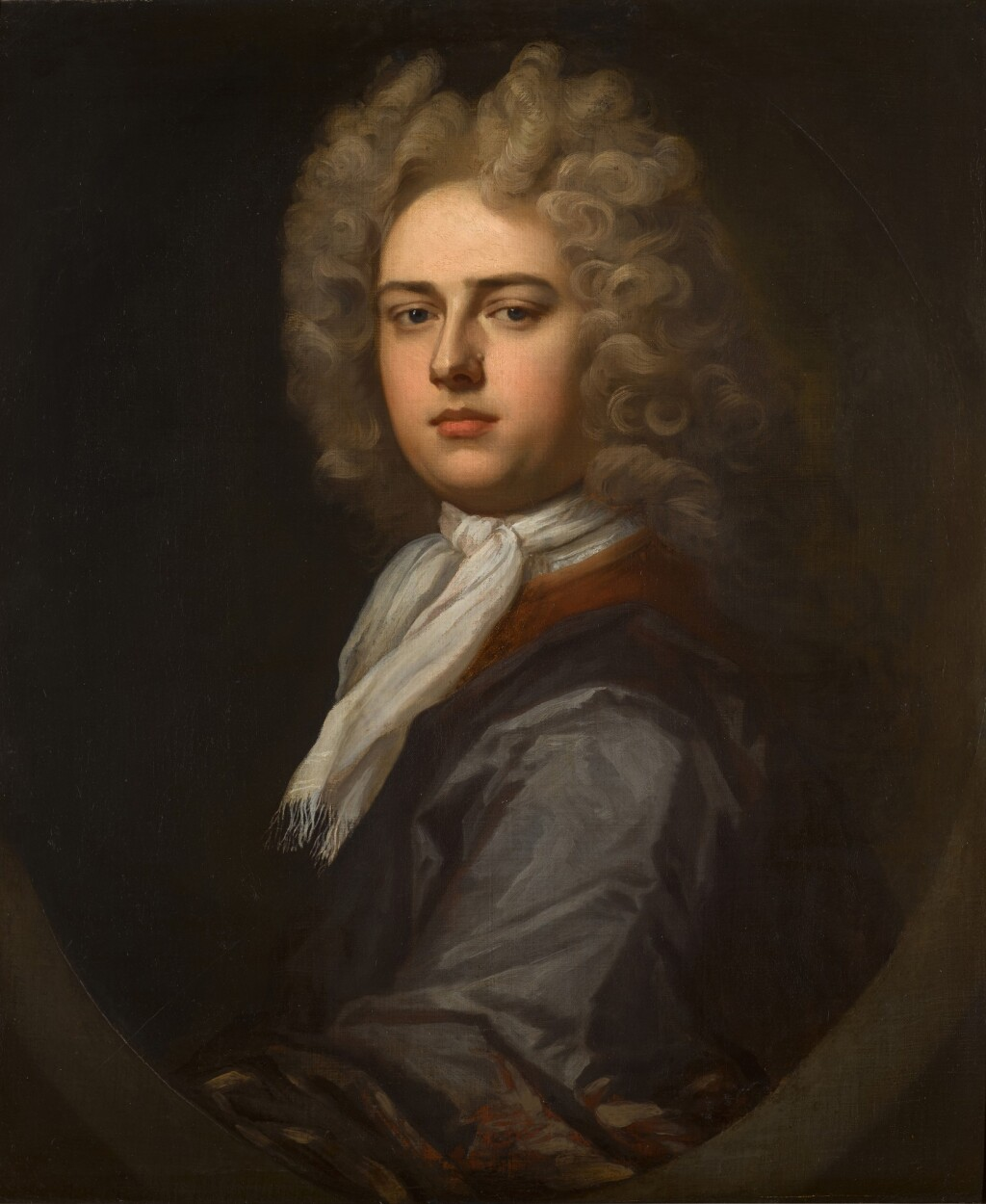
Portrait of the Hon. Thomas Coke (1674–1727) of Melbourne Hall (by Michael Dahl)

Thomas Coke (19 February 1674 – 11 May 1727) of Melbourne Hall, Melbourne, Derbyshire was an English courtier and politician who sat in the House of Commons between 1698 and 1715. Although a Tory on paper, he was prepared to support the Whigs in order to keep hold of his public offices.

== Early life ==
Coke was the son of John Coke and his wife Mary Leventhorpe, daughter of Sir Thomas Leventhorpe, 4th Baronet. He was born at Melbourne, Derbyshire where he was baptised on 19 February 1675. His father was MP for Derby. Coke lost his parents when under age and was educated abroad under Monsieur Chauvais of Rotterdam in 1688. He matriculated at New College, Oxford in 1693 and travelled abroad in the Netherlands in 1696 and 1697. Around June 1698 he married Lady Mary Stanhope daughter of Philip Earl of Chesterfield (with £8,000) at Repton.

== Career ==
Coke was elected Member of Parliament for Derbyshire at the 1698 English general election and sat until January 1701. He was re-elected MP for Derbyshire in December 1701. In March 1702 he was appointed Commissioner of Public Accounts. At the 1702 English general election he was returned unopposed as MP for Derbyshire. He anxiously seeking public office and was eventually appointed Teller of the Receipt of the Exchequer in May 1704. He was returned unopposed again at the 1705 English general election and supported the Court candidate for Speaker. In December 1706, he exchanged offices with Peregrine Bertie to obtain a court place as Vice-Chamberlain of the Household, a position he held for the rest of his life. He was returned again for Derbyshire at the 1708 British general election and was appointed a Privy Counsellor in 1708. By the end of the parliament, his voting record in support of the Whigs, in particular his vote for the impeachment of Dr Sacheverell, alienated his Tory constituents. At the 1710 general election, he declined to face a contest at Derbyshire and was returned instead as MP for Grampound. He was more comfortable in maintaining a Tory stance in this Parliament and was listed as one of the ‘worthy patriots’ who detected the mismanagements of the late ministry. He was returned again at the 1713 British general election, but did not stand at the 1715 British general election or thereafter. He managed to retain his post in spite of misgivings among the Whigs.

He was one of the original backers of the Royal Academy of Music, establishing a London opera company which commissioned numerous works from Handel, Bononcini and others.

== Later life and legacy ==
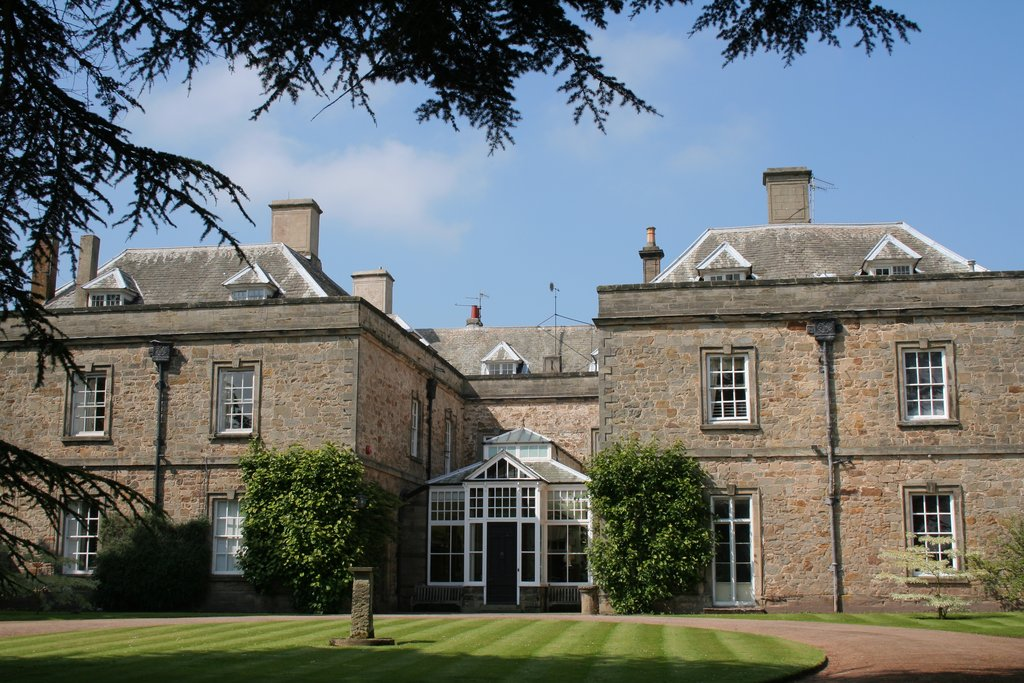
Melbourne Hall main entrance

When Coke came into possession of Melbourne Hall he altered and extended the house. He is credited with creating the gardens at Melbourne. Nevertheless, this created a financial strain. On 15 October 1709, he married as his second wife Elizabeth Hales, daughter of Richard Hales of King's Walden, Hertfordshire, one of the Maids of Honour to Queen Anne.

Coke died suddenly on 16 or 17 May 1727 after a few days illness at the age of 52 and was buried at Melbourne. He had two daughters by his first wife and a daughter and son by his second wife. He left most of the estate to his son George Lewis Coke, with provision for his daughters.

Parliament of England
Preceded by Marquess of Hartington; Lord Roos	Member of Parliament for Derbyshire; 1701–1707; With: John Curzon	Succeeded by Parliament of Great Britain
Parliament of Great Britain
Preceded by Parliament of England	Member of Parliament for Derbyshire; 1707–1710; With: John Curzon	Succeeded by John Curzon; Godfrey Clarke
Preceded by James Craggs; Thomas Scawen	Member of Parliament for Grampound; 1710–1715; With: James Craggs 1710-1713; Andrew Quick 1713-1715	Succeeded by Hon. John West; Charles Cooke
