= Melbourne Hall =

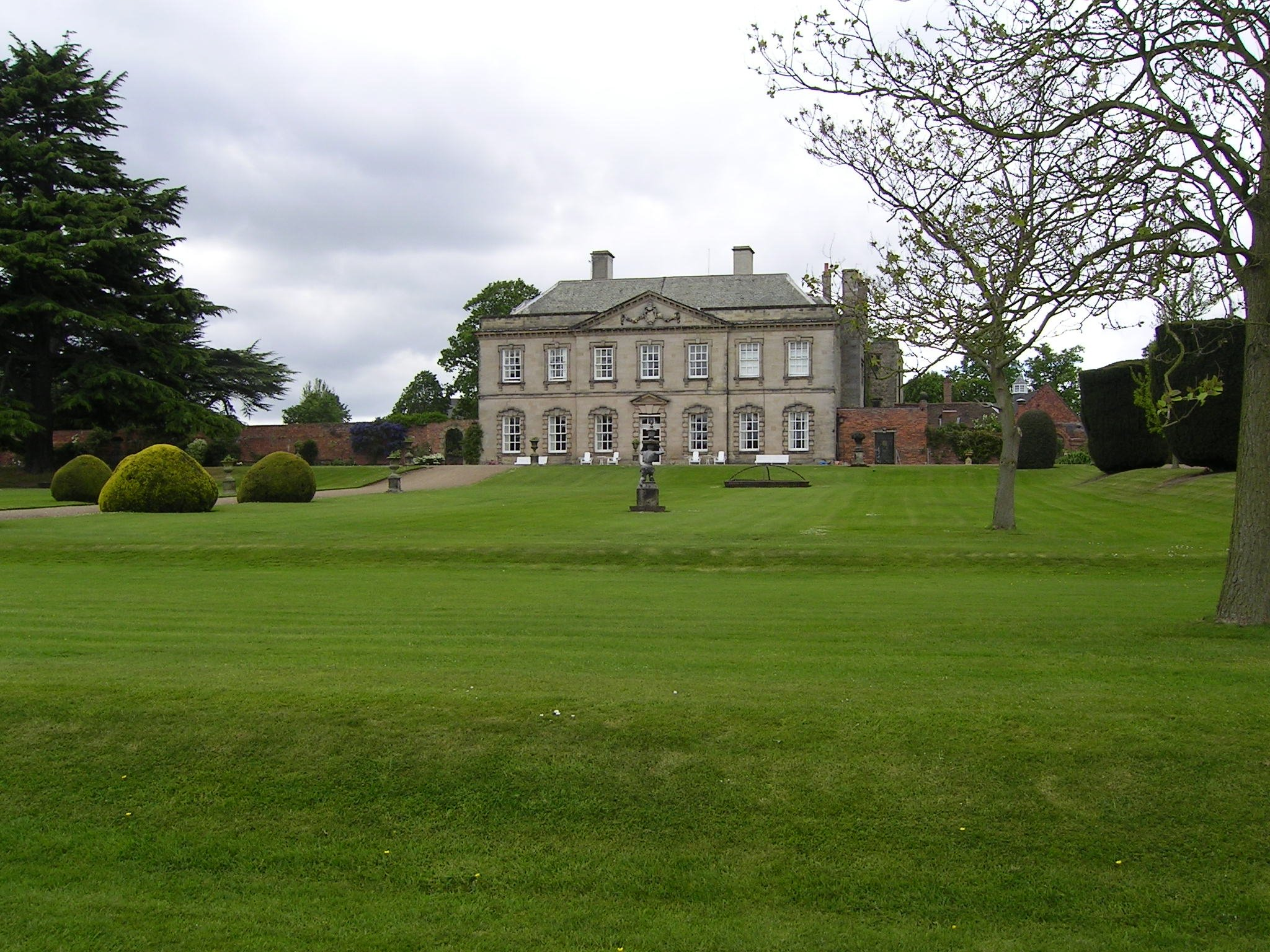
- Melbourne Hall - the garden front
- Interactive map of the Melbourne Hall area

General information
- Location: Melbourne, Derbyshire, England
- Coordinates: 52.8202°N 1.42420°W
- Construction started: 17th century (with earlier origins)
- Client: Sir John Coke

Design and construction
- Engineer: Richard Shepherd
- Designations: House Grade II* listed Aisled barn Grade I listed Laundry Grade I listed

Melbourne Hall is a Georgian country house in Melbourne, Derbyshire, previously owned by the 2nd Viscount Melbourne, British Prime Minister from 1835 to 1841. The house is now owned by the 14th Marquess of Lothian and is open to the public. The house is a Grade II* listed building; more than twenty features in the grounds are Grade I listed.

== History ==
Melbourne, a manor that had belonged to the Bishop of Carlisle in the twelfth century, was partly rebuilt in 1629–31 for Sir John Coke by a Derbyshire mason, Richard Shepherd. In 1692 it was inherited by Thomas Coke (1675–1727), a gentleman architect in the golden age of English amateur architecture, who laid out the formal gardens that survive, with some professional assistance from Henry Wise, between about 1696 and 1706: there are avenues, a parterre, a yew walk that has become a yew tunnel, basins and fountains, and lead and stone sculpture, much of it supplied by John Nost. Coke travelled in the Netherlands and he turned to Nost, the famous sculptor born in the Austrian Netherlands, with premises in Haymarket, London, who provided lead figures of amorini, vases, baskets of flowers and mythological figures, still identifiable at Melbourne, and most notably the lead "Vase of the Seasons" (1705), that is one of the finest examples of Baroque sculpture in lead in an English garden. Nost also provided a number of chimneypieces in the house as well as for Sir Thomas's London house in St. James's Place, one of which came to £50. At the sale of Nost's effects, Sir Thomas purchased his copy of Serlio's Five Books of Architecture, English'd by Robert Peake, which is still in the Library.

Though he drew up a plan for remodelling the sixteenth and seventeenth-century house and had the west wing rebuilt by Francis Smith of Warwick, it remained to his son, G. L. Coke, to rebuild the east front, facing the garden, and adjust the south front, in 1743–44, to a design by William Smith, the son of Francis Smith. His design for a gatehouse, built "according to his Honour's Draught" was built by Smith of Warwick but dismantled before the end of the eighteenth century. Unidentified alterations undertaken in 1720–21 were carried out by the builder William Gilks of Burton-on-Trent. The figure of George Lewis Coke remains an ambiguous one. Some believe that he was never at Melbourne after he left for a foreign tour in his late teens.

Redecorations of the interior were carried out throughout the century, in several campaigns. In 1745 Joseph Hall of Derby was paid for the chimneypiece in the Great Dining Room; in the 1760s, stucco by Samuel Franceys was executed, and for the 1st Viscount Melbourne, in 1772, further interior alterations were carried out by the leading Derbyshire architect, Joseph Pickford. The second Lord Melbourne, Queen Victoria's Prime Minister, was separated from his wife, Lady Caroline Lamb, in 1825, when her liaison with Lord Byron had become notorious.

The house passed into the hands of the Cowper family when Emily Lamb, sister of the childless 3rd (and last) Viscount Melbourne, married the 5th Earl Cowper. (She later married another Prime Minister, Lord Palmerston.) After the death of the 6th Earl, it was leased for twenty years to Colonel & Mrs Henry Gooch, who modernised the house and restored the church. However, it remained in the ownership of the Cowper family until Lady Amabel Cowper married Admiral of the Fleet Lord Walter Kerr who made Melbourne the family home in 1906.

The current owner is the 14th Marquess of Lothian (formerly known as Lord Ralph Kerr), a former High Sheriff of Derbyshire. Lord Lothian also owns Ferniehirst Castle in Scotland and is the current chief of Clan Kerr.

== Architecture ==
=== House ===
The house was reroofed in 2012.

=== Garden ===
Among fine wrought iron made for the grounds at Melbourne by Robert Bakewell is the arbour known as the "birdcage". This was restored by the architect Louis Osman in 1958, in conjunction with the ironwork specialists George Lister & Sons Ltd. Osman researched Bakewell's plans, removing a ton of paint and inserting a thousand new pieces of wrought iron to replace crude repairs, as well as restoring the original colours.

=== Listing designations ===
Melbourne Hall is a Grade II* listed building. (Note: Historic England is the statutory body with responsibility for the listing of buildings in England. It uses a tiered rating system, classifying listed buildings into one of three categories; Grade I, the highest grade, for buildings of “exceptional interest”, Grade II*, the next grade, for buildings of “more than special interest”, and Grade II, the lowest grade, for buildings of “special interest”.) The gardens contain an unusually high number of listed structures and statuary, the majority of which are listed at the highest grade. Those features listed Grade I include: six pairs of cherubim, statues of Perseus, Mercury, and Andromeda the Birdcage Arbour, the Muniment Room and a barn, seats near the Fountain Pond, eight vases, two fountains flanking the Lower Terrace, the steps that link the Top, Upper and Lower Terraces, and the Tea Rooms, a pair of statues depicting slaves, and the walls to the south and east of the house. Features listed at Grade II* include a pair of walls at the top terrace, the water channel which runs through the garden and the bridges that cross it, the stables and stable cottages, a pair of benches, and a grotto. An ice house, an urn and a pair of metal flower baskets, and three sets of walls are listed at Grade II.

== Gallery ==
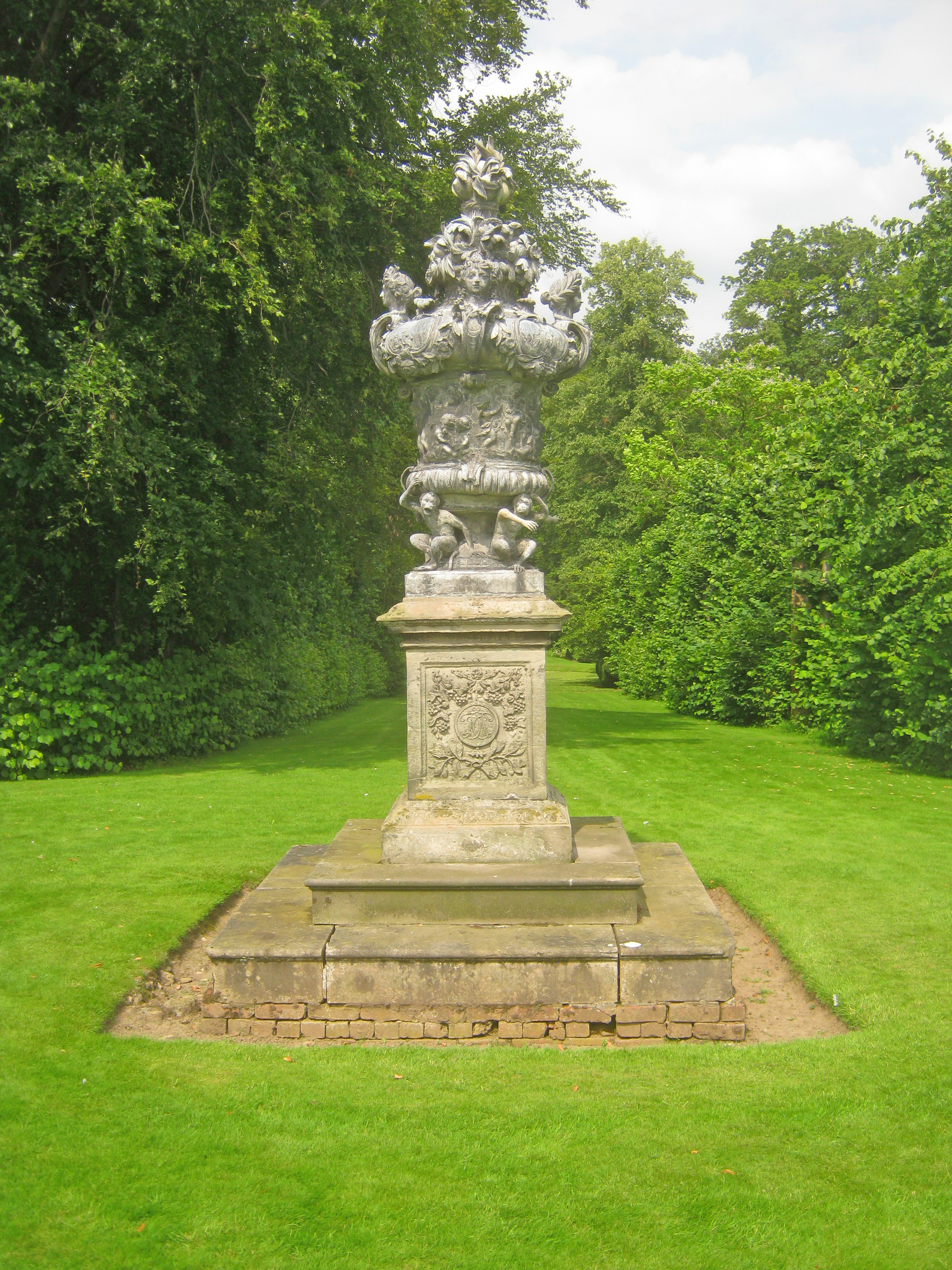
The Four Seasons Vase

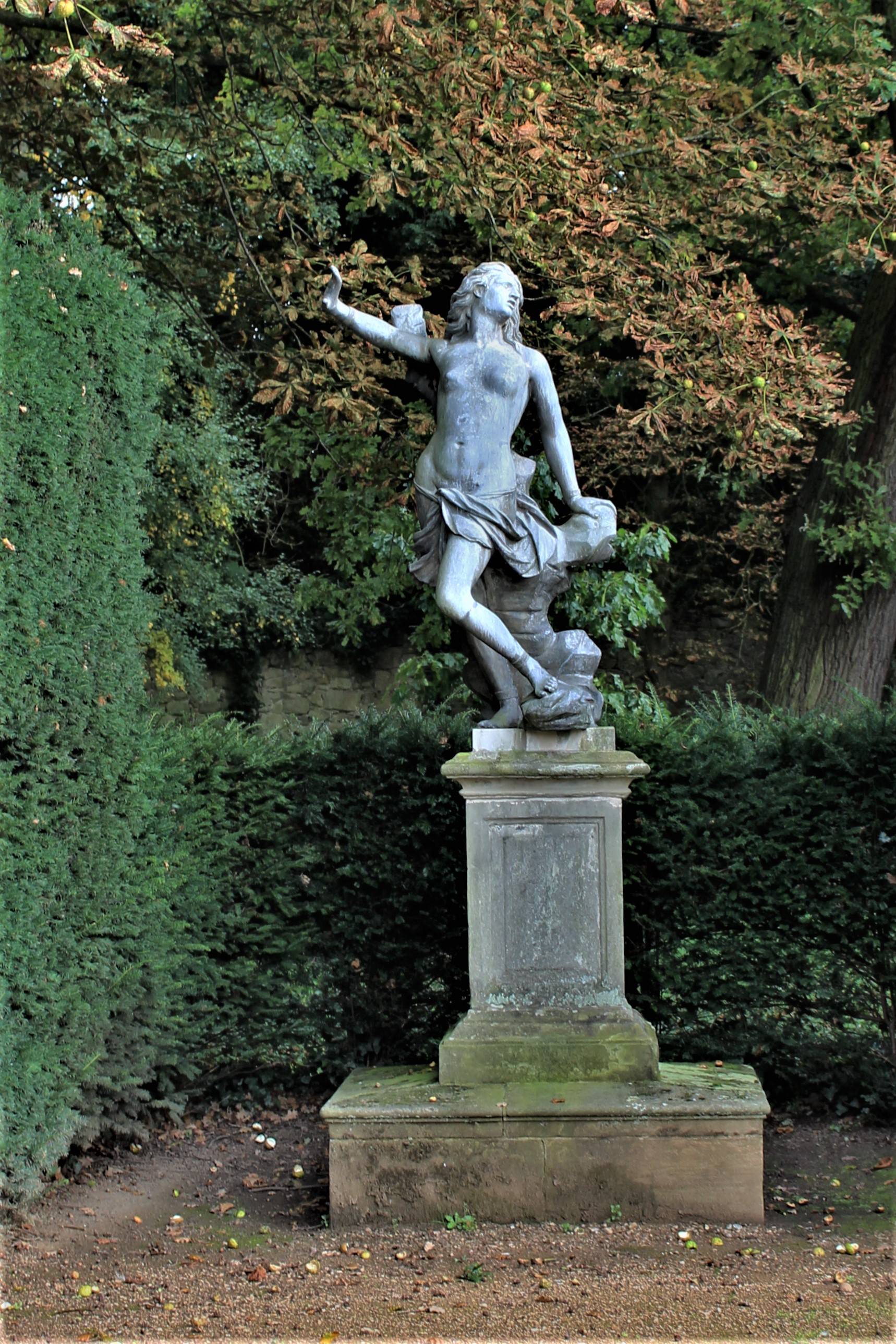
The Andromeda Statue from the workshop of John Nost

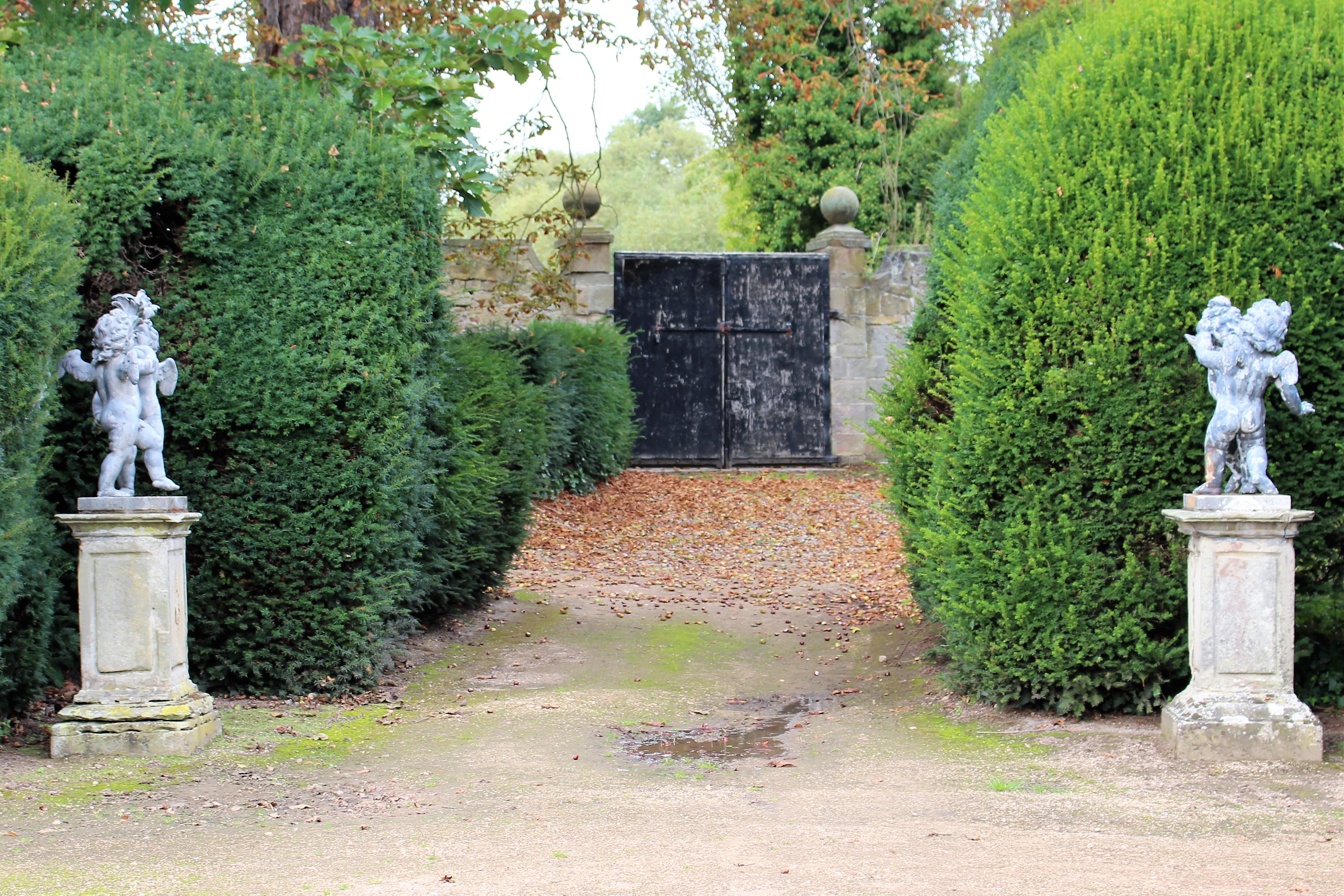
Two brace of cherubs

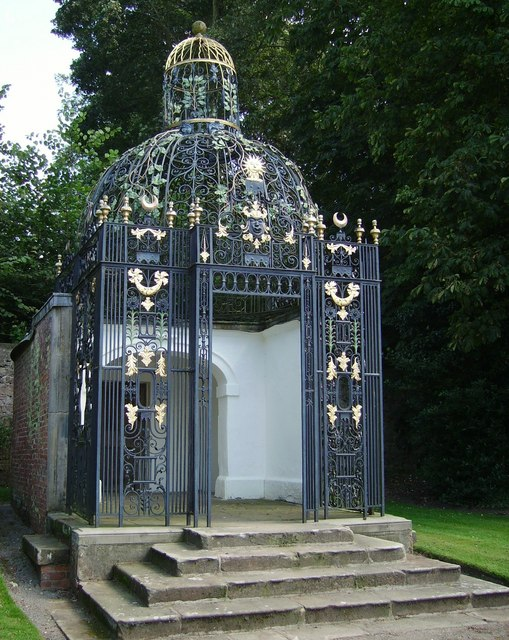
The Birdcage by Robert Bakewell

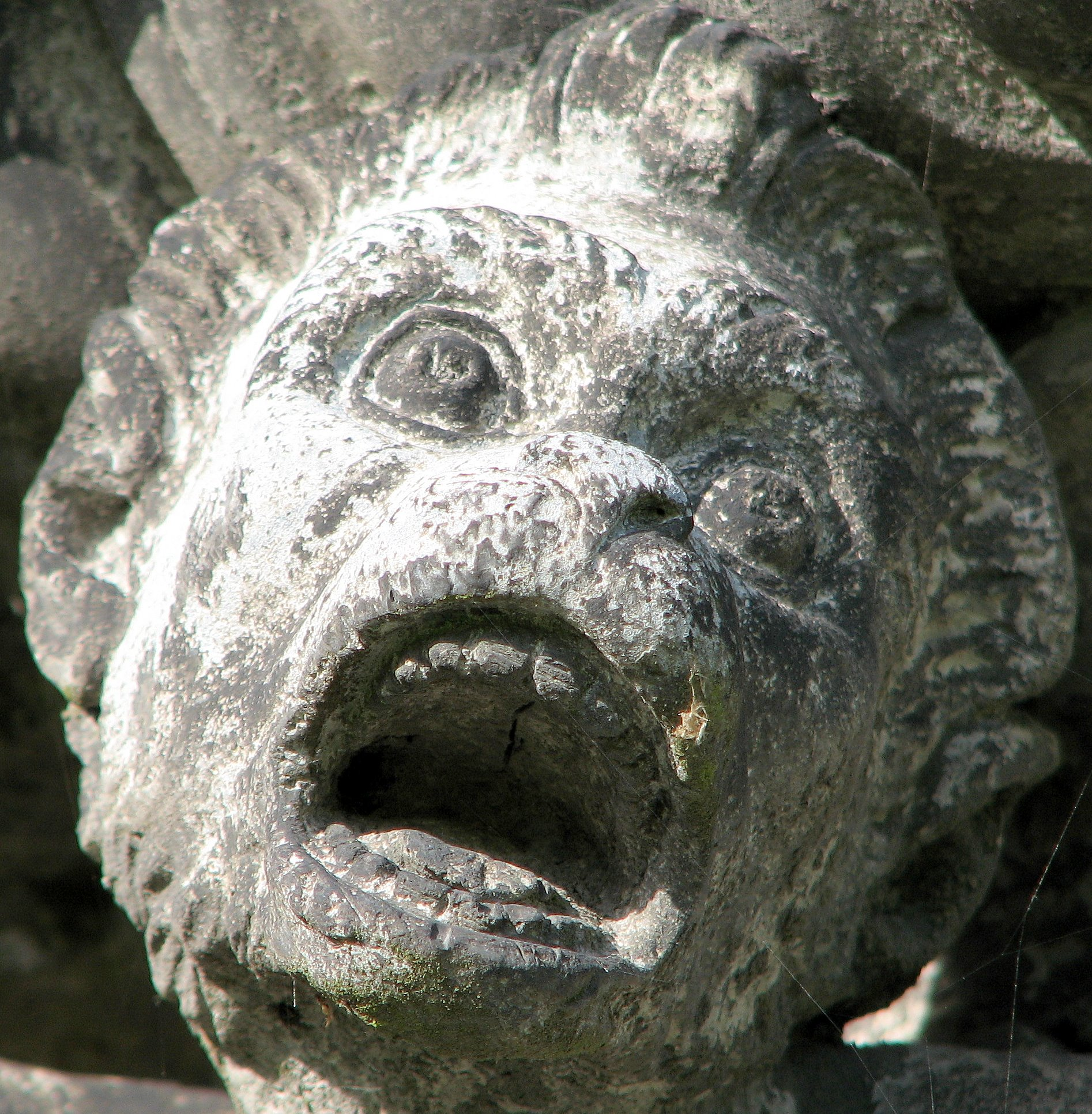
Detail from a vase

== Sources ==
- Howard Colvin, A Biographical Dictionary of British Architects, 1600–1840, 3rd ed. 1995: Thomas Coke, William Gilks
- David Green, Gardener to Queen Anne, 1956. (Henry Wise)
- Rupert Gunnis, Dictionary of British Sculptors 1660–1851, rev, ed.
- Christopher Hussey, English Gardens and Landscapes 1700–1750.
