= Melbourne Castle =

Medieval castle in Melbourne, Derbyshire

- Melbourne, Derbyshire
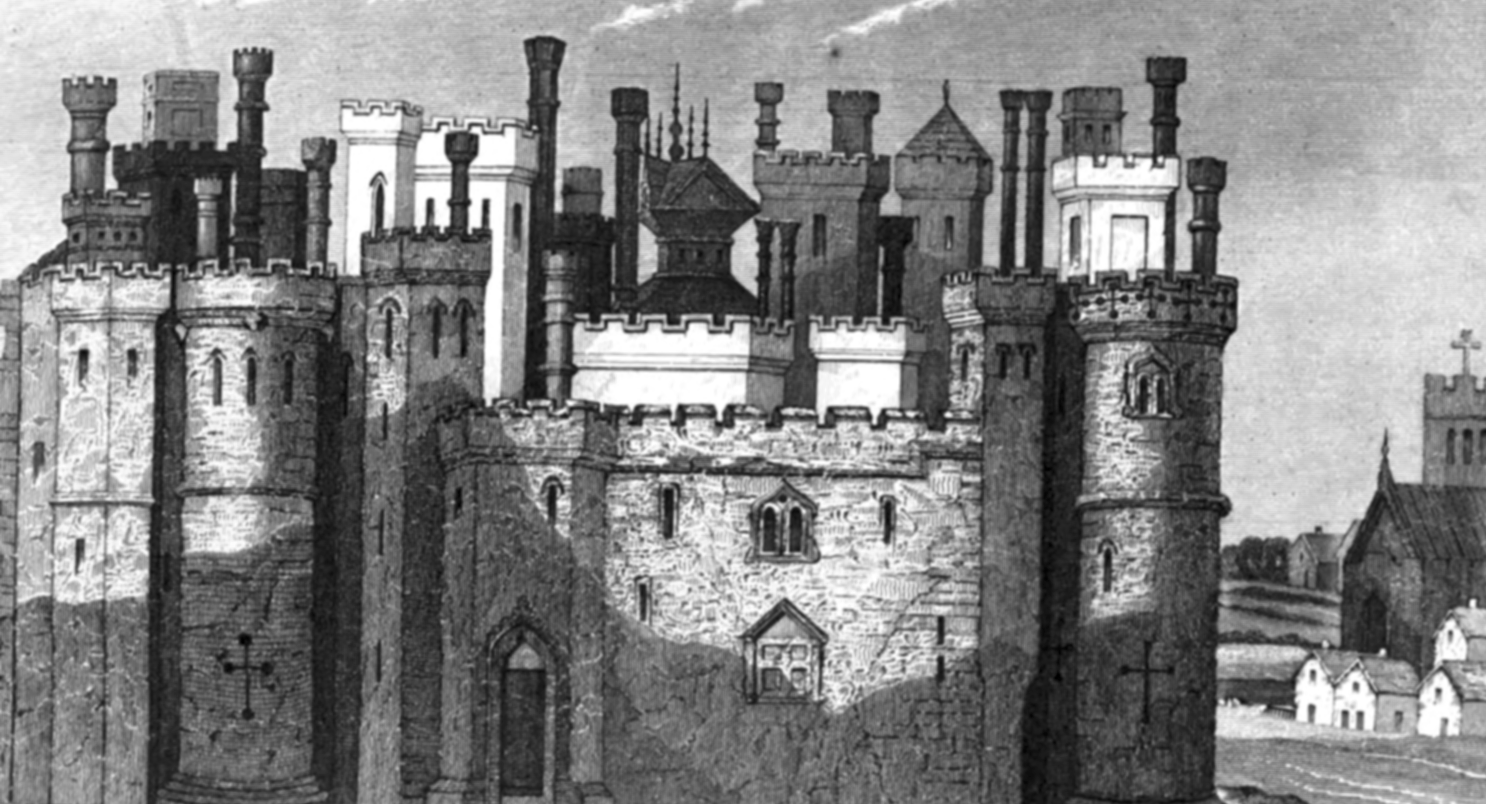
- 19th-century print of a 1602 drawing of the castle

Location
- Location in South Derbyshire
- Location within Derbyshire
- Coordinates: 52.8227°N 1.4241°W

Site history
- Built: Crenellated in the 14th century
- Demolished: 1637

Melbourne Castle was a medieval castle in Melbourne, Derbyshire. It was built on the site of an earlier royal manor house that had provided accommodation for noblemen hunting in a nearby royal park in the reign of King John. Construction of the castle was started in 1311 by Thomas, 2nd Earl of Lancaster, and continued until 1322, shortly before his execution, but the work was never fully completed.

From the early 14th century, Melbourne Castle was mainly in the possession of the Earls and Dukes of Lancaster or the crown. Improvements and repairs were made, particularly by John of Gaunt, and the building was in generally good condition throughout the fifteenth and early sixteenth centuries. John I, Duke of Bourbon, was kept at Melbourne for 19 years after his capture at the Battle of Agincourt in 1415, and the castle was considered as a possible prison for Mary, Queen of Scots, although events led to her incarceration at Tutbury Castle.

The castle was in decline by the end of the reign of Elizabeth I. Although the stonework was sound, minimal maintenance had led to significant deterioration of other parts of the structure. The manor was purchased in 1604 by Henry Hastings, 5th Earl of Huntingdon, who had his own castle in nearby Ashby-de-la-Zouch. The Melbourne property was then demolished and used as a source for building materials. All that remains of Melbourne Castle today is a section of wall about 15 m (49 ft) long and 4 m (13 ft) high and some foundations; nothing is known of the internal layout of the former building. The ruins are grade II listed and the site is a scheduled monument. There is no public access to the castle remains.

== Background ==
Melbourne is a town in South Derbyshire close to the River Trent, which may have originated as buildings associated with the royal manor to the south of the nearby settlement at Kings Newton. Melbourne Castle was constructed on the site of an earlier manor house of unknown date; there is an old tradition that the manor was originally established in about the year 900, during the reign of Alfred the Great, but there is no evidence for this. As recorded in the Domesday Book, the manor of Melbourne and its lands were the property of King Edward the Confessor prior to the Norman Conquest. The property then passed into the hands of William I of England. After creating the Diocese of Carlisle in 1133, Henry I gave the manor for life to Æthelwold, the first bishop. Some time later, the diocese built a palace nearby on the site of what is now Melbourne Hall. When Bishop Æthelwold died in about 1156, the manor reverted to the crown.

A royal hunting park close to Melbourne was probably created by King John around 1200, and the King is known to have stayed at the manor house on at least five occasions. John gave the manor and its lands to Hugh Beauchamp, although they appear to have soon reverted to the crown, being gifted by Henry III to Bishop Walter Mauclerk of Carlisle in about 1230. The estate returned to the crown on the bishop's death in 1248, and Henry granted the land to his son, Edmund Crouchback, 1st Earl of Lancaster, in 1266. In 1291 Edmund was granted free warren for the manor at Melbourne, that is the right to take hares, rabbits, pheasants and partridges. Edmund left his English estates to Thomas, 2nd Earl of Lancaster his eldest son upon his death in 1296, Thomas fully coming into his inheritance from Edmund’s executors in 1298. Early references to the house itself are rare, but there are records of repairs to the gutters in 1246 and to the roof of the King's Chamber in 1248.

== Description ==
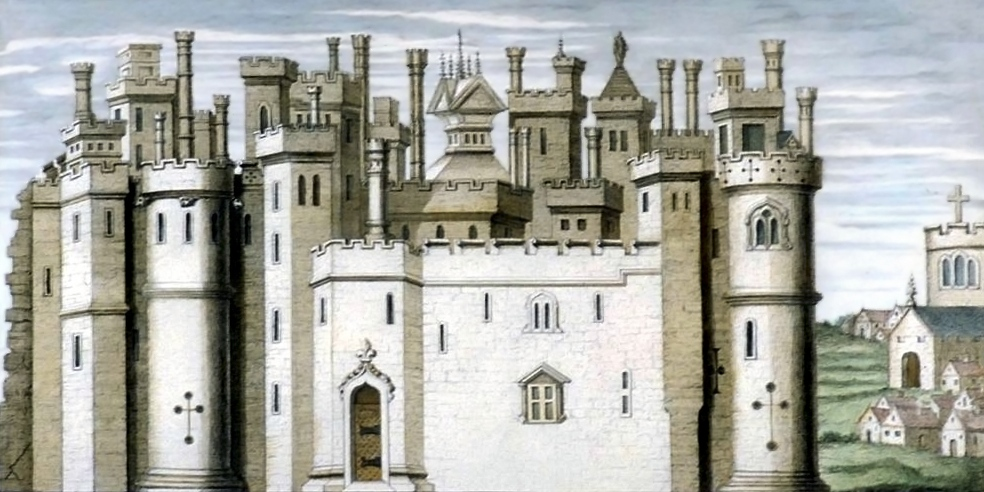
1733 print of a drawing from around 1580

The castle was built to the east of the 14th-century town on a slightly raised location. The area enclosed within the castle's outer walls was about 2.8 hectares (6.9 acres), but with outbuildings, other ancillary constructions and orchards, the total area has been estimated to be at least 8 hectares (20 acres). The walls were constructed with rubble faced with ashlar, and even without their former polished facings the walls are about 3 m (9.8 ft) thick.

All that is known of the appearance of the castle is from contemporary drawings. Although these may seem fanciful to modern eyes, there are better preserved sites which share some features. Tutbury and Pontefract Castles both have similar gatehouses and chapels, and Tutbury's motte and Pontefract's curtain wall are also close in style to those in the illustrations. Sandal Castle has a multi-angular tower like those depicted, and this feature is confirmed at Melbourne by foundations which still remain.

A bakehouse, kitchen and chapel are recorded, as well as the hall, great chamber, and drawbridge, but the details of the internal layout for the castle are unknown.

== History ==
=== Early years ===
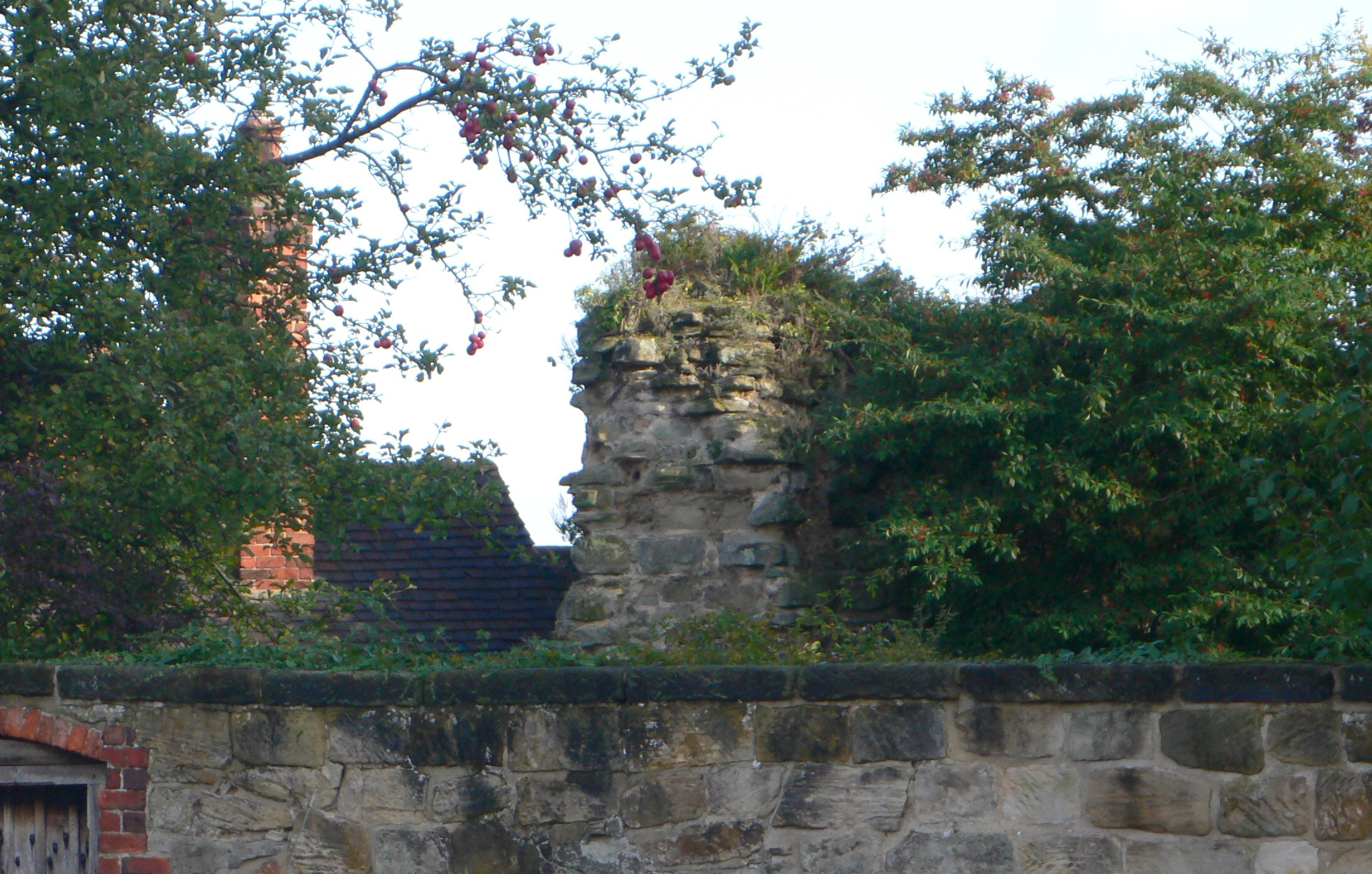
End view of the surviving wall section

Earl Thomas granted the manor to his steward, Robert de Holland, in February 1308. In 1311, Robert obtained a licence to crenellate from Edward II in order to fortify the manor house, and the more modest earlier building was converted into a castle between 1311 and 1322. Local tradition says that the stone was obtained from a quarry on the site of what is now Melbourne Pool. The records show £1,313 was spent on the project in the year 1313–14, (Note: For comparison, the average annual baronial income for the top 27 barons in that period was £668.) of which £548 was paid to masons for dressing stone. Several masons working on the project were involved in an affray at Ravenstone in 1315. The important medieval buildings in Melbourne were constructed from the local bedrock, Millstone Grit. This is a coarsely grained sandstone which can be worked to produce good-quality ashlar. The village was centred around the church, castle and High Street until the late 18th century.

Earl Thomas, with other barons, captured King Edward's favourite, Piers Gaveston, and killed him in 1312. Nevertheless, the King stayed at Melbourne in 1314. For a time, after Edward's defeat at Bannockburn, the earl, a friend of the Scots, controlled most of England, but by 1321 Edward had raised an army and driven Thomas from the Midlands. The Lancastrian castles at Melbourne and Tutbury were left deserted and looted by the local populace. Earl Thomas was finally defeated at the Battle of Boroughbridge in 1322. He was swiftly executed, and Robert de Holland was beheaded in 1328. The King sent a garrison to Melbourne and appointed a steward, Ralph Basset, to replace the incumbent, John de Hardedeshull. In March, those who had stolen from the castle were arrested, and by April Edward had withdrawn his troops. He appointed Robert Tocher and Roger de Beler in 1323 to help administer his possessions in Melbourne using money obtained from confiscations of rebel property in Staffordshire. Edward stayed at Melbourne again in 1325, and while there he issued a right to collect tolls to the men of nearby Swarkestone to repair the bridge over the Trent.

=== Lancastrian improvements ===
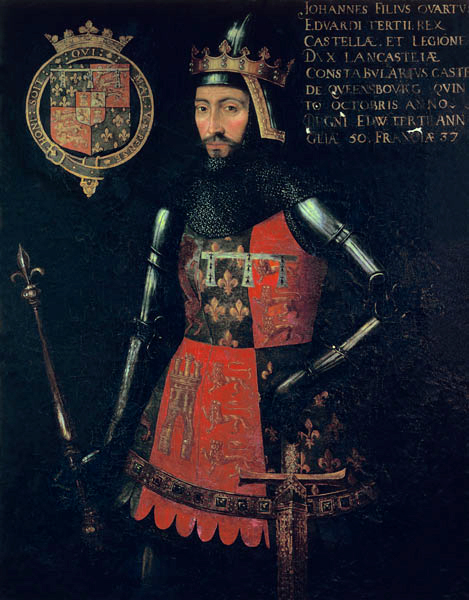
John of Gaunt made significant improvements to the castle in the late 14th century.

The castle, still unfinished at the time of Thomas' execution, along with its lands, remained as crown property until it was bestowed on Henry, 3rd Earl of Lancaster, Earl Thomas' brother, in 1327. In turn it passed to Henry's son, the fourth earl, who became the first Duke of Lancaster. At the time of the duke's death in 1361, his constable was Ingram Fauconer, who received an annual life stipend of £10, a further £5 going to his wife. Henry's heiress was Blanche, wife of John of Gaunt. (Note: Henry had no male heir, so his title, Duke of Lancaster, died with him. It was recreated for John of Gaunt, who is also the first duke, but of the second creation. The Duchy of Lancaster has been a royal privilege since 1413.) Duke John confirmed Fauconer's pension when he came into possession of the Lancastrian lands. Catalina, the three-year-old daughter of John by his second wife Constance of Castile, was given her own room and a Castilian attendant at the castle in 1375.

Peter Melbourne was made keeper of the Melbourne estate in 1377 with an annual income of £10. He was granted another 66s 8d in 1386, and 10 marks (£6 13s 4d) in 1395. The last award was conditional on his not meddling with the offices of constable and keeper of the parks, which had passed on to his son, also called Peter. The younger Peter Melbourne was involved in the upbringing of the future Henry IV during the reign of Richard II. He was again appointed constable and steward of the Derbyshire manor in March 1399, although he gave up his office in April in return for an annuity from King Richard, who had confiscated the Lancastrian estates when John of Gaunt died earlier that year. Upon Henry's seizure of the throne, Peter was confirmed as constable, and in October 1399 his annuity was increased from £10 to 100 marks (£66 8s); in the following year he was awarded land in Derbyshire confiscated from Thomas Merke, Bishop of Carlisle, co-leader of plot against the King. (Note: A statue of a knight in Melbourne church has the de Melbourne arms of a chevron and three scallops.)

The Duchy of Lancaster continued to improve and expand the property through the fourteenth and fifteenth centuries. John of Gaunt had windows glazed in the Communal Hall and the Great Chamber in 1392/3, along with other works. He repaired a drawbridge in 1393/4 and made plumbing improvements in 1399/1400, using lead acquired as a forfeit two years earlier.

For 19 years, the castle served as a prison for John I, Duke of Bourbon after he was taken at the Battle of Agincourt in 1415. (Note: Bourbon was granted 20s a day as keep for himself and his retinue, and 33s 4d when travelling. He was allowed to visit the Duke of Orléans, who was held in Pontefract castle, and to go to London.) His custodian was a Nicholas Montgomery the Younger. Nineteenth-century local historian John Joseph Briggs claimed that during the Wars of the Roses, the castle was partially dismantled by the Lancastrian forces of Margaret of Anjou, but since her campaign was along the line of the Great North Road, it was Melbourn, Cambridgeshire she sacked, not its Derbyshire namesake. (Note: The original source, Stowe's Annals of England, listed the towns as Grantham, Stamford, Peterborrow (Peterborough), Huntingdon, Royston, Meleborne and "all the townes by the way into St Albans". The Melbourne concerned is 3.2 km (2.0 mi) from Royston.)

In 1545, antiquarian John Leland reported to Henry VIII the property was in good enough shape that it was described as "praty and yn meately good reparation" (Note: "pretty and in appropriately good repair." Of 258 castles surveyed by Leland, only 91 were described as in good condition.) perhaps following repairs in the reign of Edward IV, when Sir Ralph Shirley, a commander at Agincourt, was governor of the castle.

=== Decline ===
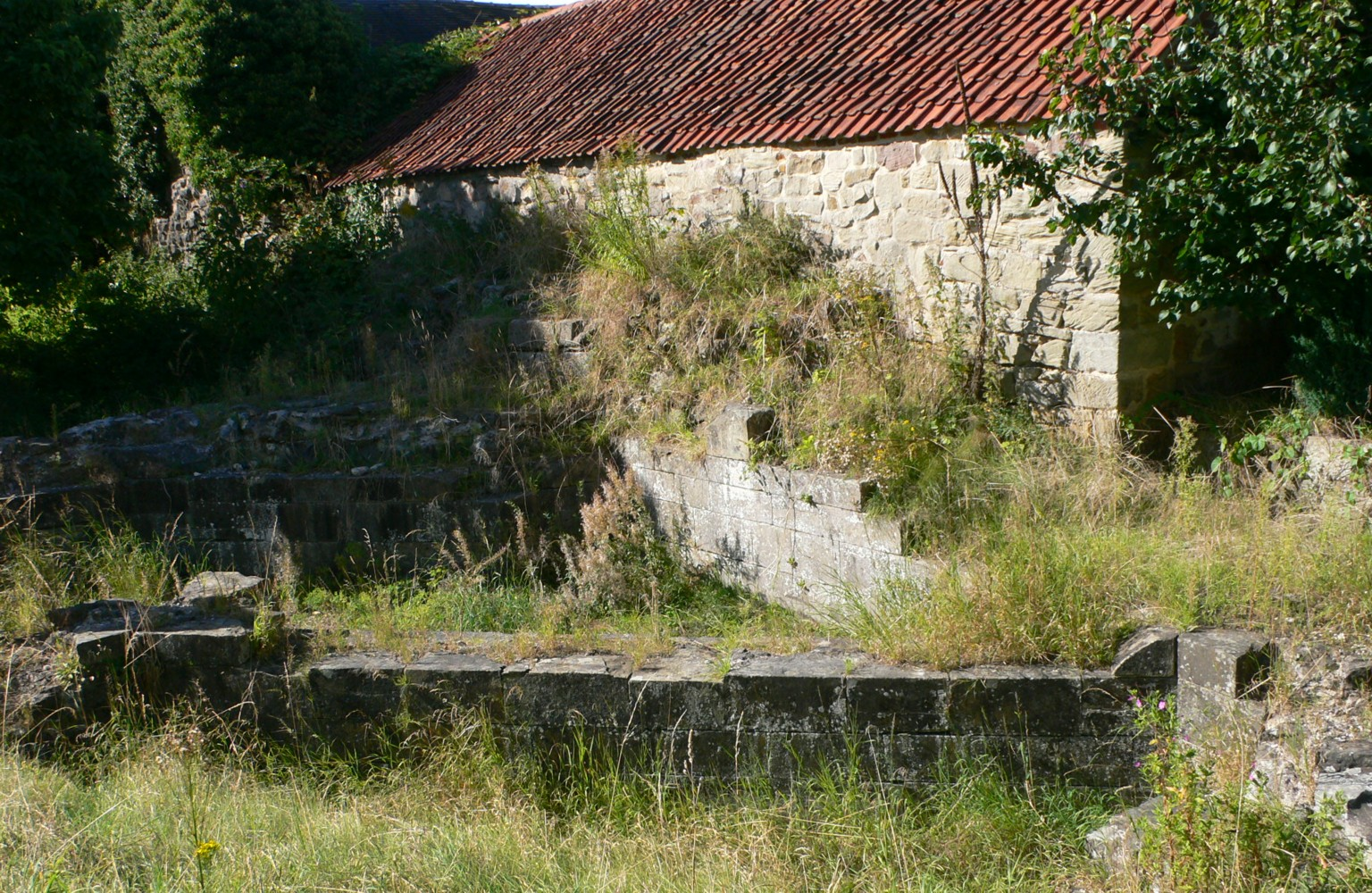
The foundations of the turret (foreground)

When Elizabeth I became queen, she ordered a survey of her castles. A 1562 report told her that only ten castles in the north of her realm were worth keeping; Melbourne was not one of these. A further survey in 1576 reported that, although the stonework was in good condition apart from one chimney and window, the timbers were perished, the lead roof was full of holes, one kitchen was on the verge of collapse, and another needed its floor replacing. In the same year, George Talbot, 6th Earl of Shrewsbury, wrote to the queen to assure her that the castle was in good condition, worth £1,000, and could be repaired for £100. Since he was responsible for keeping the imprisoned Mary, Queen of Scots, and her 140 retainers, he hoped to get her moved to Melbourne. In 1583, the castle was inspected again to see if it was suitable to house the captive queen. Although the rooms were sufficient in number and quality, the unfinished building was deemed "imperfect at every corner". The large rooms would need subdividing, the floors were earth and plaster, and there was no paved courtyard "so as being out of dors you are in the myre, for it is verie foule and unpleasaunt to walk round about the said house". In 1584, Queen Elizabeth finally decided to move Mary to Melbourne, only for the plan to be abandoned following the Babington Plot to assassinate the English queen and place her Scottish cousin on the throne.

In 1597, the castle was being used as a cattle pound, although a survey in 1602 assured Elizabeth that it was a "faire and anciente castle, which her Majesty keepeth in her own hands." The constable's annual fee of £10 was the same as that paid to Ingram Fauconer 140 years earlier.

The castle and lands were bought for £4,700 in 1604, by Henry Hastings, 5th Earl of Huntingdon, whose family seat at Ashby de la Zouch Castle was just 11 km (6.8 mi) away. Melbourne Castle was destroyed between 1610 and 1637 so that its materials could be used in other construction. By 1629, it is likely that all the worked stone above ground level had been removed; Sir John Coke of Melbourne Hall obtained permission from the Bishop of Carlisle in that year to quarry stone from the castle foundations. Some of the facing stones were used to repair the weir at King's Mill, seen by some at the time to fulfil the words of a local prophet that "the waters of the Trent should overflow the towers of Melbourne castle". The Hastings estate was gradually sold off, and the castle site was sold by Earl Moira in 1811.

== Ruins and archaeology ==
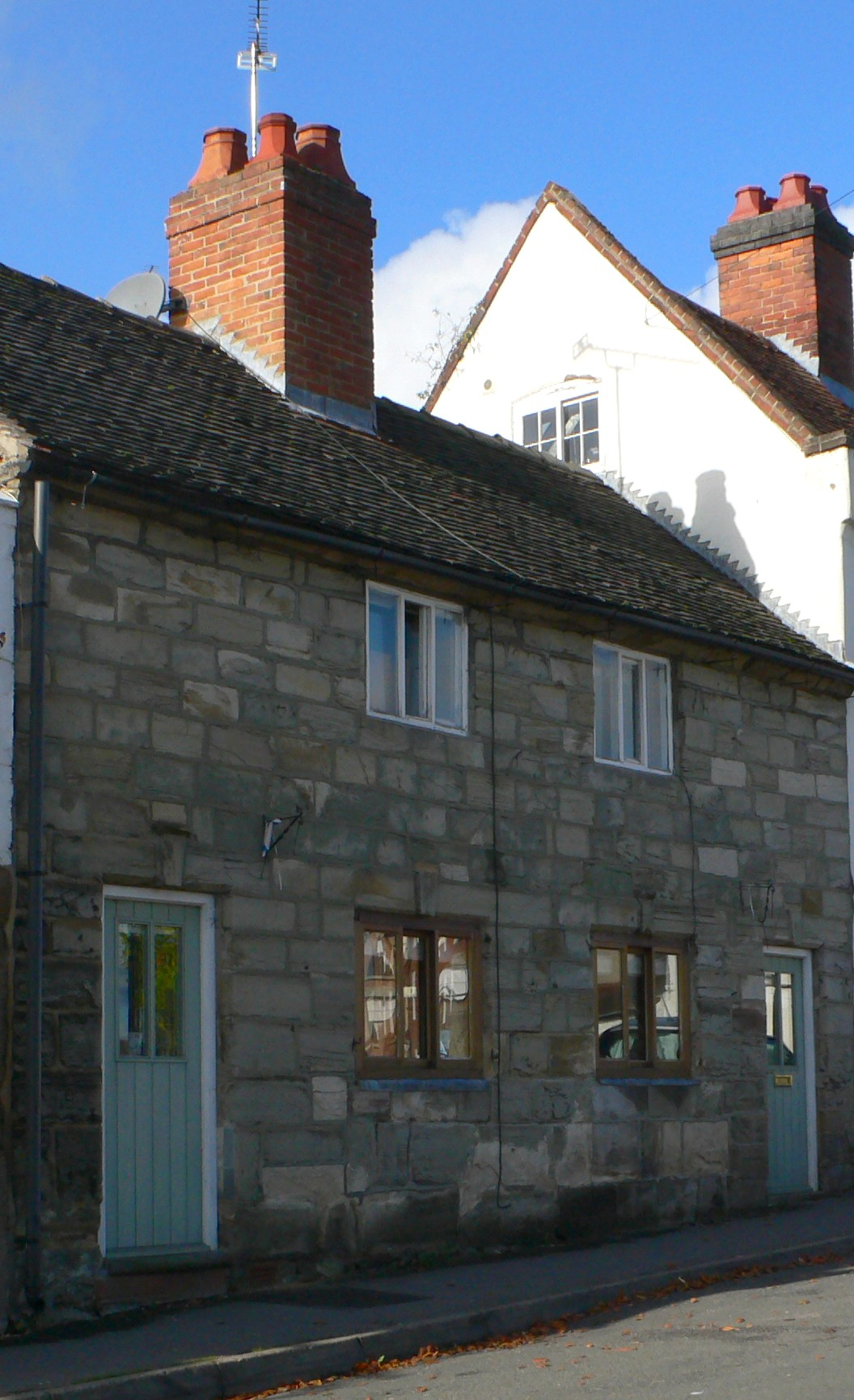
43 and 45 Castle Street are faced with stone taken from the castle.

A section of rubble wall about 15 m (49 ft) long and 4 m (13 ft) high remains, incorporated into an outbuilding of the adjacent farm on its north side. The ruins and the later farmhouse are jointly grade II listed and the castle remains are designated as a scheduled monument. The area to the south of the wall has been excavated to reveal the ashlar bases of two polygonal towers. The site is on the east side of Castle Street in a private garden to which there is no public access.

Some of the stone taken from the castle was used to construct the mid-18th-century grade II-listed buildings at 43 and 45 Castle Street, and other buildings known to have used the stone, but no longer extant, include old houses demolished to build the Castle Mill textile factory. The mill, now demolished, was said to have been built on castle foundations up to 4 m (13 ft) thick; 15 Castle Street also rests on the old foundation wall. It is likely that the former Melbourne Furnace and the Furnace Farm barn also used recycled castle material.

An early 19th-century excavation found underground apartments "of considerable extent and superior workmanship", and excavations in the latter part of the same century found considerable foundations in the gardens of Castle Farm. Castle Mills housing estate contains a now-covered well 2 m (6.6 ft) in width and 15 m (49 ft) deep, and work in 1961 uncovered massive 5 m (16 ft) foundations east of the old mill and on the same alignment as the existing wall. Excavations in 1969–1971 found an extensive network of walls faced with ashlar, a door post, the base of a spiral staircase and evidence of an outer courtyard. Many stones had mason's marks. During construction works in 1988, masonry including the rubble centres of two large east–west walls was found in test trenches. Apart from the area of the turret bases next to the standing wall, none of the archaeology is now visible., although the English Heritage listing considers that buried remains are very well-preserved, particularly beneath Castle Orchard and the grounds of Castle Farm, but also in areas affected by 19th- and 20th-century disturbance.

== See also ==
- Listed buildings in Melbourne, Derbyshire

== Cited texts ==
- Black, Jeremy M. (2006). A Military History of Britain: From 1775 to the Present. Santa Barbara, California: Praeger. ISBN 978-0-275-99039-8.
- Briggs, John Joseph (1852). The History of Melbourne, in the County of Derby: Including Biographical Notices of the Coke, Melbourne, and Hardinge Families (2nd ed.). Derby: Bemrose & Son.
- Curry, Anne (2013). "The Finances of 'the Young Lord Henry'". In Dodd, Gwilym (ed.). Henry V: New Interpretations. York: York Medieval Press. pp. 11–34. ISBN 978-1-903153-46-8.
- Emery, Anthony (1996). Greater Medieval Houses of England and Wales, 1300–1500: East Anglia, Central England and Wales. Cambridge: Cambridge University Press. ISBN 978-0-521-58131-8.
- Fane, W. Dashwood (1895). "The Date of the Parish Church of Melbourne, Derbyshire". Journal of the Derbyshire Archaeological and Natural History Society. XVII. Derby: Derbyshire Archaeological Society: 82–94.
- Firth, John Benjamin (1905). Highways and Byways in Derbyshire. Illustrated by Erichsen, Nelly. London: Macmillan and Co.
- Greenway, Diana E., ed. (1971). "Bishops of Carlisle". Fasti Ecclesiae Anglicanae 1066–1300. Vol. 2: Monastic Cathedrals (Northern and Southern Provinces). London: Institute of Historical Research. pp. 19–21 – via British History Online.
- Heath, Philip (2005). Melbourne: Conservation Area Histories, District of South Derbyshire (PDF). Swadlincote, Derbyshire: South Derbyshire District Council. Archived from the original (PDF) on 14 October 2013.
- Lysons, Daniel; Lysons, Samuel (1817). Magna Britannia: Being a Concise Topographical Account of the Several Counties of Great Britain. Vol. 5: Derbyshire. London: Cadell.
- Mel Morris Conservation (2011). Melbourne Conservation Area Character Statement (PDF). Swadlincote, Derbyshire: South Derbyshire District Council. Archived from the original (PDF) on 21 October 2013.
- Pounds, Norman J. G. (1993). The Medieval Castle in England and Wales: A Political and Social History. Cambridge: Cambridge University Press. ISBN 978-0-521-45828-3.
- Rickard, John (2002). The Castle Community: The Personnel of English and Welsh Castles, 1272–1422. Woodbridge, Suffolk: Boydell Press. ISBN 978-0-85115-913-3.
- Stroud, Gill (2002). Derbyshire Extensive Urban Survey Archaeological Assessment Report: Melbourne. Matlock, Derbyshire: Derbyshire Archaeology Data Service.
- Thompson, Michael W. (2008). The Decline of the Castle. Cambridge: Cambridge University Press. ISBN 978-0-521-08397-3.
- Usher, Howard (1991). "Melbourne Castle" (PDF). Derbyshire Miscellany. 12 (5). Stafford: Derbyshire Archaeological Society: 126–132. ISSN 0417-0687.
- Weir, Alison (2008). Katherine Swynford. London: Vintage. ISBN 978-0-7126-4197-5.
