= St Michael's Church, Sutton Bonington =

Church in Main Street, Sutton Bonington

Coordinates: 52.824°N 1.253°W

St. Michael's Church
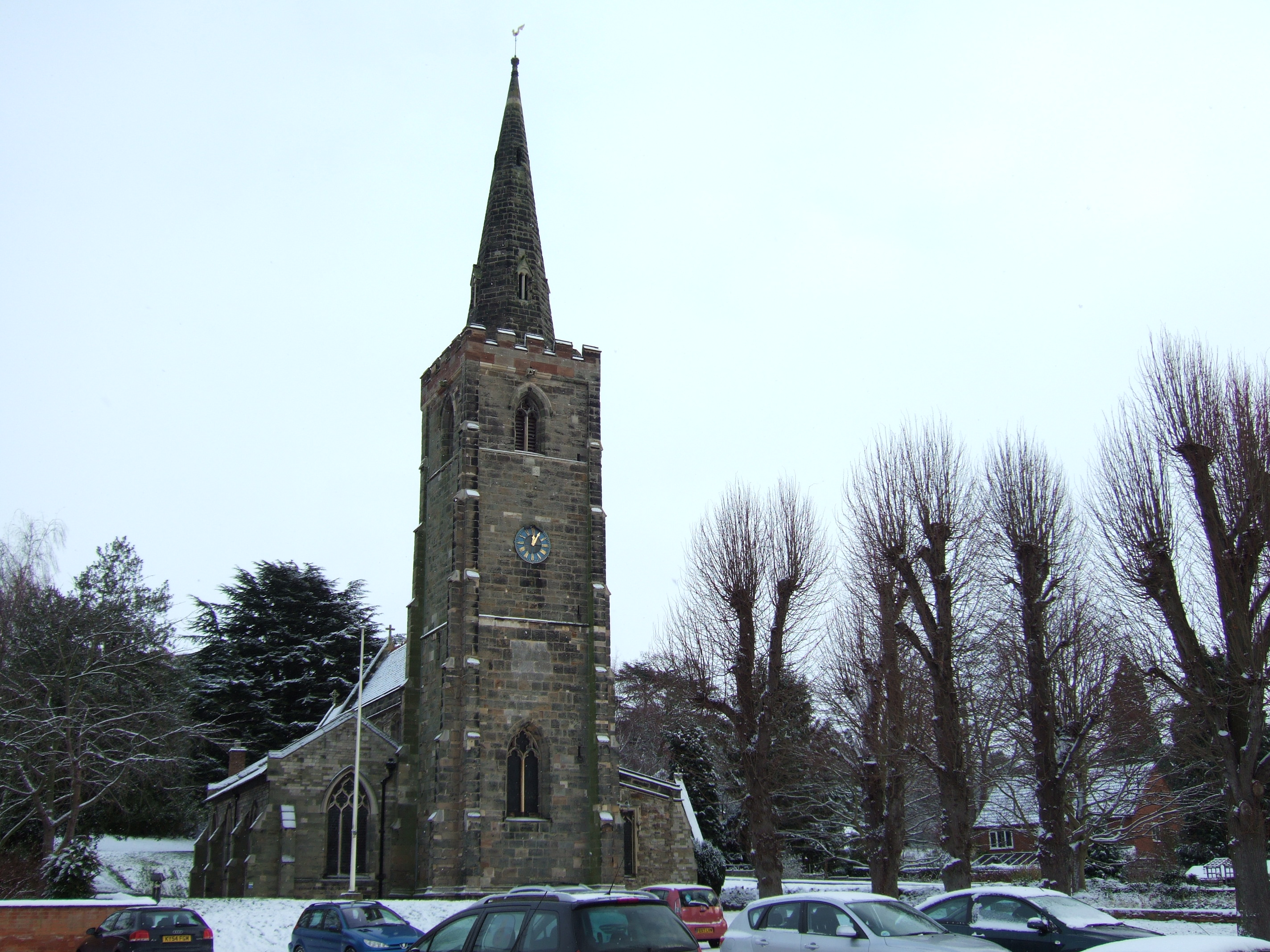
- The church as viewed from Main Street
- St. Michael's Church
- Location: Main Street, Bonington
- Denomination: Church of England

History
- Status: parish church (United with St. Anne's)
- Dedication: St. Michael

Architecture
- Functional status: active
- Heritage designation: Grade II*; Listed building
- Designated: 13 Oct 1966

Administration
- Province: York
- Diocese: Southwell and Nottingham
- Parish: Sutton Bonington (pre-1923: Bonington)

St. Michael's Church is a parish church in the Church of England in Sutton Bonington, Nottinghamshire.

The church is a 13th-century Grade II* Listed building.

== History ==
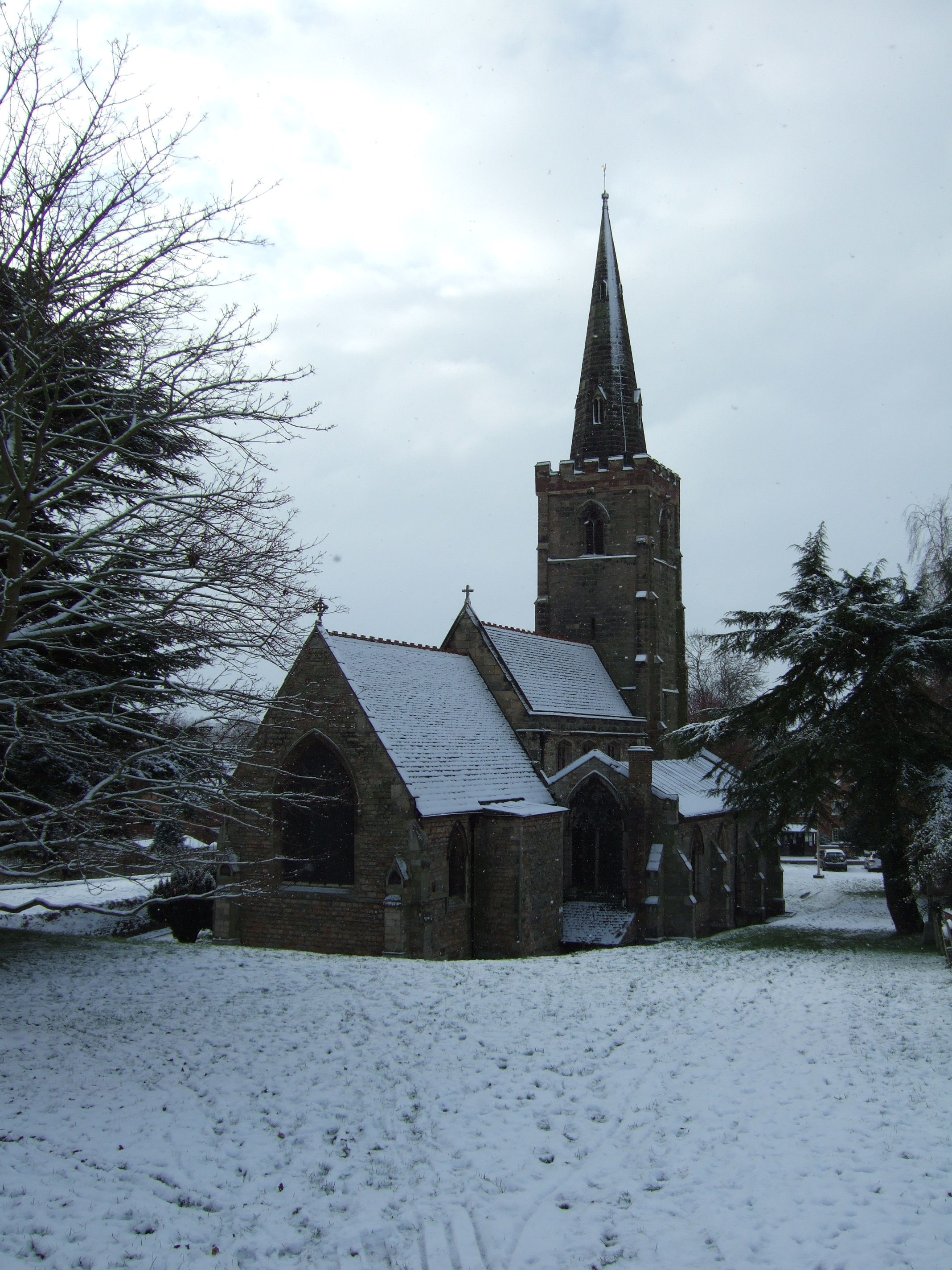
The church viewed from the rear

Sutton Bonington has two medieval churches, a result of the merging of the two original villages (Sutton and Bonington); they are St. Michael's Church (Bonington's church) and St Anne's Church (Sutton's church, located down St Anne's Lane). St Michael's is the larger (and much taller) of the two churches.

The two ancient ecclesiastical parishes of Sutton and Bonington were united for civil purposes in 1829 and combined in 1923 into one ecclesiastical parish (with one rector appointed from 1950). St. Michael's Rectory, situated on the other side of the Midland Main Line, is now used by the University of Nottingham, who have a large campus just north of the village, to house postgraduate students. Related to the situation of the two original parishes, Sutton and Bonington are separate manors, named after their churches — St. Anne and St. Michael respectively.

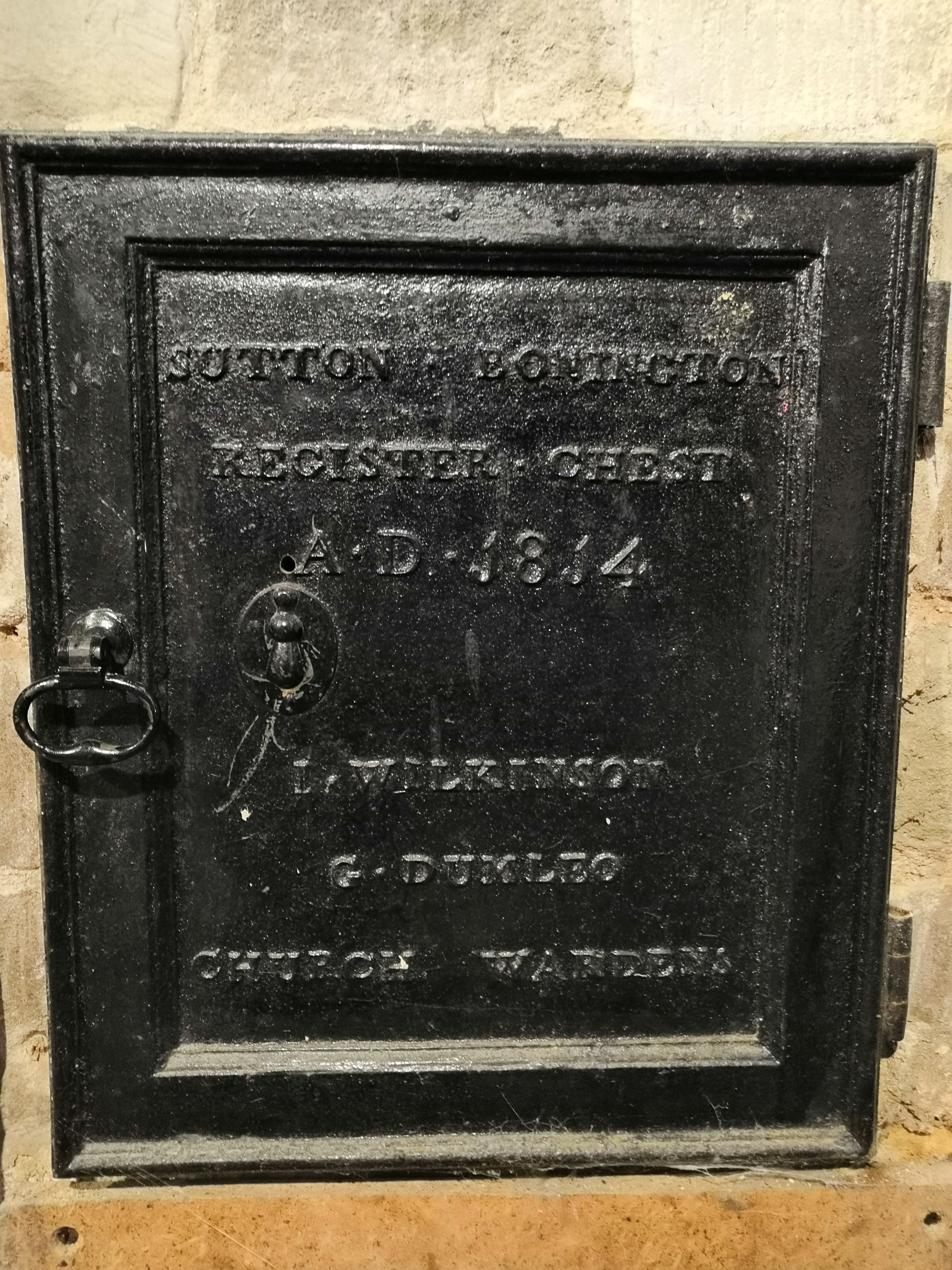
1814 Sutton Bonington parish register safe

=== Present day ===
Regular services continue to be held in both churches. The current priest in charge (for both churches in Sutton Bonington) is Glenn Martin, who is also the priest in charge of the neighbouring parish of Normanton on Soar (with its Grade I Church of St. James).

== Bells ==
The tall church tower has a peal of six bells. Originally the peal consisted of just three bells, cast by Henry Oldfield's foundry in Nottingham, two of which remain; the oldest dates back to 1579 and is the second oldest bell in Nottinghamshire. Two more bells were added in 1849/50 and a sixth bell in 1977 purchased for the sum of £320 from St Andrew’s Church at Watton at Stone in Hertfordshire to commemorate the Silver Jubilee of Elizabeth II. The weights of the bells range from 4cwts 86 lbs (treble) to 17cwts 97 lbs (tenor). The installation has recently been restored by John Taylor & Co, a large bell foundry in nearby Loughborough who cast a number of the bells. The bells are rung for Sunday morning services and at fortnightly practice sessions.

== See also ==
- Grade II* listed buildings in Nottinghamshire
- Listed buildings in Sutton Bonington
