= Cecil Paget =

Lt.-Col. Sir Cecil Walter Paget, 2nd Baronet CMG DSO (19 October 1874 – 9 December 1936), was an English locomotive engineer and railway administrator. He was general superintendent of Midland Railway from 1907 until the First World War. Though his railway career was brief, he was influential in his methods of centralised traffic control at Midland Railway, which soon became the industry standard.

== Early life and education ==
Paget was born in Sutton Bonington, Nottinghamshire, the third child and second son of Sir Ernest Paget and Sophia Holden. His father was chairman of the Midland Railway (MR) 1890–1911 and created a baronet in 1897 by Queen Victoria.

He was educated at Harrow and Pembroke College, Cambridge.

In 1900, his elder brother, George, was killed during the Boer War.

== Career ==
Paget then joined the MR as an engineering pupil of S. W. Johnson, the company's Locomotive Superintendent. Paget rose quickly to become Works Manager at the main Derby Works from 1904, under Johnson's successor R. M. Deeley. He was also Deeley's deputy.

April 1907 saw Paget appointed general superintendent of the MR by the new general manager Guy Granet. The role, which would now be called chief operating officer, was expanded from that of the previous 'superintendent of the line' and put him in charge of the daily running of the locomotive department, which was formerly a responsibility of his erstwhile boss, Deeley. The appointment was also open to charges of nepotism against his father. This inevitably led to some friction.

=== Paget locomotive ===
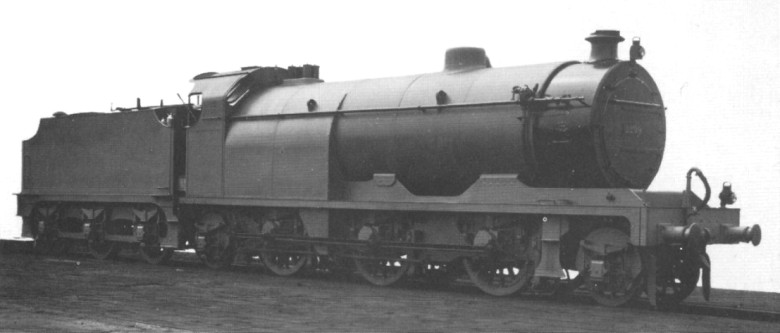
Paget locomotive

Interest in possible developments of the classic steam locomotive led Paget to design and build a 2-6-2 steam locomotive with many novel features, including 8 single-acting cylinders with rotary valves at Derby. He financed this from his own pocket, and work began in 1906 while he was Works Manager. When Paget ran out of money for his experimental locomotive, it was completed by the MR at an additional cost of £1,500, but, without the close supervision of Paget, and probably because of the animosity of Deeley, there was inadequate testing and a lack of remedial work on the design. Work stopped in 1909 and the remains of the locomotive were scrapped in about 1918.

=== Traffic management ===
Paget's radical ideas were more successful in the sphere of traffic management and his introduction of train reporting, centralised traffic control and locomotive numbering by power type quickly reduced costs incurred by delays to trains.

=== Locomotive policy ===
A point of agreement with Deeley was the need for larger locomotives to haul heavier trains, but this policy failed to get past the company's board because of the capital expenditure required (particularly on replacing weak under-bridges).

== Military service ==
Paget served in France with the Railway Operating Division in World War I, commanding operations in France and Belgium and rising to the rank of Lieutenant-Colonel in the Royal Engineers. His military awards were the DSO in 1916, the CMG in 1918 and he was Mentioned in Despatches. The French awarded him Officier de la Légion d'honneur and the Belgians their Officier de l'Ordre de la Couronne.

== Personal life ==
In 1906, Paget married Lady Alexandra Godolphin Osborne, fourth daughter of the 9th Duke of Leeds, at St. Andrew's Church, Wells Street, Westminster. They resided at Alvaston Fields in Derby while they restored Kings Newton Hall, the 17th-century family hall that had been damaged in a fire in 1859. The restoration was completed in 1910.

In 1925, Lady Alexandra sued for divorce, which he did not contest. She testified that their marriage was an unhappy one, and that when he was on leave in England in 1917, he informed her that he had a mistress, a situation he expected her to accept "in a generous spirit". After the war, Paget didn't return to railway work and became increasingly hostile to his wife. Paget repeatedly told her that she had no right to live at Kings Newton Hall and that she was only a visitor, and he was "perpetually boasting of his infidelity".

He left his wife and Kings Newton Hall at the end of 1923, when his father died, and he inherited the baronetcy and his father's estates worth more than £155,000 (equivalent to £8,182,000 in 2025). When Lady Alexandra sent him a letter requesting a formal separation, Sir Cecil replied that it was better to get divorced, and wrote, "If you want evidence against me, you can inquire of the manager of the Sackville Hotel, Bexhill-on-Sea." A witness testified that Sir Cecil and a woman who claimed to be Lady Paget had spent the night together at the Sackville Hotel in the summer of 1924. The divorce petition was granted.

In 1927, Sir Cecil, 51, married the 34-year-old Florence Caroline, daughter of carpenter James Butt of Hackney, in a registrar's office in London. The wedding was described as "secret" and members of his family were unaware of the ceremony. He had no children by either wife.

He died suddenly in 1936 at Kings Newton Hall, aged 62. He was survived by his second wife, but without an heir, the baronetcy became extinct. He was buried in the family plot at Marlepit Hill cemetery, Sutton Bonington.

He left an estate of £207,935 (equivalent to £12,706,000 in 2025).

His widow remained at Kings Newton until her death in 1979, when it was sold to the Ottewell family.

== Footnotes ==
Baronetage of the United Kingdom
Preceded by Ernest Paget	Baronet (of Sutton Bonington); 1923–1936	Extinct
