= Sutton Bonington =

Village in Nottinghamshire, England

- Village and civil parish
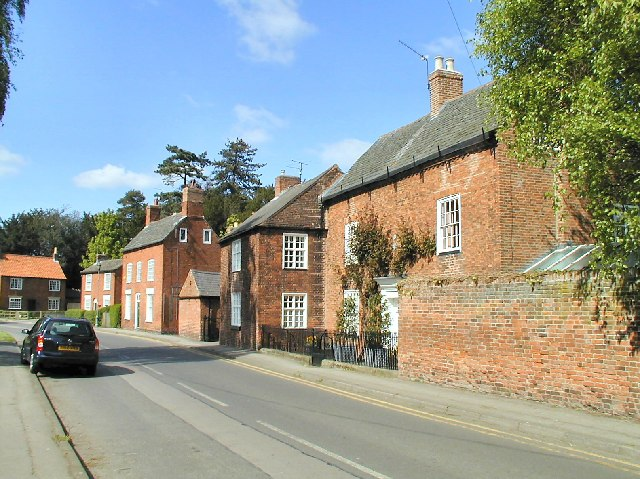
- Main Street

- Location within Nottinghamshire
- Interactive map of Sutton Bonington
- Area: 3.48 sq mi (9.0 km^{2})
- Population: 2,338 (2021 Census)
  - Density: 672/sq mi (259/km^{2})
- OS grid reference: SK 50469 25017
  - London: 115 mi (185 km) SSE
- District: Rushcliffe
- Shire county: Nottinghamshire
- Region: East Midlands
- Country: England
- Sovereign state: United Kingdom
- Settlements: Sutton Bonington; Zouch
- Post town: LOUGHBOROUGH
- Postcode district: LE12
- Dialling code: 01509
- Police: Nottinghamshire
- Fire: Nottinghamshire
- Ambulance: East Midlands
- UK Parliament: Rushcliffe
- Website: www.suttonboningtonparishcouncil.org.uk

Sutton Bonington (/ˈsʌtən ˈbɒnɪŋtən/) is a village and civil parish lying along the valley of the River Soar in the borough of Rushcliffe, south-west Nottinghamshire, England. The University of Nottingham has the Sutton Bonington Campus, a 420 hectares (4.2 km^{2}) site just to the north of the village.

The parish covers some 2,229 acres (9.02 km^{2}) and includes the hamlet of Zouch. The population at the 2011 census was 2,202, rising to 2,338 at the 2021 census. The River Soar is the county boundary with Leicestershire and approximately 2 miles (3.2 km) to the north-west, in Leicestershire, is the large village of Kegworth. The nearest town is Loughborough, some 5 miles (8.0 km) by road to the south, and the nearest village is Normanton on Soar.

== History ==
Originally, Sutton and Bonington were two settlements, probably originating in Anglo-Saxon times (the names likely derive from South farm and Buna's farm); Sutton was to the south of Bonington. In the Domesday Book of 1086 the villages were recorded as "Sudtone" and "Bonitone". The two villages gradually grew together along the edge of the flood plain of the River Soar to make one long, narrow village, which by 1340 had come by the name of "Sutton Bonynton".

Today it continues to be a linear village, with much of the 20th century housing built along and just off Park Lane, making the Sutton part now larger than the Bonington part. Sutton Bonington Hall's gardens and parkland are set between the two original settlements and create a gap in the built-up area, and each part continues to have its own pub and parish church. The most recent significant development are houses built on the former rectory gardens near St Anne's Church, again enlarging the Sutton part. The total length of the village is now 1.25 miles (2.01 km), not including the university campus.

The Midland Railway was constructed through the parish in 1840. Sir Cecil Paget, a notable locomotive engineer and railway administrator, was born in Sutton Bonington and in 1923 succeeded his father (Sir Ernest Paget, who was Chairman of the Midland Railway, 1890–1911) to become the 2nd Baronet Paget of Sutton Bonington. He died in 1936, without children (the title thereby becoming extinct), and was buried in the family plot at Marlepit Hill cemetery. The Paget family were the main landowners in the parish for much of the 19th century, owning the two ancient manors of St Anne and St Michael. It was under the Pagets that the current St Anne's Manor house and parkland was built, in 1848.

=== University ===
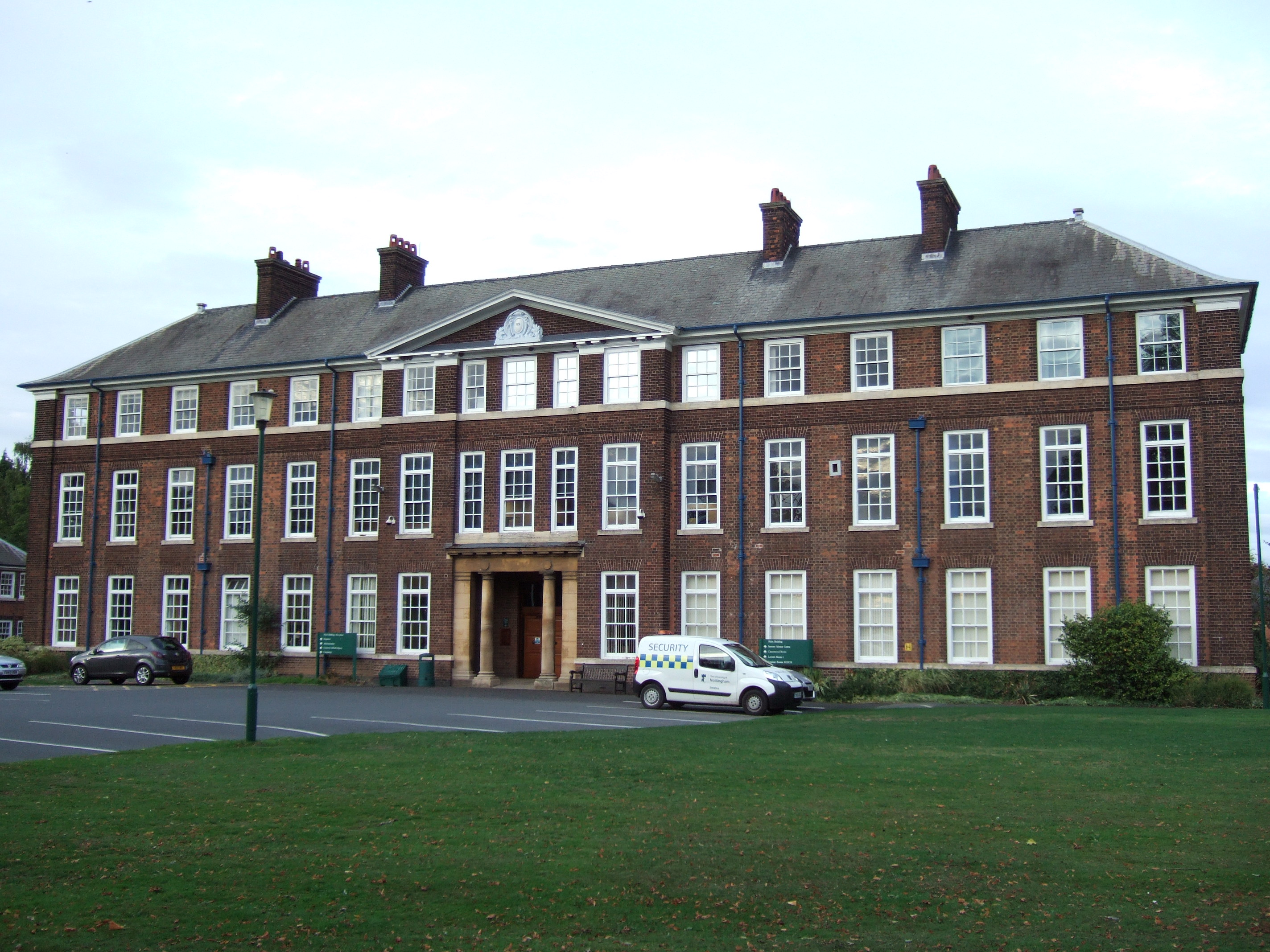
The front of the main (original) building of the former Agricultural & Dairy College, now part of the University of Nottingham.

The university campus was originally the Midland Agricultural and Dairy College, which formed in the first decades of the 20th century. The site was used as a prisoner of war camp during the First World War. In 1948 the college became part of the University of Nottingham.

The campus has steadily grown over the decades (the main part is now approximately 20 hectares) and in 2006 the School of Veterinary Medicine and Science opened. The residential aspect of the campus ("Bonington Halls" – it consists of a number of spread out halls and houses) has also grown substantially in recent years and is now managed by Campus Living Villages (CLV). A masterplan was created in 2008 for the campus and envisages its development over the coming years – growth at present is towards Landcroft Lane, whilst in the future a considerable expansion is planned northwards towards Melton Lane. In 2011 two new buildings were completed on the campus: the Gateway Building housing veterinary medicine and agricultural and environmental sciences (adjacent to the recently built veterinary sciences building) and the BioEnergy Centre which is a research centre for international brewing company SAB Miller. The campus also boasts an arboretum on its northwest side, mostly planted in the early twentieth century, which is used for teaching and research occasionally, as well as for recreation.

== Features and amenities ==
The village boasts a number of small shops, a Coffee shop, a post office, a village hall and library, a primary school, a doctor's surgery and two pubs: The Anchor (in the Bonington part) and The King's Head (in the Sutton part). A small industrial estate exists just outside the village on Rempstone Road.

The village also has two medieval churches, a result of the merging of the two original villages (Sutton and Bonington); they are St Michael's Church (Bonington's parish church, located on Main Street) and St Anne's Church (Sutton's church, located down St Anne's Lane). The village has a large conservation area at its heart, with 25 listed buildings contained within it. Sutton Bonington Hall and St Anne's Church are Grade II* (the remainder being Grade II). Sutton Bonington Hall is a country house largely erected in the Queen Anne period and is locally known as "The Hall". In 1825 it came into the ownership of the Paget family and remained a residence until 2000; it has since gone into commercial use as a location for weddings, conferences and parties. There is a Methodist church and a Baptist church in the Sutton part of the village.

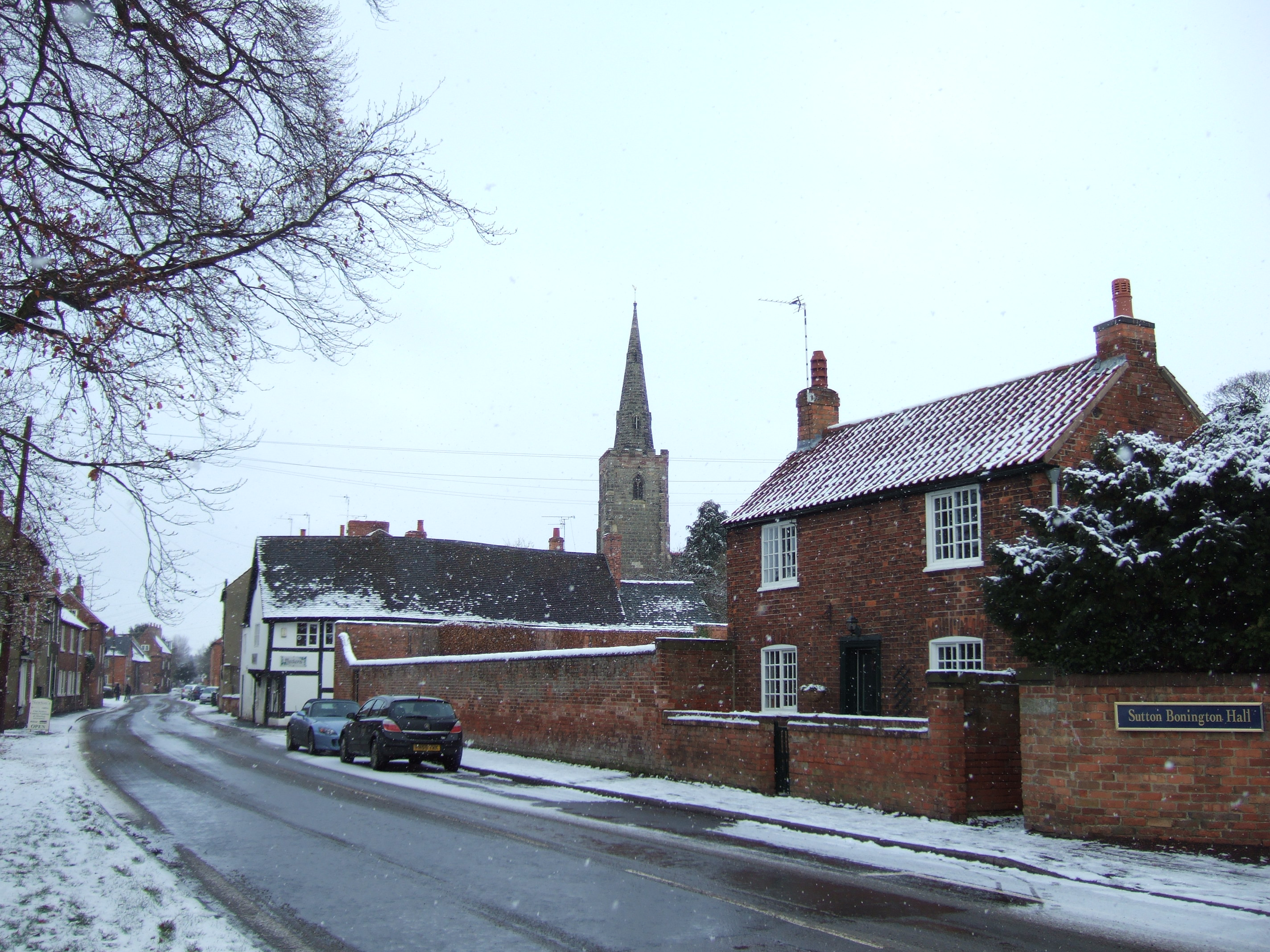
Main Street through Bonington, with the tower of St Michael's Church visible

Aside from the main village, the parish contains a number of outlying areas of settlement, including the university campus and the hamlet of Zouch. There are also two adjacent clusters of housing towards West Leake, at the junctions of Landcroft Lane/Melton Lane and Melton Lane/Pithouse Lane/Trowell Lane. Within the latter cluster is a 200-year-old public house called the Star Inn known locally as Pit House, the Victoria County History for Sutton Bonington states that "[i]t was also known as Pit House because it was used by miners from the gypsum ‘pits’." Between 1982 and 2004 specialist car manufacturer GTM Cars used buildings in Trowel Lane as their factory and offices. Since their departure to Coventry these were used by Talon Sportscars until July 2008.

In Zouch is the Rose and Crown pub. The Station Hotel was located adjacent to the former Kegworth railway station, lying just outwith the parish, but closed in 2011. Opposite the Hotel on Station Road are two further Listed buildings within the parish (in addition to the 25 in the village) at Sutton Fields – the House and its Lodge. The Kegworth Old Lock, replaced by the Kegworth Deep Lock in the mid-1980s, on the River Soar navigation, also lies within Sutton Bonington parish, and became Grade II Listed on 12 October 1987.

The Kingston Brook runs to the northeast of the parish, forming part of the boundary with West Leake parish. The boundary with Leicestershire is the River Soar and runs along the centre of the river. In places the river has more than one channel, and the boundary then runs at the centre of the widest channel of water, resulting in a number of islands falling within the parish, especially near Kegworth and at Zouch.

Adjacent to the main university campus is the University Farm, a 400 hectare (4 km^{2}) commercial research farm, and an associated high-technology dairy centre; the farm partly lies in the neighbouring parish of Kingston on Soar, as does the dairy. Between the university campus and the railway line are offices (formerly a residence called "The Elms") and a laboratory belonging to the Veterinary Laboratories Agency, and a new sports hall and associated pitches.

=== Sport ===
Sutton Bonington Cricket Club was founded in 1824. There is a lawn bowls club and a tennis club, both situated at the junction of Marle Pit Hill and Landcroft Lane. Sutton Bonington F.C. has 3 male teams that currently play in the Leicestershire Senior League, County league and Sunday Charnwood League, they are based at the Recreation Ground on Main Street.

A Kickboxing club (PKA - Sutton Bonington) is based in the Village hall.

== Transport ==
There were two railway stations close to the village: Kegworth station (closed in 1968) to the north and Hathern station (closed in 1960) to the south-east. In 2008, East Midlands Parkway station opened at Ratcliffe on Soar, approximately 3.5 miles (5.6 km) to the north, providing good links on the Midland Main Line which passes through the parish and on the eastern edge of the village in a cutting.

Junction 24 of the M1 motorway is only 2.5 miles (4.0 km) away, near Kegworth, and the East Midlands Airport is also nearby to the west. The A6006 Rempstone Road runs along the south-east boundary of the parish, and through Zouch, and leads to the A6.

Until 2023 Skylink bus route served the village and the university campus, with regular buses running between Nottingham city centre and Loughborough, including stops at Kegworth, the Airport, Long Eaton and Beeston.

Kinchbus operate the Nottinghamshire County Council funded demand responsive transport Zone4 services in the area, following the closure of Ct4n buses, Kinchbus will also be providing 4 return journeys into Loughborough on service 66 from 24 August.

The long-distance footpath, the Midshires Way, passes through the parish, running from West Leake to Kegworth along Melton Lane and Station Road. Two of the country lanes in the parish (Landcroft Lane and Hungary Lane) were designated as quiet lanes in 2004, giving equal priority between vehicular traffic and pedestrians, cyclists and horse riders. The River Soar, which runs through Zouch and then along the western boundary of the parish, is canalised and is well used by small watercraft.

== Local government and elections ==
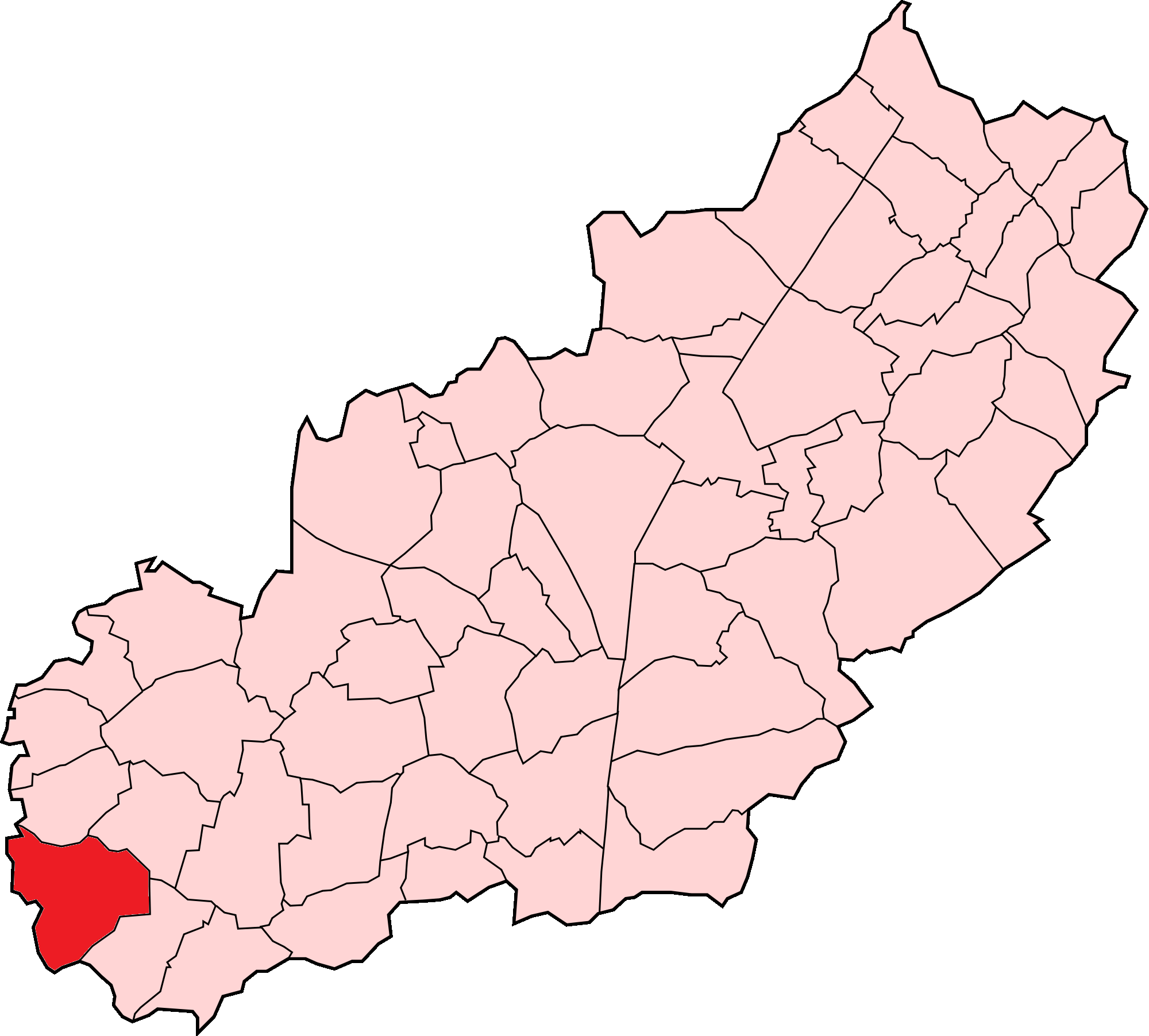
The civil parish (red) shown with the other parishes in the borough of Rushcliffe

The parish comes within the Soar Valley electoral district for purposes of electing a councillor to Nottinghamshire County Council. The most recent election was in 2009 when Linda Sykes, of the Conservative party, won the seat. For the election of a councillor to Rushcliffe Borough Council, the parish forms part of the Soar Valley ward, which covers a smaller area than the electoral district of the same name, and consists of the three parishes of Sutton Bonington, Kingston on Soar and Ratcliffe on Soar. The most recent election was in 2007 when Terry Holt, of the Liberal Democrats, won the seat. The next Borough election will be held in 2011.

The parish council has 11 councillors; there was an uncontested election for these seats in 2007.

The parish falls within the parliamentary constituency of Rushcliffe.

=== Historic local government ===
The parish fell within the ancient Rushcliffe wapentake of Nottinghamshire. The two ancient ecclesiastical parishes of Sutton and Bonington were also separate townships; they were united for civil purposes in 1829 and combined in 1923 into one ecclesiastical parish. Related to the situation of the two original parishes, Sutton and Bonington are separate manors, named after their churches – St Anne and St Michael respectively. From 1894 the parish was part of the Leake Rural District, until its abolition in 1935, when the parish was transferred to the Basford Rural District. In 1974 Basford Rural District was abolished and the non-metropolitan district of Rushcliffe was created, granted with borough status immediately, with Sutton Bonington becoming a part of it.

== People from Sutton Bonington ==
- Sir (George) Ernest Paget, 1st Baronet (1841–1923) Chairman of the Midland Railway Company (MR) 1890–1911.
- Sir Cecil Paget CMG, DSO, 2nd Baronet (19 October 1874 – 9 December 1936) British locomotive engineer and railway administrator.
- Godfrey Elton, 1st Baron Elton, (29 March 1892 – 18 April 1973) British historian.
- Rodney Elton, 2nd Baron Elton, (born 2 March 1930) British politician and Conservative member of the House of Lords.
- Thomas Pierrepoint, executioner.

== Weather station ==
Since 1908 Sutton Bonington has had an official (Met Office listed) automatic weather monitoring station situated on the university campus. The station is at 48m ASL just off Landcroft Lane at 52.8282°N 1.2485°W.

== Gallery ==
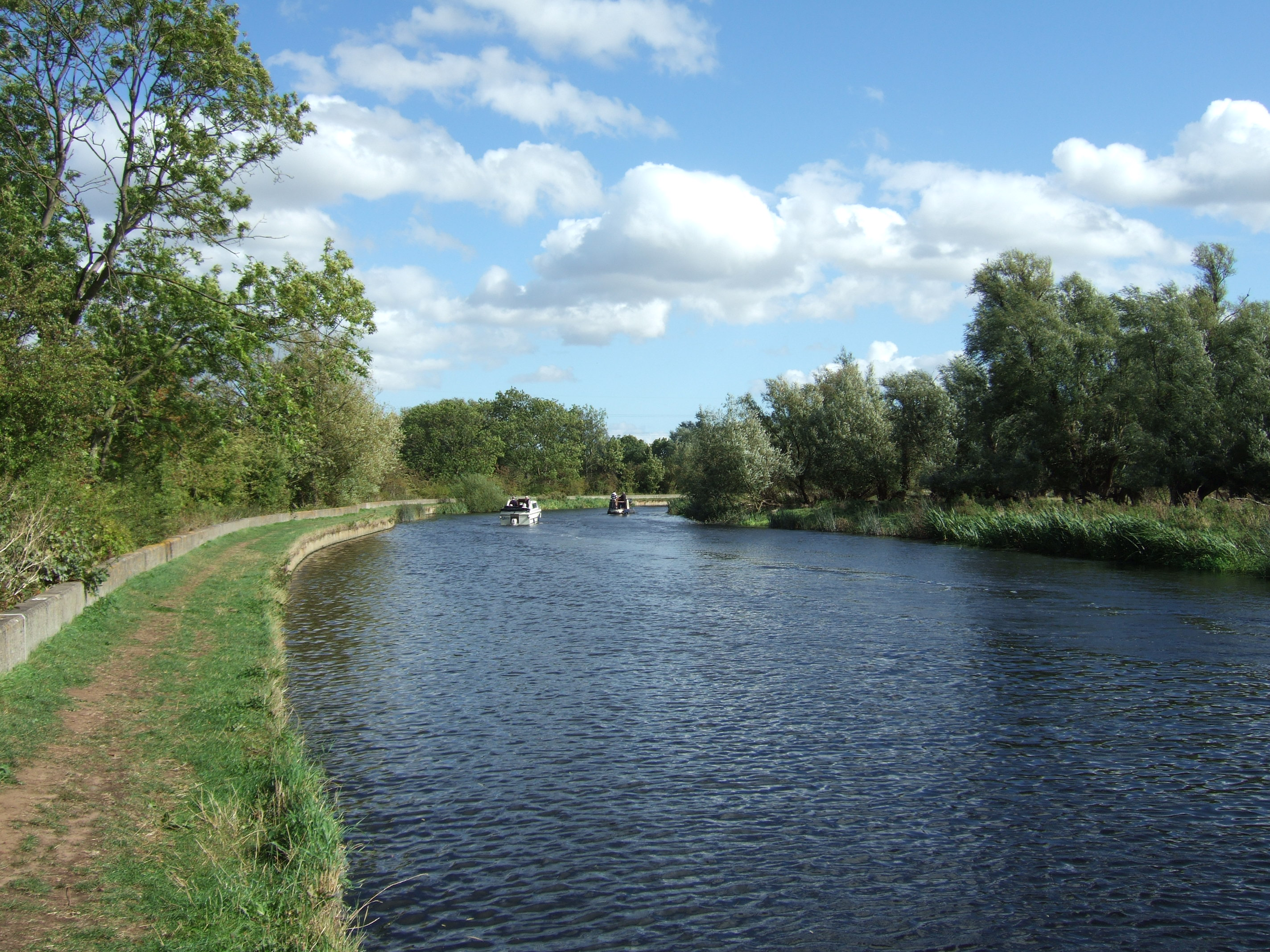
Boats navigating the River Soar near Sutton Bonington - the left towpath side is Nottinghamshire, with Leicestershire to the right.

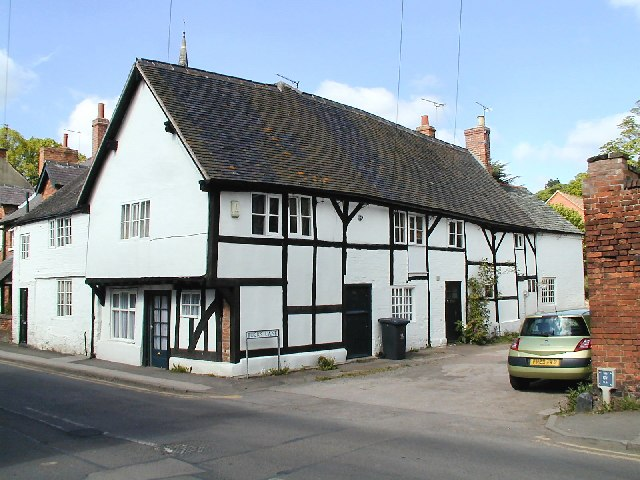
The entrance to Buck's Lane.

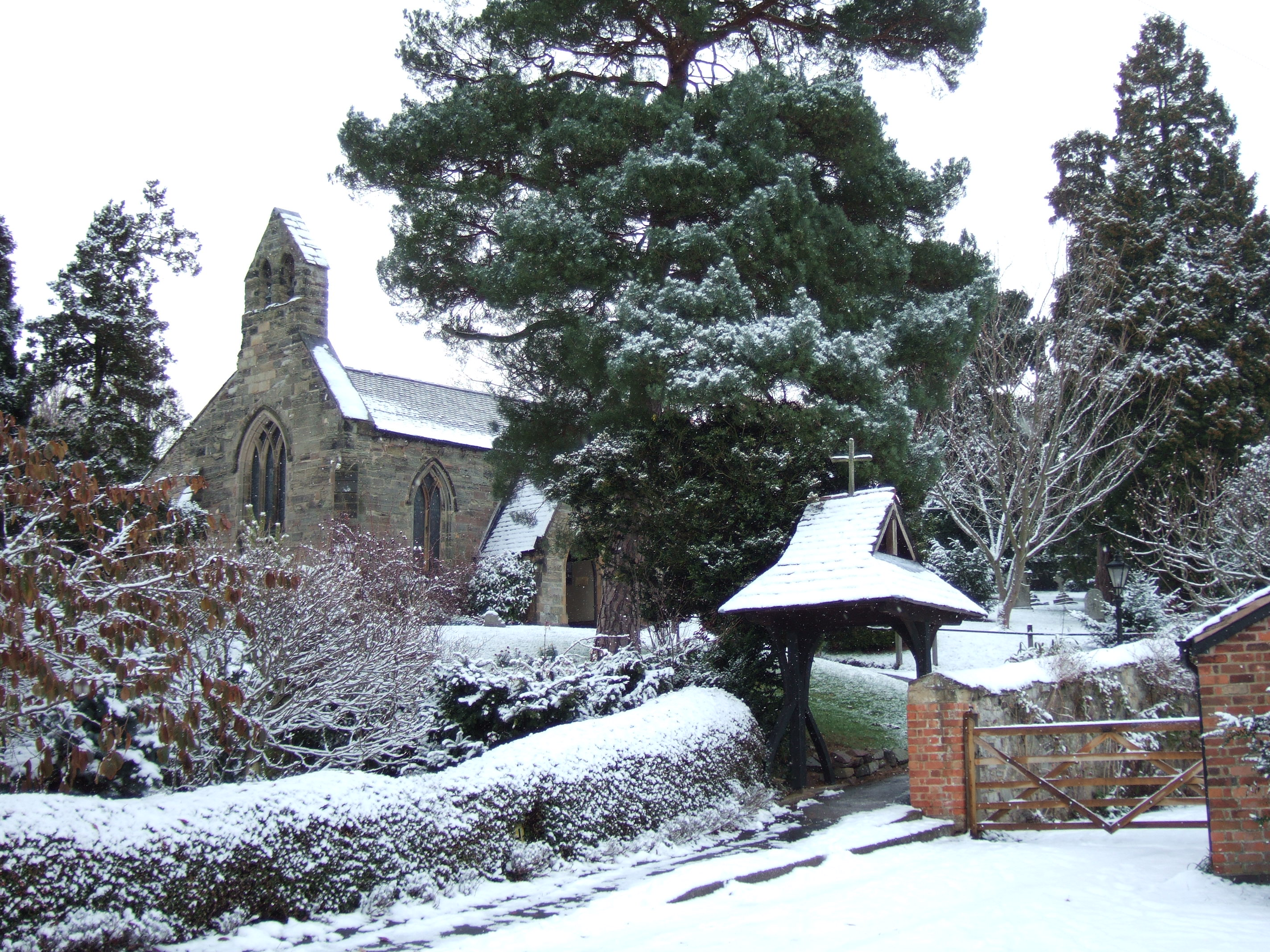
St Anne's Church at the end of St Anne's Lane.

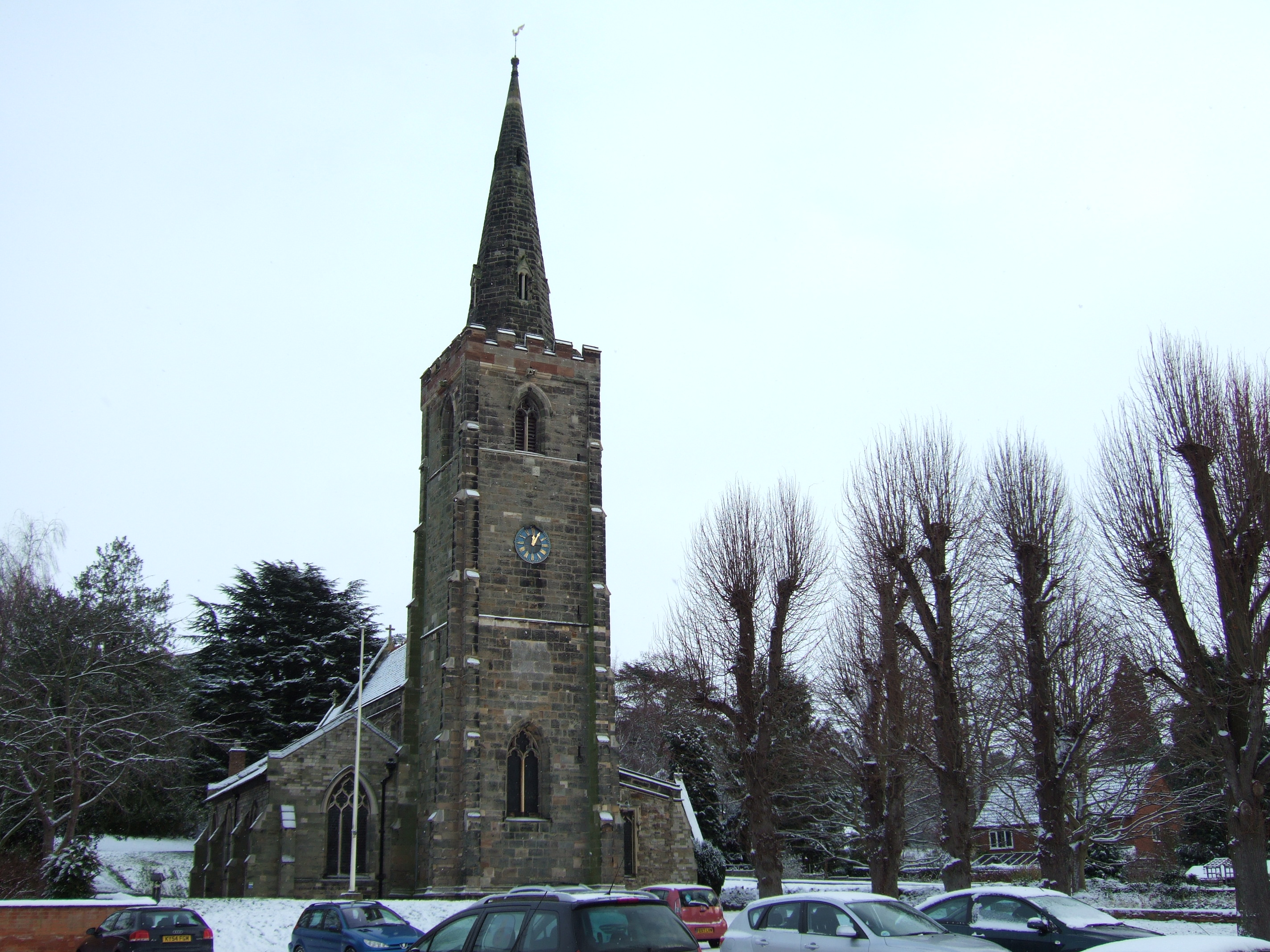
St Michael's Church, viewed from Main Street.

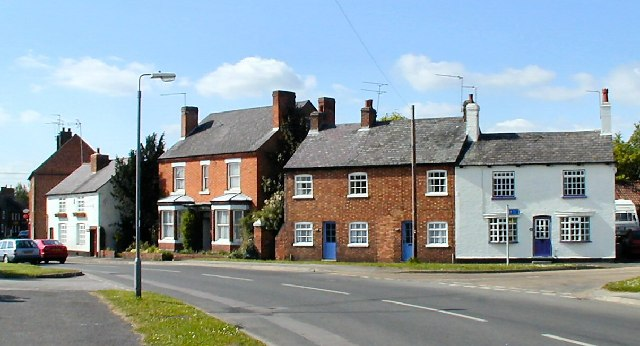
At the corner of Main Street and Hungary Lane.

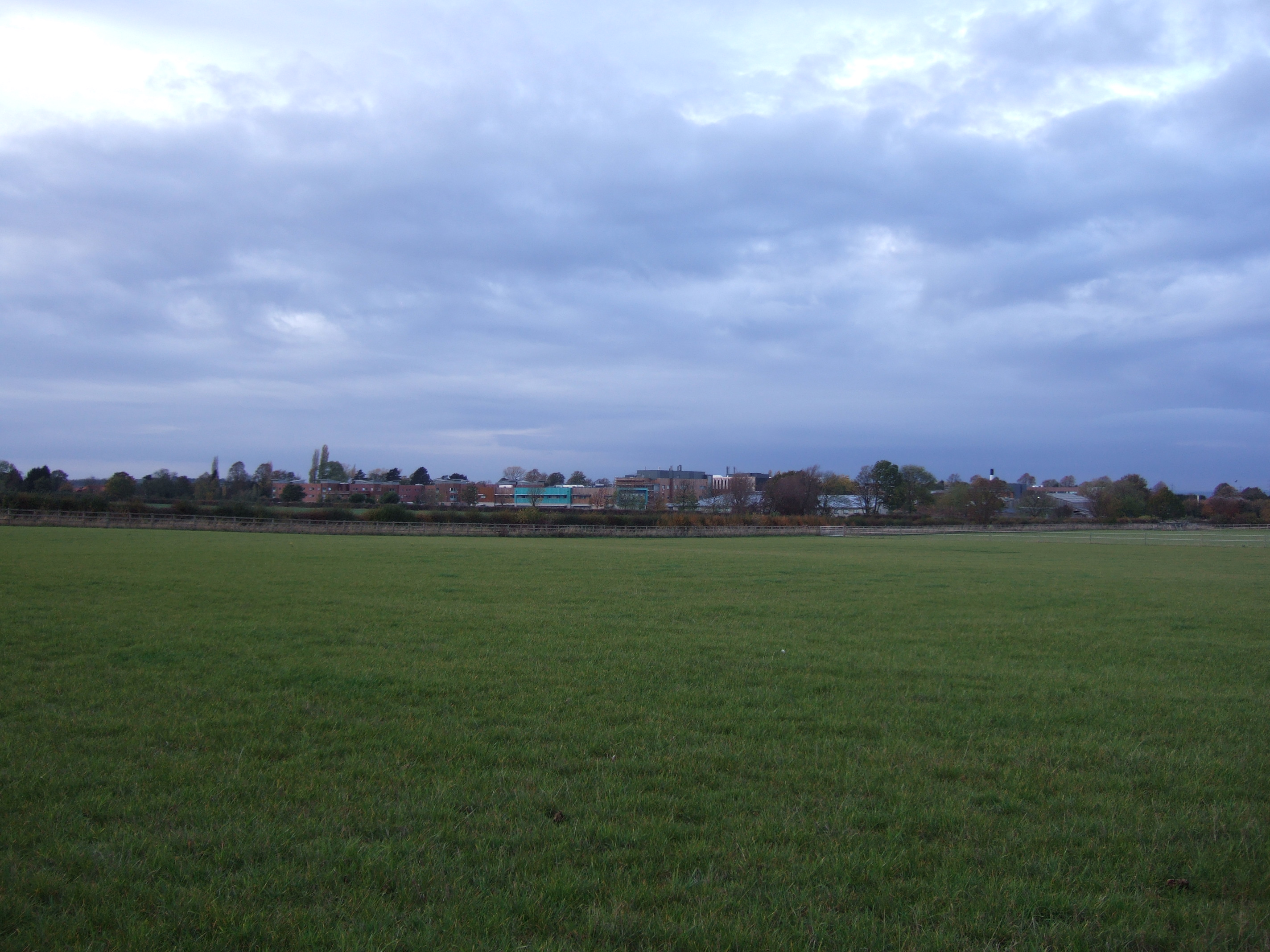
The university campus viewed from the south.

== See also ==
- Listed buildings in Sutton Bonington
