= Midland Railway Paget locomotive =

British eight-cylinder 2-6-2 locomotive

Paget
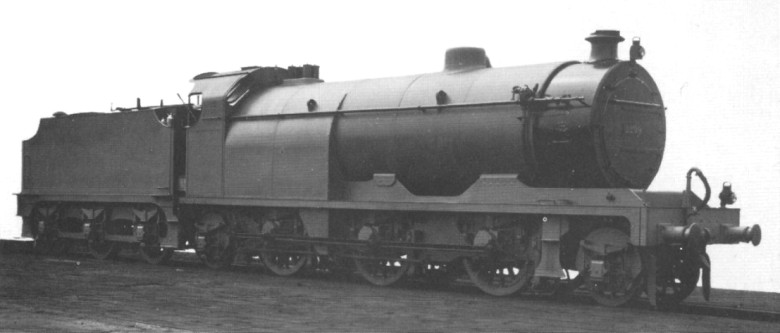
- The only known official photograph of the Paget locomotive is this official portrait.
Type and origin
- Power type: Steam
- Designer: Cecil Walter Paget
- Builder: Midland Railway Derby Works
- Build date: 1908
Specifications
- Configuration
  - Whyte: 2-6-2
  - UIC: 1′C1′ n8
- Leading dia.: 3 ft 3 1/2 in (1,003 mm)
- Driver dia.: 5 ft 4 in (1,626 mm)
- Trailing dia.: 3 ft 3 1/2 in (1,003 mm)
- Wheelbase: Coupled: 17 ft 4 in (5.28 m); Locomotive: 31 ft 4 in (9.55 m)
- Adhesive weight: 59 long tons 6 cwt (132,800 lb or 60.3 t); 59 long tons 6 hundredweight (60.3 t; 66.4 short tons)
- Loco weight: 74 long tons 10 cwt (166,900 lb or 75.7 t); 74 long tons 10 hundredweight (75.7 t; 83.4 short tons)
- Boiler pressure: 180 lbf/in^{2} (1.24 MPa)
- Cylinders: 8 single-acting
- Cylinder size: 18 in × 12 in (457 mm × 305 mm)
Performance figures
- Tractive effort: 18,590 lbf (82.69 kN)
Career
- Operators: Midland Railway
- Numbers: 2299
- Locale: United Kingdom
- Scrapped: 1918

The Midland Railway's Paget locomotive, No. 2299, was an experimental steam locomotive constructed at its Derby Works in 1908 to the design of the General Superintendent Cecil Paget (though Richard Deeley was Locomotive Superintendent at the time). As the Midland shrouded the locomotive in secrecy, there is only one known official photograph, which was not released until after The Grouping of 1923.

== Overview ==
The locomotive had a total of eight uniflow cylinders arranged in two groups of four placed between the 1st and 2nd and 2nd and 3rd driving axles, with rotary steam distribution valves placed over each; a bronze sleeve in the valve body was rotated to control cutoff. Two were connected to the forward pair of the six driving wheels. Four were connected, two each side to the centre pair, with the final two behind the last pair. These drove a jackshaft which operated and reversed the valves, and cut off was controlled by rotary sleeves. The boiler was large and had an unusual integral firebox, lined with firebricks. Two-wheel pony trucks were fitted front and rear. It was the first 2-6-2 tender locomotive in Great Britain and would be the only one until the LNER Class V2 of 1936.

== Finance ==
Paget had initially financed it himself but eventually ran out of money, thus the railway made up for the difference. There had been a history on the railway's of a distrust of new ideas and Paget and Deeley were not on good terms, with Lowe suggesting a great hostility to it.

== Problems ==
It had problems with seizing of the phosphor bronze sleeves in the cast iron steam chest, with leakage in the glands and piston rings. In 1912, one of the rotary valves seized while on a test run, the engine blocking the main line for seven hours. As a result, it was put in store at Derby and was broken up in 1918, while Paget was in France commanding the Royal Engineers Railway Operating Division.
