= Listed buildings in Sutton Bonington =

Sutton Bonington is a civil parish in the Rushcliffe district of Nottinghamshire, England. The parish contains 30 listed buildings that are recorded in the National Heritage List for England. Of these, three are listed at Grade II*, the middle of the three grades, and the others are at Grade II, the lowest grade. The parish contains the village of Sutton Bonington and the surrounding area. Most of the listed buildings are houses, cottages and associated structures, and the others include two churches, a former school, farm buildings, a disused canal lock, a former framework knitter's workshop, and a telephone kiosk.

== Key ==
Grade	Criteria
II*	Particularly important buildings of more than special interest
II	Buildings of national importance and special interest

== Buildings ==
Name and location	Photograph	Date	Notes	Grade
St Anne's Church; 52.82058°N 1.24847°W		13th century	The church has been altered and extended through the centuries, including restorations in the 19th and early 20th centuries. It is built in stone with slate roofs, and consists of a nave, a north aisle, a south porch, a chancel, and a north vestry. At the west end is a gabled bellcote with two arches. The porch is gabled and has an arched opening with a chamfered surround, above which is a quatrefoil, it contains stone benches, and the inner doorway is arched, with a moulded surround and a hood mould..	II*
St Michael's Church; 52.82407°N 1.25309°W		13th century	The church has been altered and extended through the centuries, including restorations in the 19th century. It is built in stone with roofs of slate and lead, and consists of a nave with a clerestory, north and south aisles, a south porch, a chancel, a north organ chamber, and a west steeple. The steeple has a tower with three stages, buttresses, a chamfered plinth with a moulded band, a two-light window and a clock face on the west side, stair lights, and two-light bell openings with hood moulds, above which is a band with gargoyles, an embattled parapet, and a recessed spire with two tiers of lucarnes.	II*
Old walling and doorway, 6 Park Lane; 52.81788°N 1.24685°W		13th century	In the garden is a stone wall extending for about 20 metres (66 ft). This contains a re-set medieval doorway with a pointed arch anda a chamfered surorund.	II
92A Main Street and 1 Bucks Lane; 52.82339°N 1.25323°W		Mid 17th century	A house, later a shop and a cottage, it is timber framed, rendered and whitewashed in parts, on a partial plinth, with a tile roof. There are two storeys, the upper storey of the front facing Main street is jettied, and on Bucks Lane are three bays. The windows are a mix of casements and horizontally-sliding sashes.	II
118 Main Street and outbuilding 52.82468°N 1.25424°W		Mid 17th century	The house is in whitewashed brick on a plinth, with floor bands, and a slate roof with brick coped gables and kneelers. There are two storeys and attics, three bays, and a rear wing. The central doorway has a fanlight, and above it is a blocked window. The windows in the ground floor are sashes, and the upper floor contains tripartite casements with segmental heads. Projecting on the left is a single-storey single-bay outbuilding with dentilled eaves, a pantile roof, and a single window.	II
143 Main Street, cottage and chapel 52.82463°N 1.25447°W		Mid 17th century	The house, cottage and chapel have been combined into one house and a garage. The house is in red brick on a rendered stone plinth, with some blue brick chequering, raised dentilled floor bands, an eaves band, and a slate roof with stone coped gables and kneelers. There are two storeys and an attic, three bays, and a rear wing. The middle bay contains two-light stair casement windows, and in the outer bays are tripartite horizontally-sliding sash windows. To the right is the cottage dating from the early 19th century, with two storeys and two bays, and further to the right is the former chapel, dated 1832. This has two storeys and three bays and a pantile roof. Facing the road is a coped gable with a band forming a pediment. In the centre is a doorway, this is flanked by fixed lights, and above are sash windows, all with brick wedge lintels. Above the door is an inscribed and dated plaque.	II
1 Soar Lane; 52.82568°N 1.25530°W		Mid 17th century	The house is timber framed with brick nogging, and some stone and render, on a deep stone plinth, and has a tile roof. There are two storeys and an attic, the upper storey jettied, and a front to the road of three bays. Most of the windows are horizontally-sliding sash windows, there are some casements, and the bressummer is dated. On the left is a rendered lean-to.	II
6 and 8 Park Lane; 52.81772°N 1.24694°W		Late 17th century (probably)	A house, probably reusing earlier material, later divided into two, in stone on a chamfered plinth, with a slate roof and an orb finial on the left gable. There are two storeys and four bays, and two unequal gabled ranges back-to-back. Most of the windows are horizontally-sliding sashes, on the front are two panels, and in the right gable is a carved human head.	II
The Hollies; 52.82537°N 1.25510°W	—	1704	The house is in red brick with some blue brick chequering, a floor band, dogtooth eaves and a slate roof. There are two storeys and three bays. The central doorway has a moulded surround, a fanlight and a bracketed hood, and the windows are sashes. In the right gable are initials and the date in blue brick.	II
Old School House and outbuildings 52.82413°N 1.25220°W		c. 1719	The schoolroom and school house, later a private house, in red brick on a stone plinth, a floor band, and slate roofs with brick coped gables and kneelers. There are two stoeys and three bays. Above the central doorway is an inacribed plaque, and the windows aer a mix of sashes and casements. Projecting from the left is a single-storey two-bay wing, and to the left is a lower single-bay extension. From the right, and projecting, is a two-storey two-bay wing containing a segmental-arched doorway.	II
Barn, 143A Main Street; 52.82440°N 1.25435°W		Early 18th century	The barn is in red brick, with some blue brick, stone and render, on a brick and rendered plinth, with a band, and a tile roof with brick coped gables and kneelers. In the centre is a large doorway flanked by pilaster buttresses, and to the right is a lean-to.	II
Sutton Boningto Hall; 52.82286°N 1.25251°W		Early 18th century	A small country house in red brick on a stone plinth, with stone dressings, chamfered quoins, a decorative coved cornice, and a hipped slate roof. There are two storeys and attics and an L-shaped plan, with a main range of five bays, and a two-storey single-bay extension on the left. The central doorway has a moulded surround and a broken segmental pediment containing a coat of arms. The windows are sashes with quoined surrounds, and in the attic are two gabled dormers. The garden front has three bays, in the left bay is a two-storey bow window, and to its right is a three-bay arcaded porch, above which is a balustrade. Attached to the right is a conservatory with seven gabled bays.	II*
92 Main Street; 52.82341°N 1.25334°W		Mid 18th century	A cottage in rendered and whitewashed brick and some stone, with a tile roof. There are two storeys and two bays. In the left bay is a doorway, and the windows are horizontally-sliding sashes.	II
Peel Cottage; 52.82366°N 1.25379°W		Mid 18th century	The house, which was later extended, is in red brick, the right bay on a stone plinth, with dentilled eaves and a slate roof. There are two storeys, two bays, and a rear lean-to. On the front are tripartite horizontally-sliding sash windows under segmental arches.	II
Pigeoncote, 145 Main Street; 52.82498°N 1.25560°W	—	Late 18th century	The pigeoncote is in red brick, with a floor band, dentilled eaves, and a pyramidal slate roof. There is a single storey and a loft, and a single bay. It contains a doorway with a stable door under a segmental arch, and above are pigeonholes, most of which are blocked.	II
Old Lock, River Soar; 52.83657°N 1.27120°W		Late 18th century	The canal lock was built for the Loughborough Navigation on the River Soar. The chamber is in stone, with some brick patching, and there were wood and iron gates. The lock is unused and has been filled in.	II
Stable Block, Sutton Bonington Hall; 52.82334°N 1.25199°W		Late 18th century	The stable block is in red brick with stone dressings, a cornice, a floor band, and a hipped slate roof. There are two storeys and eleven bays containing round-headed arcading with imposts. The middle bay projects lightly, it is wider and taller, with an attic and an open pediment. It contains an elliptical-headed doorway, above which is a tripartite horizontally-sliding sash window and a semicircular window. The outer bays contain doorways and casement windows in recessed round-arched recesses.	II
The Dower House; 52.82140°N 1.25139°W		Late 18th century	The house is in red brick with dentilled eaves and a slate roof. There are two storeys and an attic, and three bays. In the centre is a doorway with a reeded surround and a bracketed hood, and the windows are sashes with segmental heads. To the left is a projecting two-storey single-bay extension containing tripartite cross casement windows.	II
The White House, wall and railings 52.82509°N 1.25489°W		Late 18th century	The house is in whitewashed brick on a stone plinth, with quoins, a floor band, a cornice and a blocking course, and a hipped slate roof. There are three storeys and a main range of three bays, to the right and recessed is a two-storey single-bay wing, and at the rear is a two-storey two-bay wing. The doorway has a reeded surround, a decorative fanlight, and a hood on decorative brackets. The windows are sashes, those in the ground floor are tripartite under segmental arches. The garden front has a two-storey bow window, and along the front of the house is a low brick wall with decorative iron railings.	II
65 Main Street; 52.82037°N 1.25136°W		1778	The house is in red brick with dentilled eaves and a slate roof. There are three storeys and three bays. The central doorway has a reeded surround, a fanlight, and a hood on brackets. The windows in the lower two floors are cross casements with segmental heads, and the top floor contains horizontally-sliding sashes with flat heads.	II
78 and 80 Main Street; 52.82166°N 1.25151°W		1779	A house later divided into two, in red brick, with dentilled eaves and a slate roof. There are two storeys and an attic, and three bays. The central doorway has a segmental head and a fanlight, and is flanked by sash windows with rendered lintels. In the centre of the upper floor is a cross casement window, and the outer bays contain horizontally-sliding sashes, all with segmental heads. In the left gable wall are bricks inscribed with the date and initials.	II
40 Main Street; 52.81990°N 1.24964°W	—	Early 19th century	A red brick house with dentilled eaves and a slate roof. There are two storeys and attics, and three bays. The central doorway has a hood, the windows in the lower two floors are sashes, and the top floor contains casements.	II
82 and 84 Main Street; 52.82183°N 1.25156°W		Early 19th century	A house later divided into two, in red brick, with dogtooth eaves and a pantile roof. There are two storeys and three bays. In the centre is a round-headed doorway with a blind fanlight. The windows are sashes, those in the ground floor with rendered wedge lintels.	II
86 Main Street; 52.82201°N 1.25172°W		Early 19th century	A red brick house with dentilled eaves and a pantile roof. There are two storeys and three bays. The central doorway has a decorative fanlight, to its left is a casement window, and the other windows are horizontally-sliding sashes. The windows in the ground floor have painted wedge lintels.	II
119 Main Street; 52.82327°N 1.25348°W		Early 19th century	A house later used for other purposes, in red brick, rendered on the left gable, with dogtooth eaves and a pantile roof. There are three storeys and two bays. In the left bay is a shop window with panelled pilaster strips and an entablature, below which is a decorative wooden panel. To the right and in the middle floor are horizontally-sliding sash windows under segmental arches, and the top floor contains casement windows.	II
Hall Cottage; 52.82307°N 1.25302°W	—	Early 19th century	The cottage is in red brick with a pantile roof, two storeys and three bays. It has a central doorway, and horizontally-sliding sash windows, those in the ground floor with segmental heads.	II
Former framework knitter's workshop 52.82179°N 1.25133°W	—	Mid 19th century	The former workshop behind 80 Main Street is in red brick with a slate roof. There are two storeys and four bays. In the ground floor are doorways and fixed lights under a continuous lintel, and the upper floor contains large casement windows.	II
The Cedars and Sutton Fields House; 52.83472°N 1.25899°W	—	1875	A large house divided into two, it is in stone, and has a slate roof with a decorative ridge. The garden front has two storeys and a cellar, and ten bays, four bays projecting slightly and gabled. It is on a plinth, and has a decorative eaves, and a decorative parapet. The outer bays have an attic, buttresses, and mock turrets on corbels, with decorative capitals and conical pinnacles. There are two arched doorways and arched tripartite sash windows that have colonettes with decorative capitals and shaped hood moulds. At the rear is a gabled porch and an arched doorway with a moulded surround and colonnettes.	II
Lodge, Sutton Fields House; 52.83545°N 1.26011°W	—	c. 1875	The lodge is in stone, with dressings in terracotta and stone, a sill band, a raised eaves band, and a slate roof with coped gables and finials. There is a single storey and attics, and two gabled bays. The windows are sashes, over which are decorative terracotta panels with pointed arches. In the apex of the right bay are three small narrow decorated panels.	II
Telephone kiosk 52.82556°N 1.25494°W		1935	The K6 type telephone kiosk on Marplepit Hill was designed by Giles Gilbert Scott. Constructed in cast iron with a square plan and a dome, it has three unperforated crowns in the top panels.	II
