= William Speechly =

English horticulturist

William Speechly (1735 – 1 October 1819) was a late 18th- and early 19th-century English horticulturist, best known as the head gardener to William Henry Cavendish-Bentinck, 3rd Duke of Portland, and for his skill in growing pineapples and grapes.

== Biography ==
=== Early life ===
William Speechly was born near Peterborough, Northamptonshire, probably the second son (baptised 25 February 1735) of Ralph Speechly, a butcher and grazier of Orton Longueville, Huntingdonshire, and his wife Sarah Blackwell.

He was said to have had a good education and showed an early interest in horticulture, engraving sketches of fruit, flowers, and designs on copper plates.

Speechly served an apprenticeship as a gardener at the estate of William Fitzwilliam, 4th Earl Fitzwilliam, at Milton Abbey, Northamptonshire. He was subsequently employed by Frederick Howard, 5th Earl of Carlisle at Castle Howard, North Yorkshire and then as head gardener to Sir William St Quintin, 4th Baronet at Scampston Hall, Yorkshire. In 1767 he became head gardener to William Henry Cavendish-Bentinck, the 3rd Duke of Portland at Welbeck Abbey in Nottinghamshire.

=== At Welbeck Abbey ===
In 1771 Bentinck sent Speechly on a tour of gardens in Holland where it is thought he learned about the design of stoves for hothouses, which he later improved on. In 1776 Bentinck asked him to write a description of the method of planting trees on the Nottinghamshire estates for Alexander Hunter's edition of John Evelyn's Silva. This later appeared as an article in Hunter's Georgical Essays (1803), in which Speechly also contributed a note on the possibility of raising pineapples.

Speechly established the first effective system for the cultivation of pineapples in England. He was particularly concerned that they should not be kept at too hot a temperature in the winter and experimented with forcing pineapples in beds of oak leaves instead of the comparatively expensive and unpredictable tanner's bark. In 1779 he published a Treatise on the Culture of the Pine Apple.

This was followed in 1790 by a Treatise on the Culture of the Vine, which described 50 species of grapes, and discussed hothouse culture, the construction and management of vineyards in open air, pruning, irrigation, grafting, insect and blight control. The work was organised in four books: the first presenting an annotated list of 50 grape varieties, and discussing the management of the vine in the hothouse; the second on the vinery and including observations on pruning and watering; the third covering grafting, insect control, and remarks on the age and size attained by vines; and the fourth on vineyards. Both works were republished in one volume in 1820.

In 1797 Sir John Sinclair, president of the Board of Agriculture, asked Speechly to prepare sections on gardening and domestic rural economy for a comprehensive work on agriculture. But the project was laid aside in 1798, and in 1800 Speechly's manuscript was returned to him at his own request. He then began writing A General Treatise on Gardening.

=== Later life ===
In 1801 following the death of his younger son, Speechly left Welbeck Abbey to take over management of his son's farm at Woodborough Hall, Nottinghamshire. He was succeeded by his pupil, Joseph Thompson, then gardener to the late Lord John Cavendish, Northamptonshire.
During this time he neglected his manuscript on rural economy, but on his retirement to King's Newton Hall, near Melbourne, Derbyshire, he completed and enlarged it. This work, devoted to the management of cottage gardens, was published in 1820, with several other essays appended, under the title Practical Hints on Domestic and Rural Economy.
He received the honorary medal of the Board of Agriculture for his essays on agriculture.
Speechly died on 1 October 1819 aged 86 at Great Milton, Oxfordshire, while living with his only surviving child Sarah and her husband John Stevenson, a surgeon.

== Family ==
Speechly married Mary Chell, on 22 May 1771, at St George, Hanover Square, London and they had at least four children including two sons, William Griffin Speechly (a partner in a nursery firm, Withers and Speechly at Newark upon Trent, Nottinghamshire, who died in 1804) and John (who died at Woodborough Hall, Nottinghamshire in 1800) and two daughters Mary and Sarah (baptised at Cuckney, Nottinghamshire respectively on 14 July 1779 and 4 December 1781).
His wife Mary died at Great Milton, Oxfordshire on 28 November 1818.

== Publications ==
- A Treatise on the cultivation of the Pine-Apple, and the management of the Hot-house; together with a description of every species of Insect that infects Hot-Houses with effectual methods of destroying them. York. 1779. 2nd Edition. 1796.
- A Treatise on the culture of the Vine, exhibiting new and advantageous methods of propagating, cultivating, and training that plant, so as to render it abundantly fruitful. With new hints on the formation of Vineyards in England. York. 1790.
- Practical Hints on Domestic and Rural Economy relating partly to the utility, formation and management of Fruit, Kitchen, and Cottage Gardens and Orchards, &c. London, 1820
