= Kegworth railway station =

Former railway station in Nottinghamshire, England

Coordinates: 52°50′8.00″N 1°15′28.00″W

Kegworth
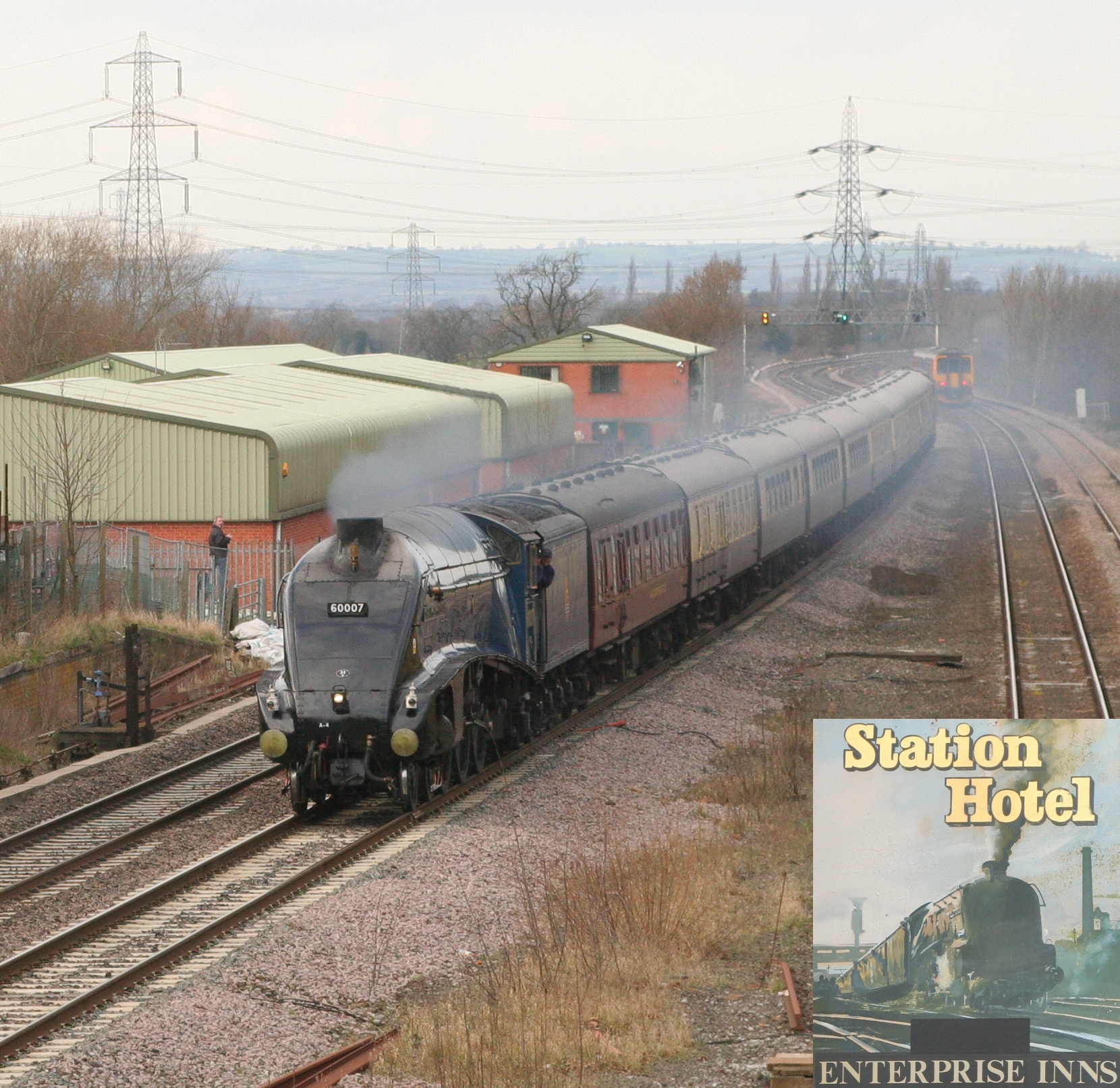
- Ex-LNER Class A4 No. 60007 Sir Nigel Gresley, passing through the remains of Kegworth station on 28 February 2009

General information
- Location: Kingston on Soar, Rushcliffe; England
- Platforms: 2

Other information
- Status: Disused

History
- Original company: Midland Counties Railway
- Pre-grouping: Midland Railway
- Post-grouping: London, Midland and Scottish Railway

Key dates
- 5 May 1840: Station opened
- 4 March 1968: Closed
Location

Kegworth railway station located in Nottinghamshire was a station serving the villages of Kegworth, Leicestershire, Sutton Bonington, and Kingston on Soar, Nottinghamshire.

== History ==
It was opened in 1840 for the Midland Counties Railway, which shortly joined the North Midland Railway and the Birmingham and Derby Junction Railway to form the Midland Railway.

This line is now part of the Midland Main Line between Loughborough and East Midlands Parkway railway station.

It was built in the typical MCR fashion, with the main building positioned at a higher level and steps leading down onto the platform. It closed in 1968 and only the station house and the goods shed remain. Until 1971 there was a standard gauge mineral railway between the main line and New Kingston gypsum mine.

There has been local pressure to open it. However a new station, East Midlands Parkway has now been built at Ratcliffe-on-Soar. Currently only taxis serve to connect it to the nearby East Midlands Airport, forcing the majority of people to use the Skylink (bus service) from Nottingham, Loughborough, Leicester or Derby, but with improvements to the Erewash Valley Line has the potential to be a hub for local services from Nottingham and Derby to connect with a high speed service from London to Sheffield and the North.

== Station masters ==
- John Sykes ca. 1846 - 1853 (emigrated to Australia)
- John Beckwith 1853 - ???? (formerly of the Leicestershire County Police Force)
- Joseph Kilby 1860 - 1863
- John Antill 1863 - 1864
- S. Hudson 1864 - ????
- Robert Cross 1868 - 1895
- H.L. Bailey 1895 - 1900 (afterwards station master at Bath)
- Charles Ravenhall 1900 - 1905 (formerly station master at Borrowash, afterwards station master at Oakham)
- John Lewis Shannon 1905 - 1908 (formerly station master at Rearsby, afterwards assistant station master at Derby)
- William E. Coates 1908 - 1921 (formerly station master at Millers Dale, afterwards station master at Loughborough)
- William Horace Yates 1921 - ????
- W.E. Turner 1931 - ???? (formerly station master at Sharnbrook)
- E.G. Dilley 1943 - 1953 (formerly station master at Oakley, afterwards station master at Oakham)
- H.R. Leddra ca. 1959
- C.D. Gower ca. 1965

Preceding station	Historical railways	Following station
Hathern; Line open, station closed	Midland Railway; Midland Main Line	Long Eaton; Line and station open
Hathern; Line open, station closed	Midland Railway; Midland Main Line	Trent; Line open, station closed
