= Hathern railway station =

Former railway station in Nottinghamshire, England

Coordinates: 52.8107°N 1.2367°W

Hathern
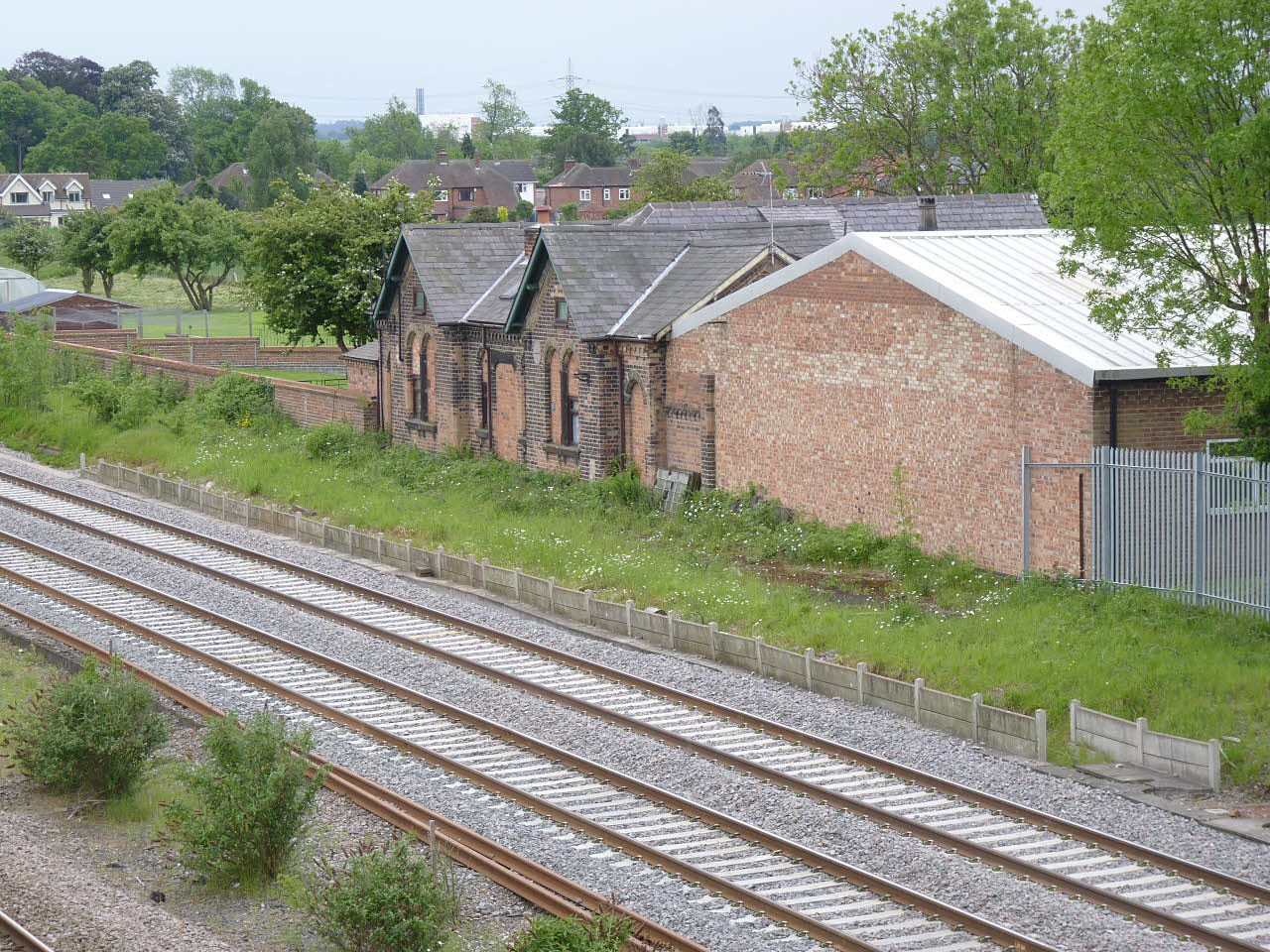
- The remains of Hathern station

General information
- Location: Normanton on Soar, Rushcliffe; England

Other information
- Status: Disused

History
- Original company: Midland Railway
- Pre-grouping: Midland Railway
- Post-grouping: London, Midland and Scottish Railway

Key dates
- 17 February 1868: Station opened
- 1 January 1960: Closed
Location

Hathern railway station was a station serving the village of Hathern in Leicestershire, England.

== History ==
It was built by the Midland Railway on the line originally opened in 1839 by the Midland Counties Railway. This line is now part of the Midland Main Line between Loughborough and Long Eaton

The station opened on 17 February 1868 with a service of four trains in each direction each day

It lay a mile and a half from the village, nearer to those of Sutton Bonington and Normanton-on-Soar in the neighbouring county of Nottinghamshire and closed in 1960.

The station buildings remain, extended, and in use as The Old Hathern Station Bed and Breakfast.

== Accidents ==
On 25 November 1870, Robert Smith aged 25 was crossing the line near Hathern when he was struck by the express train from Leicester.

On 16 October 1871 the mail train from Leeds to London St Pancras left Trent railway station at 5.45am and was at full speed nearing Loughborough when midway between Hathern and Loughborough, five or six coaches derailed injuring 7 people.

On 14 November 1884, William Letts, a porter aged 20 employed at Hathern station was killed by an express train at the station.

== Station masters ==
- Mr. Fewkes ca. 1869
- James Beebe 1870 - 1873 (afterwards station master at Pye Bridge)
- J. Collins 1873 - 1877
- W. Woodard 1877 - 1886
- Thomas Pitt 1886 - 1889
- F. Porter 1890 - 1892
- Samuel Eaton 1892 - 1903
- Ernest Clowes 1903 - 1922 (formerly station master at East Langton)
- F. Judson 1922 - ???? (formerly station master at Kirby Muxloe)

Preceding station	Historical railways	Following station
Loughborough; Line and station open	Midland Railway; Midland Main Line	Kegworth; Line open, station closed
