= St Anne's Church, Sutton Bonington =

St. Anne's Church
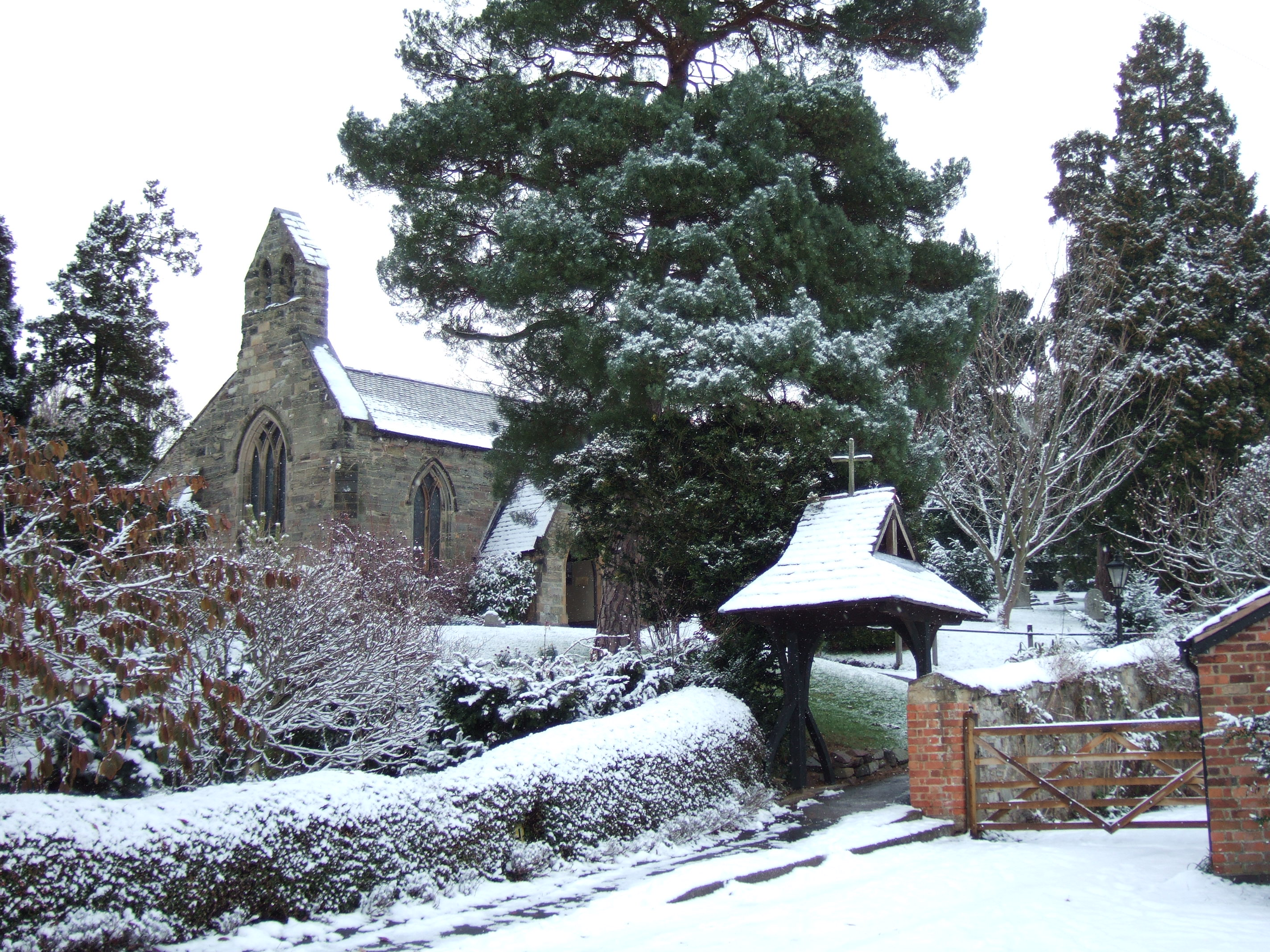
- The church seen from the end of St. Anne's Lane

- Location within Nottinghamshire
- 52.8205°N 1.2507°W
- Location: St Anne's Lane, Sutton
- Denomination: Church of England

History
- Status: parish church (United with St. Michael's)
- Dedication: St. Anne

Architecture
- Functional status: active
- Heritage designation: Grade II*; Listed building
- Designated: 13 Oct 1966

Administration
- Province: York
- Diocese: Southwell and Nottingham
- Parish: Sutton Bonington (pre-1923: Sutton)

St. Anne's Church is a parish church in the Church of England in Sutton Bonington, Nottinghamshire.

The church is a 12th-century Grade II* Listed building.

It is located off the Main Street, at the top end of St Anne's Lane, and near to the Midland Main Line which was constructed past the village in 1840. Sutton Bonington's village hall and library is situated on the lane opposite.

== History ==
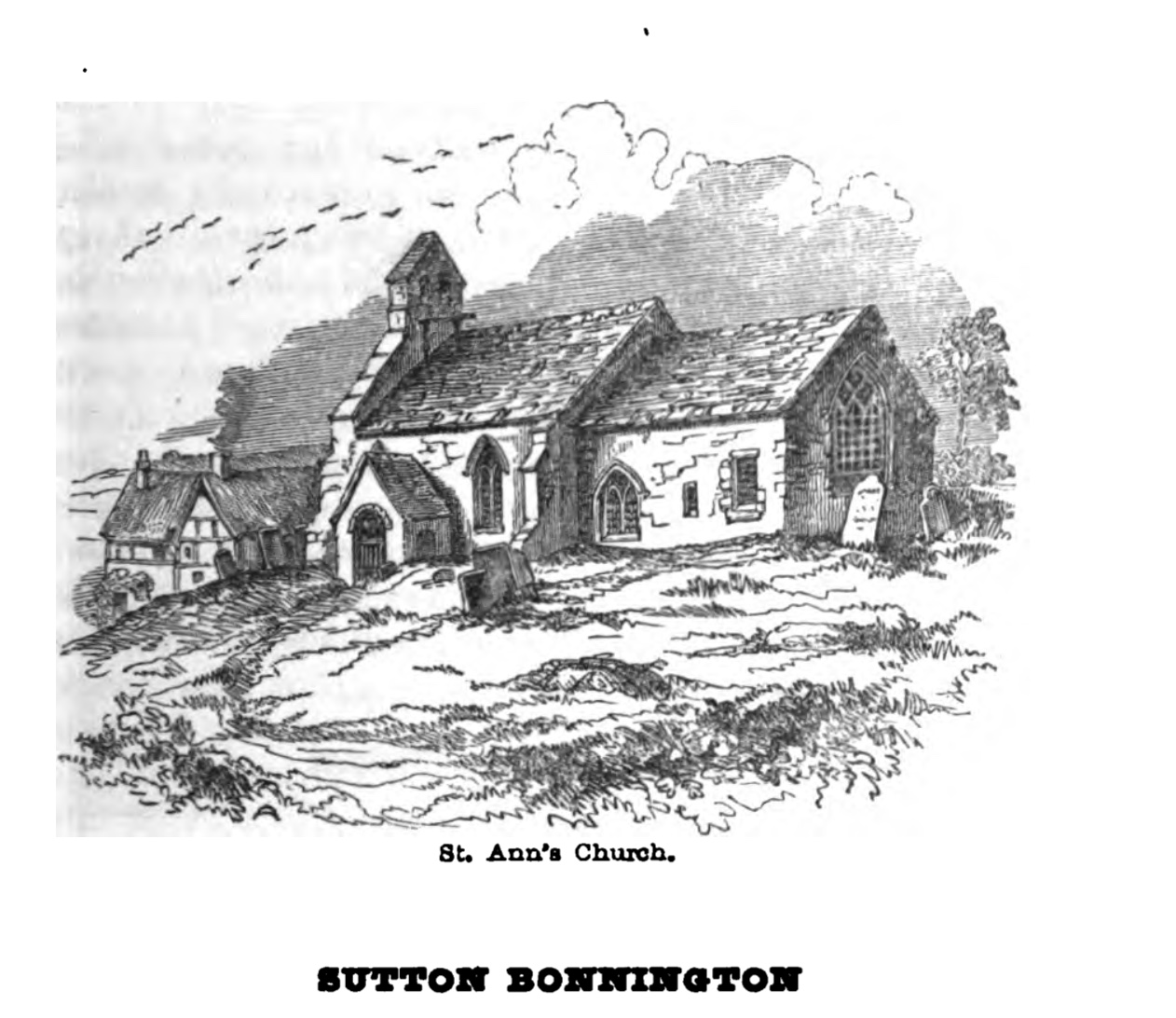
The church shown in the Midland Counties Railway Companion of 1840

Sutton Bonington has two medieval churches, a result of the merging of the two original villages (Sutton and Bonington); they are St. Michael's Church (Bonington's church, located on Main Street) and the smaller St. Anne's Church (Sutton's church).

The two ancient ecclesiastical parishes of Sutton and Bonington were united for civil purposes in 1829 and combined in 1923 into one ecclesiastical parish (with one rector appointed from 1950). St. Anne's Rectory is now a private house and recently new housing has been built in the former rectory gardens, adjacent to the rear of the church. Related to the situation of the two original parishes, Sutton and Bonington are separate manors, named after their churches — St. Anne and St. Michael respectively.

A notable feature inside is a 15th-century alabaster effigy of a knight set in a recess.

=== Present day ===
Regular services continue to be held in both churches. The current priest in charge (for both churches in Sutton Bonington) is Glenn Martin, who is also the priest in charge of the neighbouring parish of Normanton on Soar (with its Grade I Church of St. James).

== Bells ==
The church has a west-facing, 19th century, gable end bellcote, consisting of two arches each with a bell.

== See also ==
- Grade II* listed buildings in Nottinghamshire
- Listed buildings in Sutton Bonington
