= Marjorie Bates =

English painter

Marjorie Christine Bates
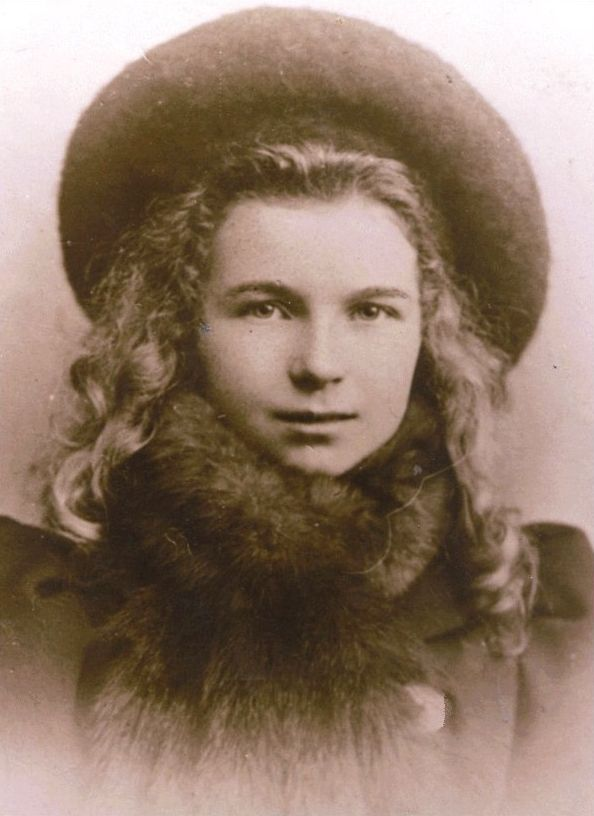
- Born: 1886; Kings Newton, United Kingdom
- Died: 1962 (aged 75–76)
- Known for: Painting

Marjorie Christine Bates (19 May 1886 –20 December 1962) was an English landscape painter who exhibited at the Royal Academy in London and in Paris. She achieved a moderate living from her paintings.

== Biography ==
Born in Kings Newton, near Melbourne, Derbyshire, Bates was the daughter of George Bates and his wife Emily Pentecost. Her father was a lace merchant who made money from the sale of mosquito netting. Her family moved to Wilford in Nottinghamshire, where in 1911 they were living in a house called the Grange. Bates attended the Nottingham School of Art and exhibited at the Royal Academy between 1910 and 1934. She was a distant relative of both Laura Knight and Harold Gresley.

She received commission from the Sultan of Zanzibar which enabled her to travel in Africa until the start of the First World War. She was in Malta working with the British Red Cross when the wounded arrived from Gallipoli. She was engaged to be married but her fiance died in that war. After the war she was based in Nottingham's Lace market where she made a living from her art. Using watercolours and pastels she created landscapes for postcards and illustrations for books. In 1953 she created a series of landscapes to mark the coronation and one of images was given to the Queen Mother.

Bates died on 20 December 1962 in Costessey, Norfolk, aged 76, still living at the Grange in Wilford. She left an estate valued at £6,836.
