= John Joseph Briggs =

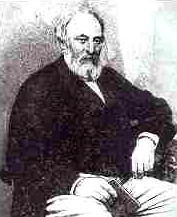
- Born: 6 March 1819; Kings Newton near Melbourne, Derbyshire
- Died: 23 March 1876 (aged 57); Kings Newton
- Education: Mr. Thomas Rossell Potter's school
- Occupation(s): Farmer, poet, naturalist and topographer
- Spouse: Hannah Soar
- Children: a son and three daughters
- Parent(s): John and Mary

John Joseph Briggs (6 March 1819 – 23 March 1876), naturalist and topographer, was born in the village of Kings Newton (or King's Newton), Derbyshire on 6 March 1819. His father, John Briggs, who married his cousin, Mary Briggs, was born and resided for 88 years on the same farm, at Kings Newton, which had been the freehold of his ancestors for three centuries.

== Education ==
In 1828, John went to the boarding school of Thomas Rossell Potter, the historian of Charnwood Forest at Wymeswold in Leicestershire, and in 1833 to the Rev. Solomon Saxon, of Darley Dale. He was apprenticed to Mr. Bemrose, the head of the printing firm of William Bemrose & Sons, Derby, but ill-health compelled him to give up his indoor occupation, and continue his ancestors' occupation of farming at Elms Farm in Kings Newton.

== Chronicler ==
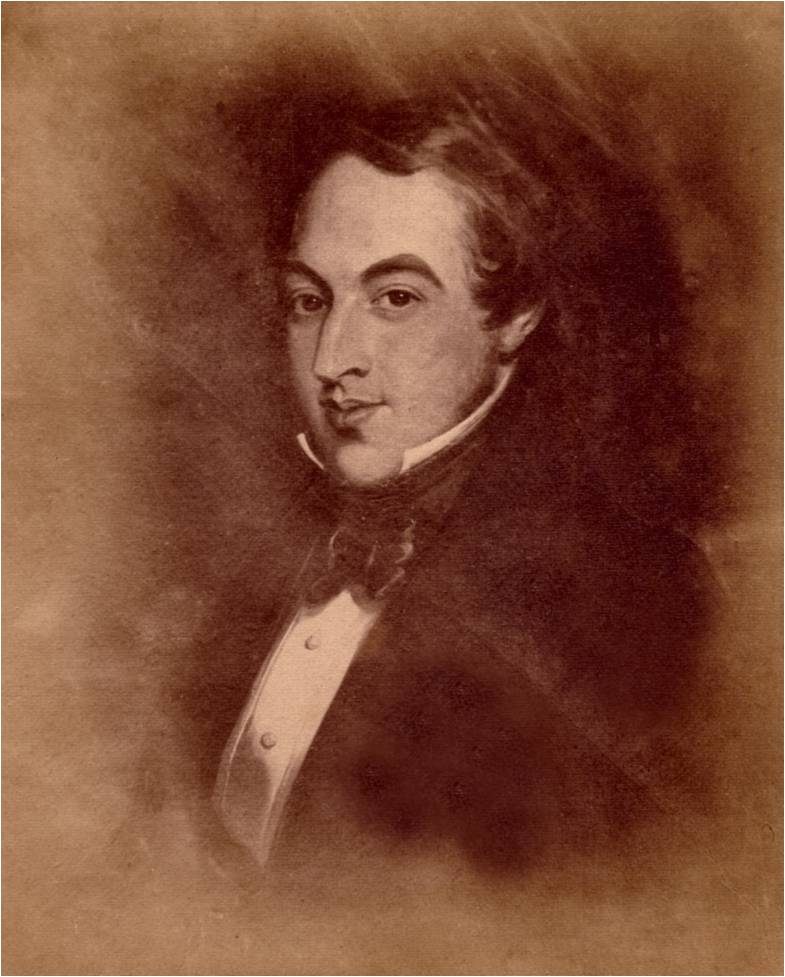
John Joseph Briggs as a young man, artist unknown

He became the faithful chronicler of the seasons, and recorded all the facts and occurrences coming within his observation during at least thirty years. He kept these notes carefully bound in manuscript volumes, and shortly before his death they were announced as ready for publication.

He utilised his notes regularly in the magazine The Field, in which as early as 1855 he had originated "The Naturalists" column,' and entered into correspondence with the leading naturalists of the time. In 1863 he was in correspondence with Charles Darwin concerning the regrowth of fishes' fins. His notes in the Zoologist, Critic, Reliquary, Sun, Derby Reporter, and Leicestershire Guardian (edited by his old schoolmaster, Mr. Potter), were full of picturesque descriptions of nature and sketches of places and objects in the Midland counties of archaeological and antiquarian interest. His History of Melbourne included references to Robin Hood, John Wesley's early journeys and how the Duke of Bourbon was imprisoned in the reigns of Henry V and Henry VI.

== Memberships ==
He became a fellow of the Royal Society of Literature, and a member of the British Archaeological Association.

== Family ==
In 1869 he married Hannah Soar of Chellaston. Shortly before his death he had retired upon an ample competency, but his health failed, and he died at the place of his birth on 23 March 1876, leaving a widow, a son, and three daughters.

== Major works ==
1. Melbourne, a Sketch of its History and Antiquity, 1839
2. History of Melbourne, including Biographical Notices, with plates and woodcuts, Derby, 1852
3. The Trent and other Poems, Derby, 1857, (with additions, Derby, 1859)
4. The Peacock at Rowsley,' London, 1869, 8vo, a gossiping book about fishing and country life with a descriptive of a well-known resort of anglers at the junction of the Wye and River Derwent.
5. Guide to Melbourne and King's Newton, Derby, 1870.
6. History and Antiquities of Hemington, Leicestershire, twelve copies, privately printed, with coloured lithographs and woodcuts, London, 1873.

Besides these works and the unpublished observations on natural history, Briggs had been for many years collecting materials for a book to be entitled The Worthies of Derbyshire, for which we believe he had notes for at least 700 memoirs. This work was not published in his lifetime.
