= Kings Newton =

Village in Derbyshire, England

Coordinates: 52.832°N 1.423°W

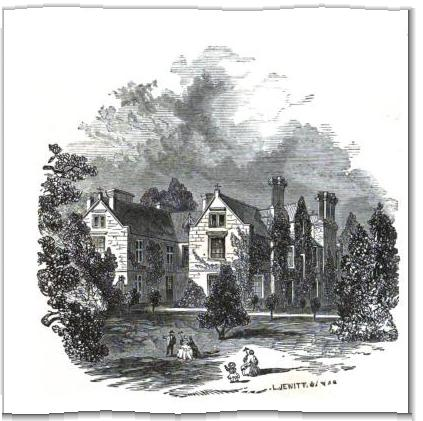
The Hall at Kings Newton in 1859

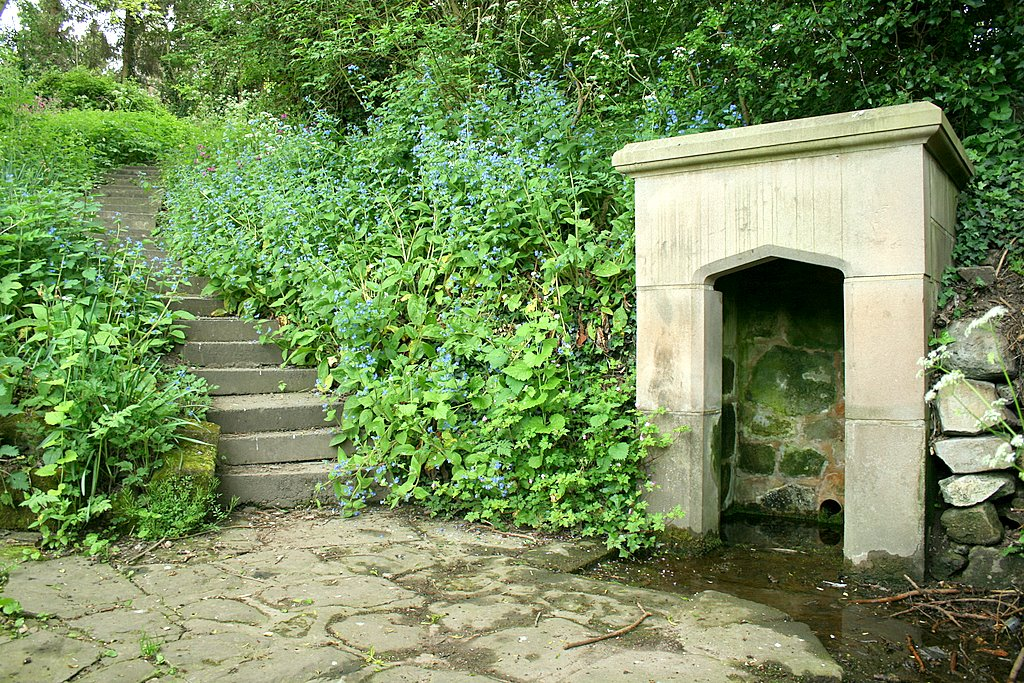
Holy Well in Kings Newton

Kings Newton is a village in South Derbyshire. The population of the village is included in Melbourne. The Holy well (pictured) was constructed around 1660, but has been refurbished at the end of the twentieth century.

== History ==
Unlike many villages in Derbyshire, Kings Newton is not mentioned in the Domesday Book and is a "new town". Originally the hamlet was called Newton but the prefix of Kings was added to differentiate it from other Newtons in the surrounding counties.

After the successful campaign at the Battle of Sobraon, Henry Hardinge was created Viscount Hardinge of Lahore and of King's Newton in Derbyshire, with a pension of £3000 for three lives. Why this small village was chosen for his honour is unclear.

The hall illustrated was built in 1560 and was extensively damaged by fire in 1859. It was fully restored in 1910 by Cecil Paget and his first wife. The illustration is from a book of poetry by local naturalist, John Joseph Briggs, whose poem about the Trent was the title of his poetry book.

== Notable residents ==
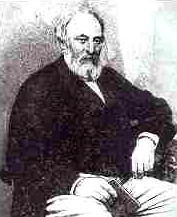
John Joseph Briggs, before 1876

- George Lewis Coke (1715–1751) of Melbourne Hall, Melbourne, Derbyshire, an English gentleman and landowner.
- William Speechly (1735–1819), horticulturist and head gardener to William Cavendish-Bentinck, 3rd Duke of Portland, grew pineapples and grapes; retired to King's Newton Hall, near Melbourne, Derbyshire
- John Joseph Briggs (1819–1876), naturalist and topographer, published a History of Melbourne, Derbyshire.
- Sir Cecil Walter Paget (1874–1936), locomotive engineer and railway administrator, lived in Kings Newton Hall 1910-1936.
- Marjorie Bates (1886–1962), landscape painter who exhibited at the Royal Academy of Arts in London and in Paris.

== See also ==
- Listed buildings in Melbourne, Derbyshire
