= Wynne baronets =

Extinct baronetcy

- Escutcheon of the Wynne baronets of Lees Wood
- Creation date: 1731
- Status: extinct
- Extinction date: by 1793
- Arms: azure, a chevron between three dolphins hauriant argent.

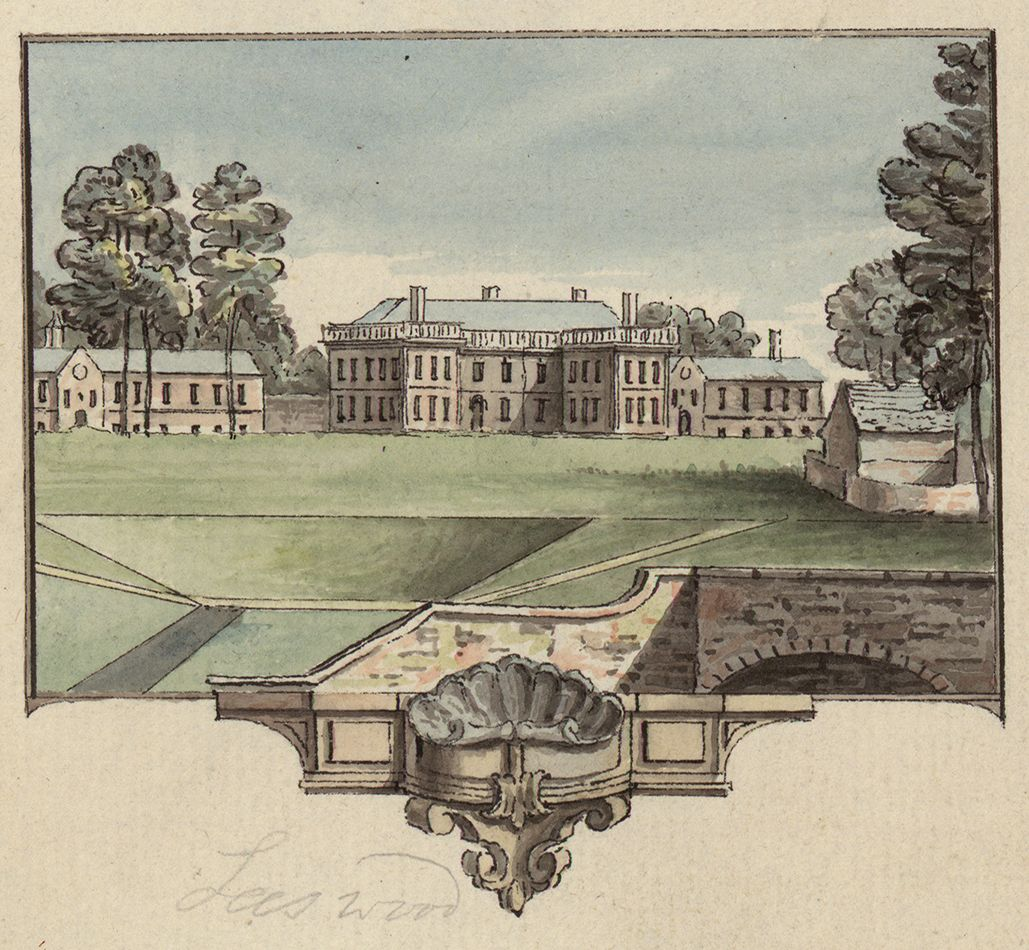
Miniature of Leeswood Hall, home of the Wynne family

The Wynne baronetcy, of Leeswood Hall, Leeswood in the County of Flint, was a title in the Baronetage of Great Britain. It was created on 9 August 1731 for George Wynne, subsequently Member of Parliament for Flint Boroughs from 1734 to 1742. He owned an estate at Halkyn with lead deposits, and was a supporter of Robert Walpole. The title became extinct on the death of the 3rd Baronet some time between 1764 and 1792.

== Wynne baronets, of Lees Wood (1731) ==
- Sir George Wynne, 1st Baronet (1700–1756)
- Sir John Wynne, 2nd Baronet (1702–1764)
- Sir John Wynne, 3rd Baronet (died before 1793)

== See also ==
- Wynn baronets of Gwydir and Bodvean
- Winn baronets of Nostell Priory

Baronetage of Great Britain
| Preceded by Lade baronets | Wynne baronets of Lees Wood; 9 August 1731 | Succeeded by Clayton baronets |
