= Davies brothers of Bersham =

Welsh smithing family

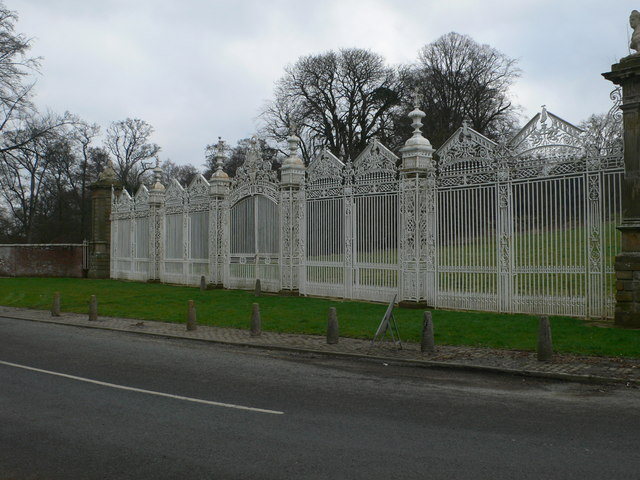
The "White Gates" at Leeswood Hall, attributed to Robert and John Davies

The Davies brothers of Bersham, near Wrexham in north Wales, were a family of smiths active in the 18th century. They were particularly known for their high-quality work in wrought iron, of which several examples still survive in country homes and churchyards around the England-Wales border.

== Biography ==
The family consisted of Hugh or Huw Davies (d. 1702) and his sons Robert (1675–1748) and John (1682–1755), who would both go on to be highly regarded smiths; there were also another two sons, Huw and Thomas, and six daughters, Anne, Magdalen, Jane, Sarah, Elinor, and Margaret. They worked at the Croes Foel forge in Bersham, near Wrexham.

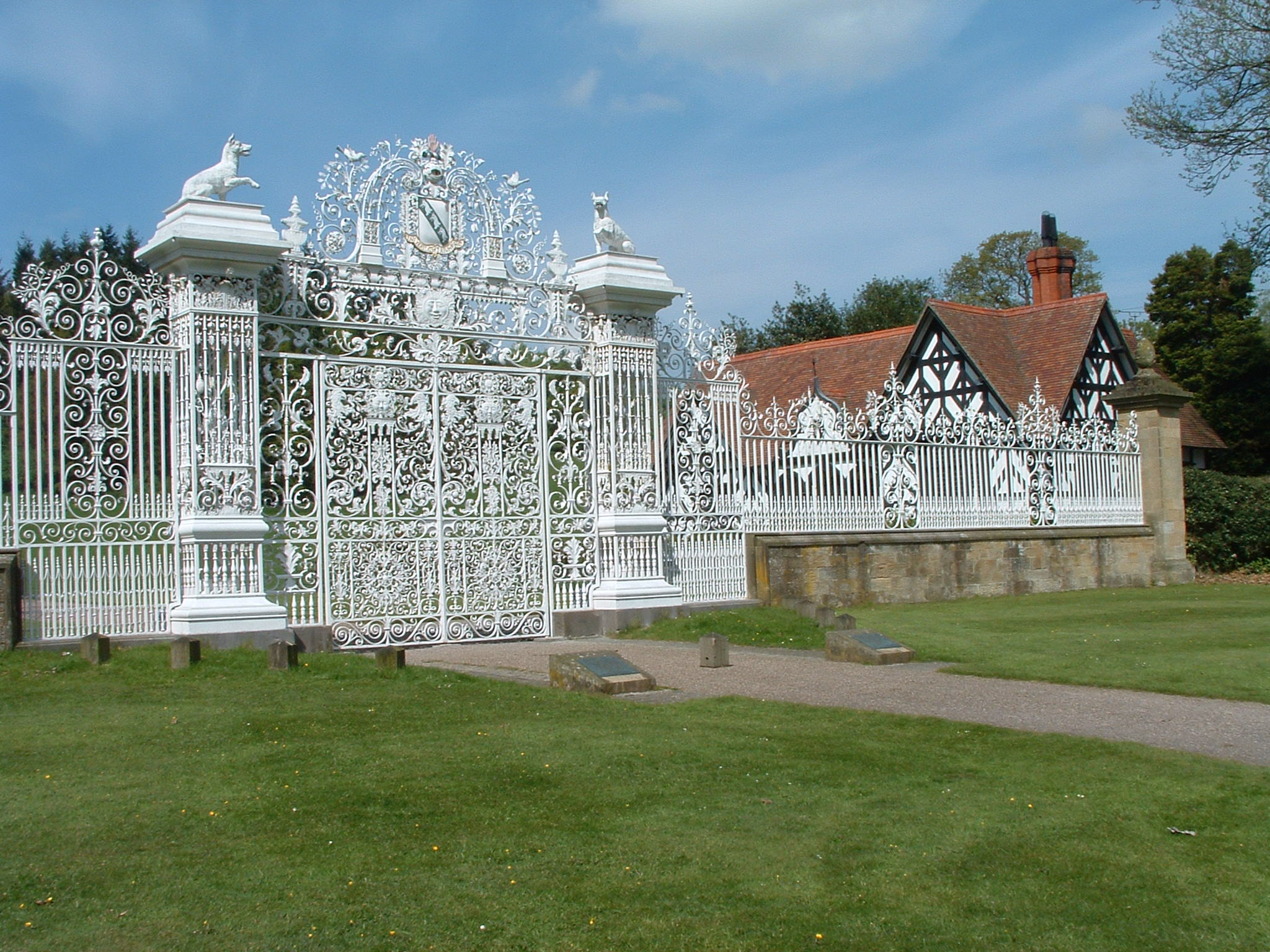
Chirk Castle gates, 1719

Robert – generally considered the most talented of the family – may have studied under the great French wrought iron smith Jean Tijou. The brothers were also have said to have worked with Robert Bakewell of Derby.

The will of Hugh Sr., dated 13 June 1702 and proved at St Asaph in 1703, left a messuage in Bersham to his wife Eleanor and then to his son Robert along with £7 10s., "for which he is to instruct my son Thomas in the trade and science of a smith which he the said Robert now professeth".

Several examples of work known to be by Robert and John survive, as well as a handful of items attributed to their father. Some of these are of exceptionally high quality; a screen and gates known as the "White Gates", at Leeswood Hall, Flintshire, has been described as one of the finest of its type in the United Kingdom, and has been attributed to the Davies brothers on the basis of distinctive fretwork patterns shared with other of their designs. Nikolaus Pevsner described the Davies brothers' work as "miraculous".

== Works by the Davies family ==
The following are linked to the Davies brothers by documentary evidence:

- Gates at Chirk Castle (1719)
- St Giles' Church, Wrexham, gates (1720) by Robert Davies, and chancel gates and choir rail attributed to Hugh Davies (late seventeenth century)
- Gates of St Peter's Church, Ruthin (1727)
- Gate of Oswestry Parish Church (1738)
- Gates of Berwick House, near Shrewsbury (in place by 1760) by Robert Davies, now at Newnham Paddox, Monks Kirby, Warwickshire

== Works attributed to Davies family ==
- Gates formerly at Stansty Park, now at Erddig Hall. Robert Davies is known to have made gates for Erddig, but they were removed during a subsequent remodelling of the park by William Emes.
- The White Gates and Black Gates, Leeswood Hall
- The Golden Gates, Eaton Hall, Cheshire
- Gates of St Mary's Church, Eccleston, from now-demolished Emral Hall near Wrexham
- Gates at Gwysaney Hall, near Sychdyn
- Gates now at Cholmondeley Castle
- Gates of Hawkstone Hall, Shropshire
- Gates and railings at the now-demolished Carden Hall; the gates have now been removed
- The main gates of St Oswald's Church, Malpas were formerly attributed to the brothers, but are now considered to be of a later date. A smaller gate in the churchyard is however thought to be the work of their father Hugh.

== Gallery ==
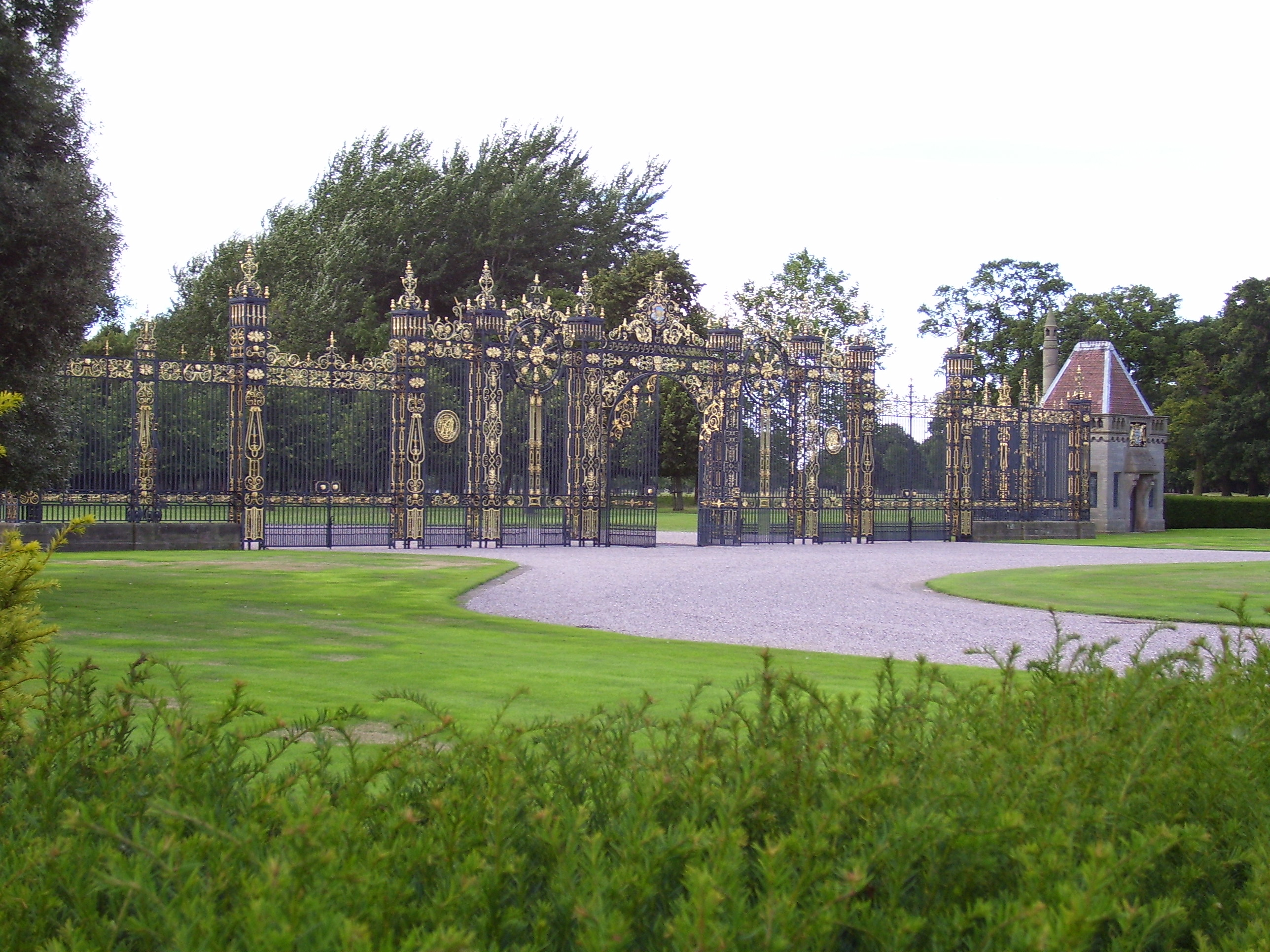
The "Golden Gates", Eaton Hall

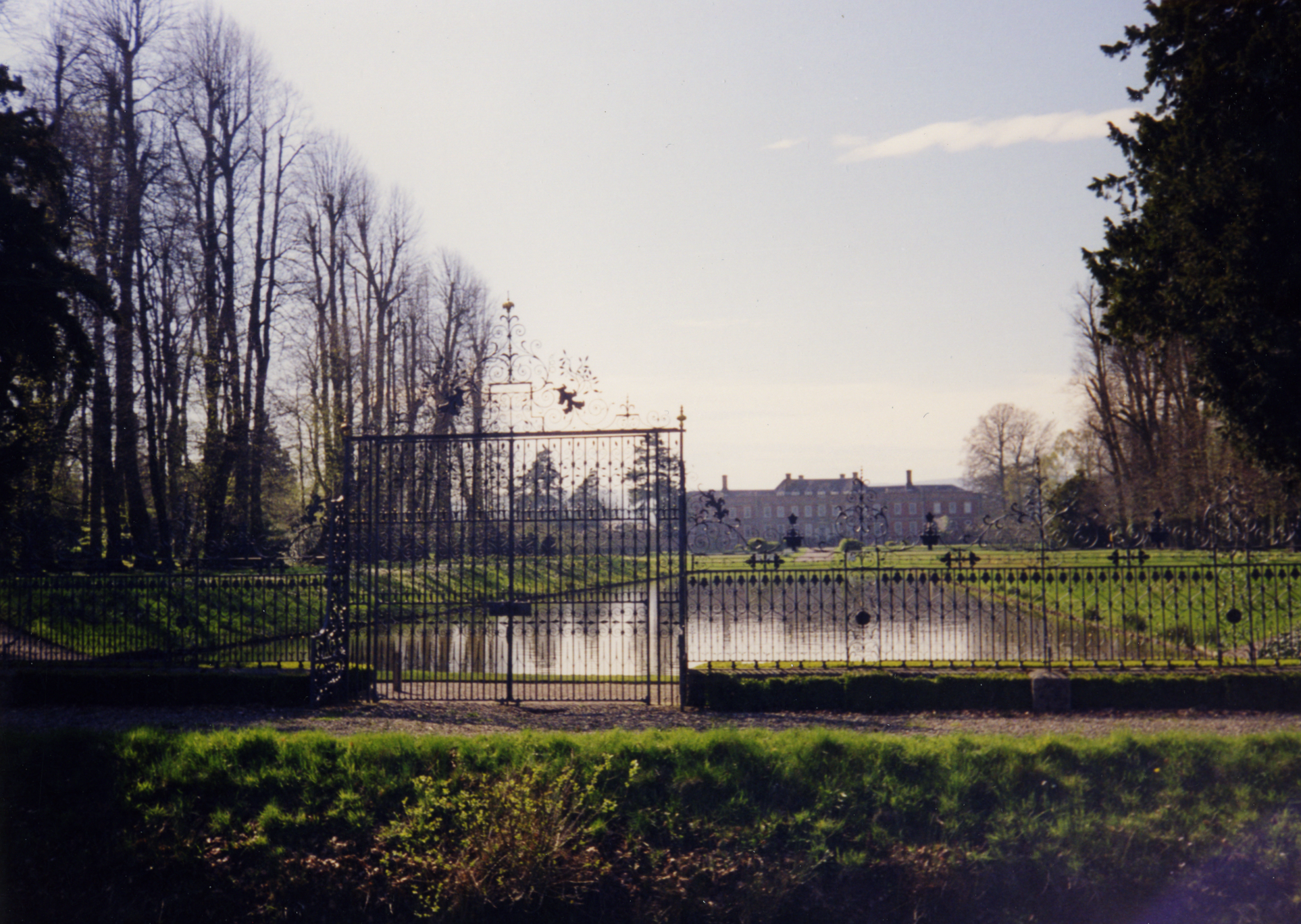
Gates of Erddig, originally at Stansty Park

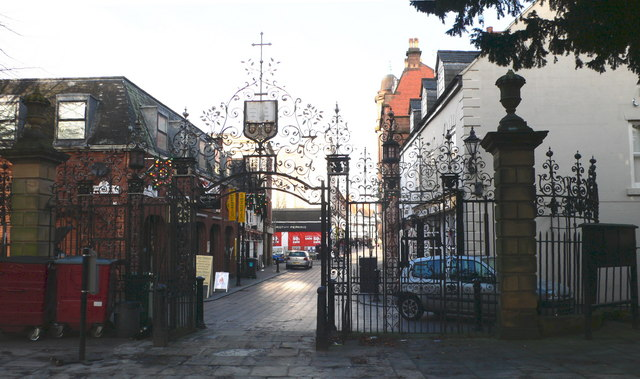
Robert Davies' gates for St Giles, Wrexham

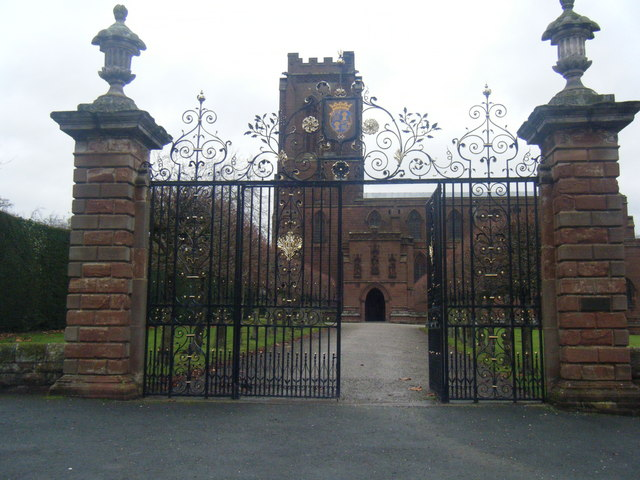
The former gates of Emral Hall, now located at St Mary, Eccleston, Cheshire
