= Stephen Switzer =

English gardener, garden designer and writer

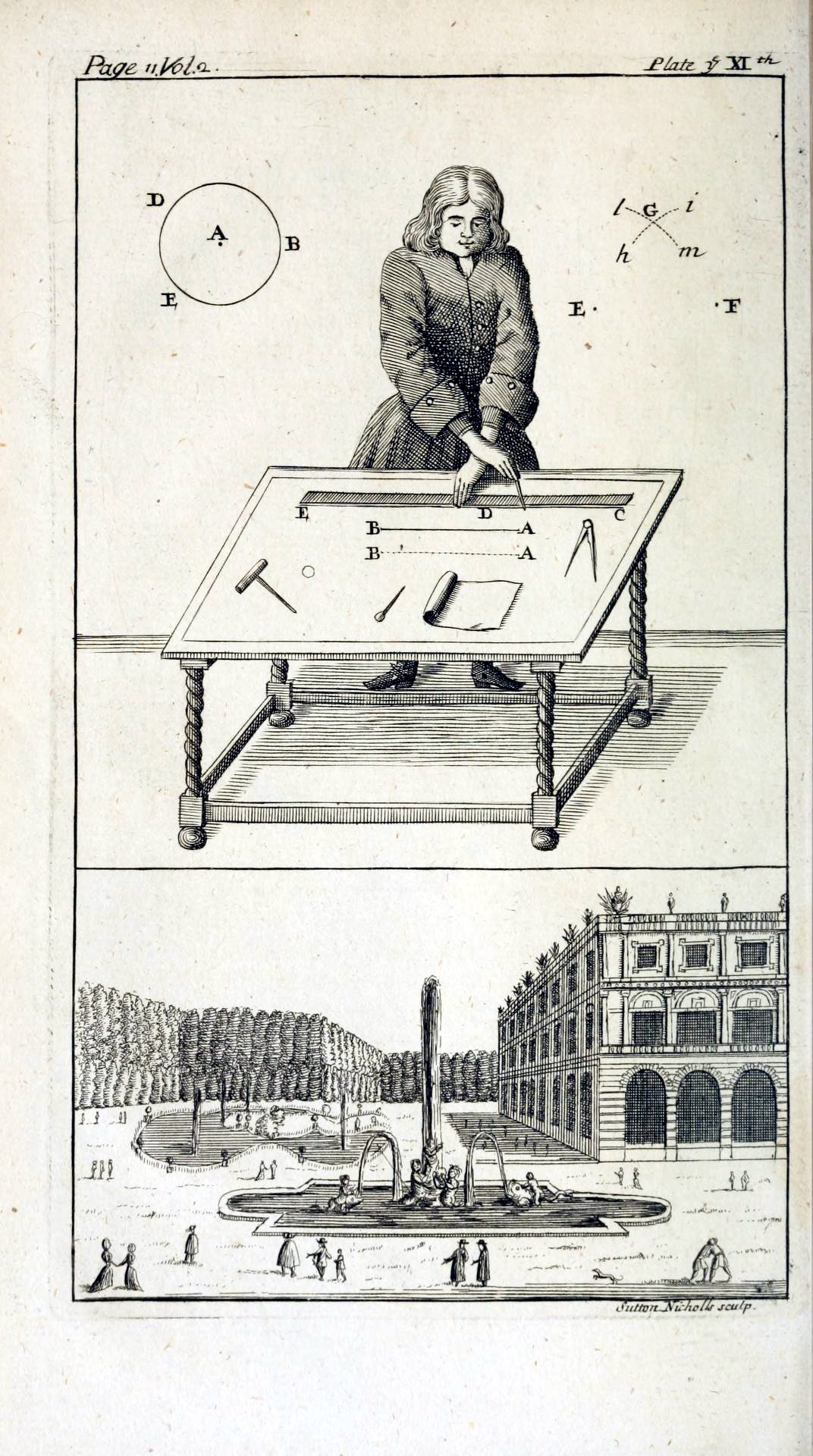
Ichnographica Rustica, Vol 2, plate 11, 1718, probably a portrait.

Stephen Switzer (1682–1745) was an English gardener, garden designer and writer on garden subjects, often credited as an early exponent of the English landscape garden. He is most notable for his views of the transition between the large garden, still very formal in his writings, and the surrounding countryside, especially woodland.

He himself called his intended style the "Natural and Rural way of Gardens", and a modern garden historian has termed it the "English Forest Style", turning sites such as Wray Wood behind Castle Howard into "a network of meandering walks creating a sort of labyrinth woodland". But his main work on the subject, Ichnographica Rustica, or The Nobleman, Gentleman, and Gardener's recreation (1715–18) came rather too early for the flood of new American trees and shrubs that led to the development of the shrubbery a generation later, and subsequently the woodland garden, and Switzer's schemes for the more distant parts of sites from the house seem to have firmly remained woodland rather than garden. Like many later gardening writers, his views are often expressed with more intemperate fervour than clarity.

Although he had never travelled abroad to see them, Switzer admired and emulated the formal grandeur of French broad prospects and woodland avenues, finding in the state of horticulture an index of cultural health, in Augustan Rome as in contemporary Britain, where August Designs [his example is Blenheim Palace], denote that Greatness of Mind that reigns in the English Nobility and Gentry".

His landscape design principles parallel those expressed in Alexander Pope's Epistle to Lord Burlington and the views on "natural" gardening expressed in essays by Joseph Addison, but his rejection of formality was perhaps rather limited by later standards. The contrast between the text and the illustrations in the Ichnographica, which show highly formal gardens with fearsomely high and straight clipped hedges, "has puzzled historians for many years", and perhaps results from a lack of communication with the illustrator, or a loss of nerve.

== Life and work ==
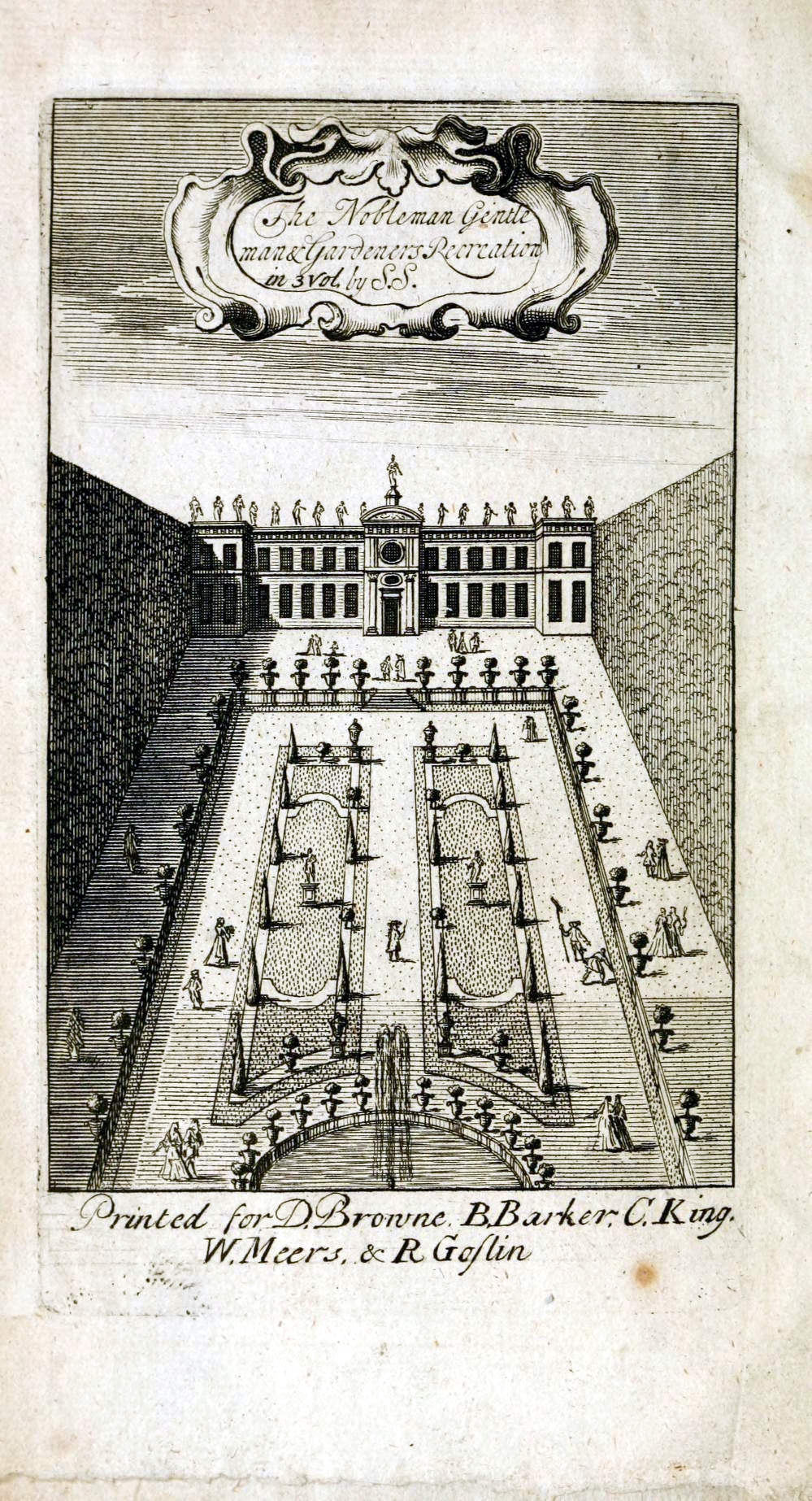
Ichnographica Rustica, or The Nobleman, Gentleman, and Gardener's recreation, title plate, 1715

Switzer received sufficient early training in Hampshire to be taken on as a garden boy working for George London and Henry Wise in their Brompton nursery, in Kensington, now part of London.

Rising through the ranks of the largest nursery and landscaping operation of the day, Switzer helped execute London's designs at Castle Howard, Yorkshire (from 1706), notably the wilderness, at Cirencester Park, Gloucestershire (from about 1713), and at Blenheim Palace, Oxfordshire. Switzer also designed the garden at Grimsthorpe Castle, Lincolnshire (about 1716). He is credited with the landscaping of Leeswood Hall, Flintshire, for Sir George Wynne in the 1720s.

In 1715 Switzer published a work on "Forest, or Rural Gardening", The Nobleman, Gentleman, and Gardener's Recreation, which he expanded to form his Ichnographia (1718; lightly revised and enlarged with two further essays as Ichnographia Rustica 1741–42). He also published The Practical Husbandman and Planter (1733) and An Introduction to a General System of Hydrostaticks and Hydraulicks (1729).

Ichnographia seems targeted "at the owners of villas who sought a small estate near London", recognising that "the Fatigues of Court and Senate often force the illustrious Patriots of their Country to retreat, and breathe the sweet and fragrant Air of gardens", many of which were on gentle hills. He advised that "all the adjacent Country be laid open to view", showing the "extensive charms of Nature, and the voluminous Tracts of a pleasant County", still a realistic hope at that date.

He distinguished between city and country gardens, and saw no point in growing flowers in the latter, as "the nobler Diversions of the Country take place ... [after the end of May] ... when the Beauty of Flowers is gone, and Borders are like Graves, and rather a Blemish than Beauty to our finest gardens". Even in 1715 this was a considerable exaggeration, but not a complete one. He was always concerned with the cost of gardening, and opposed walled gardens, except for some fruit in the kitchen garden, most landscaping, topiary ("monstrous shapes of Screws, Monkeys, Giants etc.") and expensive exotic plants.

Switzer included the first lengthy historical sketch of the progress of gardening in England in The Nobleman, Gentleman, and Gardener's Recreation was vocal in the criticism of topiary and the formality of the "Dutch Garden" and introduced the term ferme ornée, the "ornamental farm" integrating the "useful" and "profitable" aspects of kitchen gardening and animal husbandry with apparently artless beautiful and charming views and details.

His main rival in the practical, though not the literary, aspects of early tentative exercises in "naturalistic" planting schemes was Charles Bridgeman, another gardener trained by London and Wise. Coming from Cambridgeshire, Bridgeman probably escaped Switzer's scorn for "several Northern Lads which ... by the help of a little Learning, and a great deal of Impudence ... invade the Southern provinces and ... pretend to know more in one Twelve-month, than a laborious, honest Southern Countryman does in Seven Years ... ." Capability Brown (1716–1783), from Kirkharle in distant Northumberland, may not have done.

== Selected publications ==
- 1715-18: Ichnographica Rustica, or The Nobleman, Gentleman, and Gardener's recreation. Volume 1; Volume 2; Volume 3.
- 1724: The Practical Fruit Gardener.
- 1727: The Practical Kitchen Gardener.
- 1729: Introduction to Hydrostatics and Hydraulics. Volume 1; Volume 2.
- 1731: Cythisus of the Ancients.
- 1733–1734: The Practical Husband and Planter. or, Observations on the Ancient and Modern Husbandry, Planting and Gardening, Etc. Monthly journal. Volume 1; Volume 2.
- 1734: Universal System of Water and Water Works. 2 Vol.
