= Henry Wise (gardener) =

English gardener

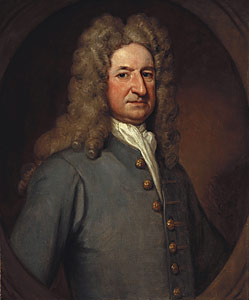
- Born: 4 September 1653
- Died: 1738

Henry Wise (bapt. 4 September 1653 – 15 December 1738) was an English gardener, designer, and nurseryman. He was apprenticed to George London, working at Brompton Nursery, on the present site of the Victoria and Albert Museum, London. The two later worked as partners on parterre gardens at Hampton Court, Chelsea Hospital, Longleat, Chatsworth, Melbourne Hall, Wimpole Hall and Castle Howard, drawing inspiration from engravings of contemporary garden designs in France and the Netherlands.

Wise and London translated into English two well-known French texts on gardening. The resulting work was titled "The Retir'd Gard'ner, in Two Volumes: the Whole Revis'd, with Several Alterations and Additions, Which Render It Proper for Our English Culture." The book was printed in London in 1706 and went through several printings thanks to its popularity.

Kensington Gardens were laid out by Henry Wise and Charles Bridgeman with fashionable features including the Round Pond, formal avenues and a sunken Dutch garden.

Queen Anne and King George I both appointed him to the post of Royal Gardener. Although the Brompton nursery passed into other hands, Wise retained the house, Brompton Park. His will, in 1734, directed his heir to remove all the pictures remaining at Brompton to his house at Warwick.

Wise became wealthy through his gardening endeavours and purchased the manor of The Priory, Warwick. He purchased the estate and the mansion and retired there as a country squire in 1727. Henry Wise died at The Priory on 15 Dec 1738, said to be worth some £200,000 – far more, probably, than some of his clients.

The writer and garden designer Stephen Switzer trained with London and Wise.
