= Leeswood Hall =

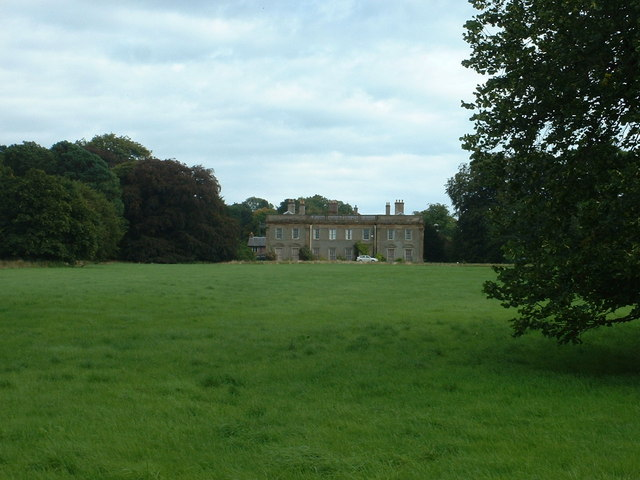
- "a landscape garden of national importance"

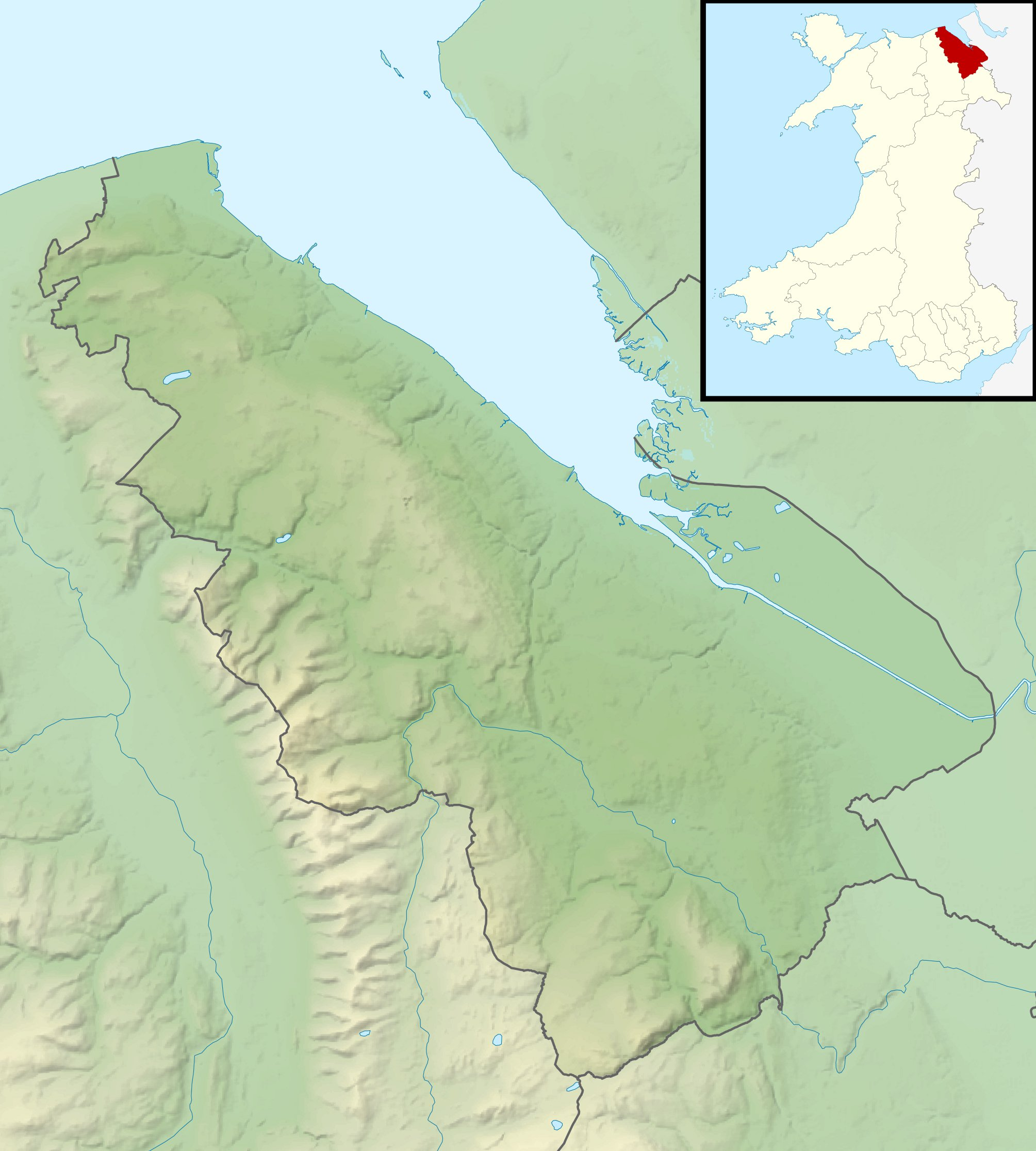
- Location within Flintshire
- 53.1442°N 3.1189°W
- Type: House
- Location: Leeswood, Flintshire

History
- Built: 1724-1726

Site notes
- Architect: Francis Smith of Warwick
- Governing body: Privately owned

Listed Building – Grade II*
- Official name: Leeswood Hall
- Designated: 22 October 1952
- Reference no.: 567

Listed Building – Grade II
- Official name: Walled Garden including Stone Piers, Cottage and Vine House
- Designated: 3 April 1987
- Reference no.: 569

Listed Building – Grade II
- Official name: Former Dovecote
- Designated: 3 April 1987
- Reference no.: 570

Listed Building – Grade I
- Official name: White Gates, Screens and Piers northwest of Leeswood Hall
- Designated: 6 November 1962
- Reference no.: 285

Listed Building – Grade II*
- Official name: Pair of Lodges flanking north driveway to Leeswood Hall
- Designated: 22 October 1952
- Reference no.: 573

Leeswood Hall is a country house in Leeswood, Flintshire, Wales. Dating from 1742, it was built for George Wynne, the design being attributed to Francis Smith. Construction reputedly cost £40,000. The hall is a Grade II* listed building. To the northwest of the hall stand the White Gates, which have their own Grade I listing. The gates terminate the view from the hall across the lawns, an early and rare example of 18th-century parkland design by Stephen Switzer, and a Grade I listed landscape of national significance.

== History ==
George Wynne was born in 1700 into a family of impoverished North Wales gentry. His fortunes were transformed when lead was rediscovered on the Halkyn Mountain estate he had inherited from his mother. (Note: The presence of lead deposits on Halkyn Mountain had been known to the Romans.) After protracted litigation with his father, Wynne secured control of the mine, embarked on a political career, and spent some £40,000 on building a house and estate befitting his new status. His architect for the house was Francis Smith of Warwick and for the park, Stephen Switzer. A supporter of Robert Walpole, he received a baronetcy and served as High Sheriff of Flintshire in 1722–1724. He was later nearly ruined by falling receipts from his mines, and lavish expenditure on his estate, spending some time incarcerated as a debtor in the King's Bench Prison. He died in poverty in 1756.

In the late 18th century, the house was in the possession of the Reverend Hope Eyton, whose descendants were still resident in the early 1980s. Rev. Eyton remodelled the hall, considerably reducing its scale by the demolition of two large wings. Most of the interior decoration dates from this time.

== Architecture and description ==
The current house is of eight bays, and two storeys, the third having been removed in the alterations undertaken by Rev. Eyton. The main construction material is red brick, faced with cement render. The interior contains some 18th-century plasterwork and fireplaces, but most of the decoration, including an imperial staircase dates from the Regency era.

== Parkland and pleasure grounds ==
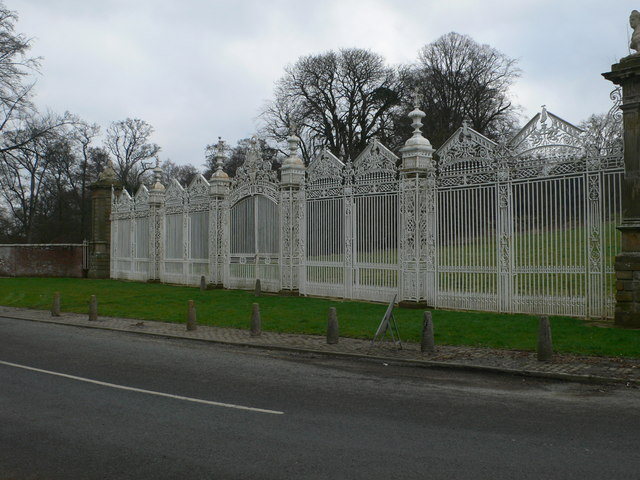
The White Gates

The park at Leeswood Hall is of "national importance" as an early 18th-century landscape designed by Stephen Switzer. It is designated Grade I on the Cadw/ICOMOS Register of Parks and Gardens of Special Historic Interest in Wales. The grounds lie mainly to the north of the hall and terminate in the White Gates, which have been attributed both to Robert Davies and to Robert Bakewell. (Note: The gates have traditionally been attributed to Robert Davies, or as a joint work by Robert and his brother John on the basis of their similarity to the gates at Chirk Castle, some 17 miles to the south. More recent studies suggest Robert Bakewell as an alternative.) The gates are listed Grade I. The gates were originally flanked by two lodges or pavilions but these were moved to either side of the Black Gates on the Mold road after 1809. The Black Gates in situ as at 2020 are not original, these having been re-sited to a building called The Tower on the outskirts of Mold. The lodges have their own Grade II* listing.

To the west of the hall is a large mound, known as The Mount. By local tradition, this is the motte of a motte-and-bailey castle. There is no archaeological or documentary evidence for this claim, and it is possible that it was created by Switzer as a garden feature. It has two canopied stone chairs, from an original set of four, and a stone table at its summit. The park contains many other historic structures, in varying states of preservation. The ice house, stables, dovecote and walled garden all have their own Grade II listings.

== Sources ==
- Hubbard, Edward (2003) [1986]. Clwyd. Buildings of Wales. New Haven, US and London: Yale University Press. ISBN 978-0-300-09627-9. OCLC 49298798.
- Jenkins, Philip (2014). A History of Modern Wales: 1536-1990. Abingdon-on-Thames, Oxfordshire: Routledge. ISBN 978-1-317-87268-9.
