= Gwysaney Hall =

Building in Halkyn, Wales

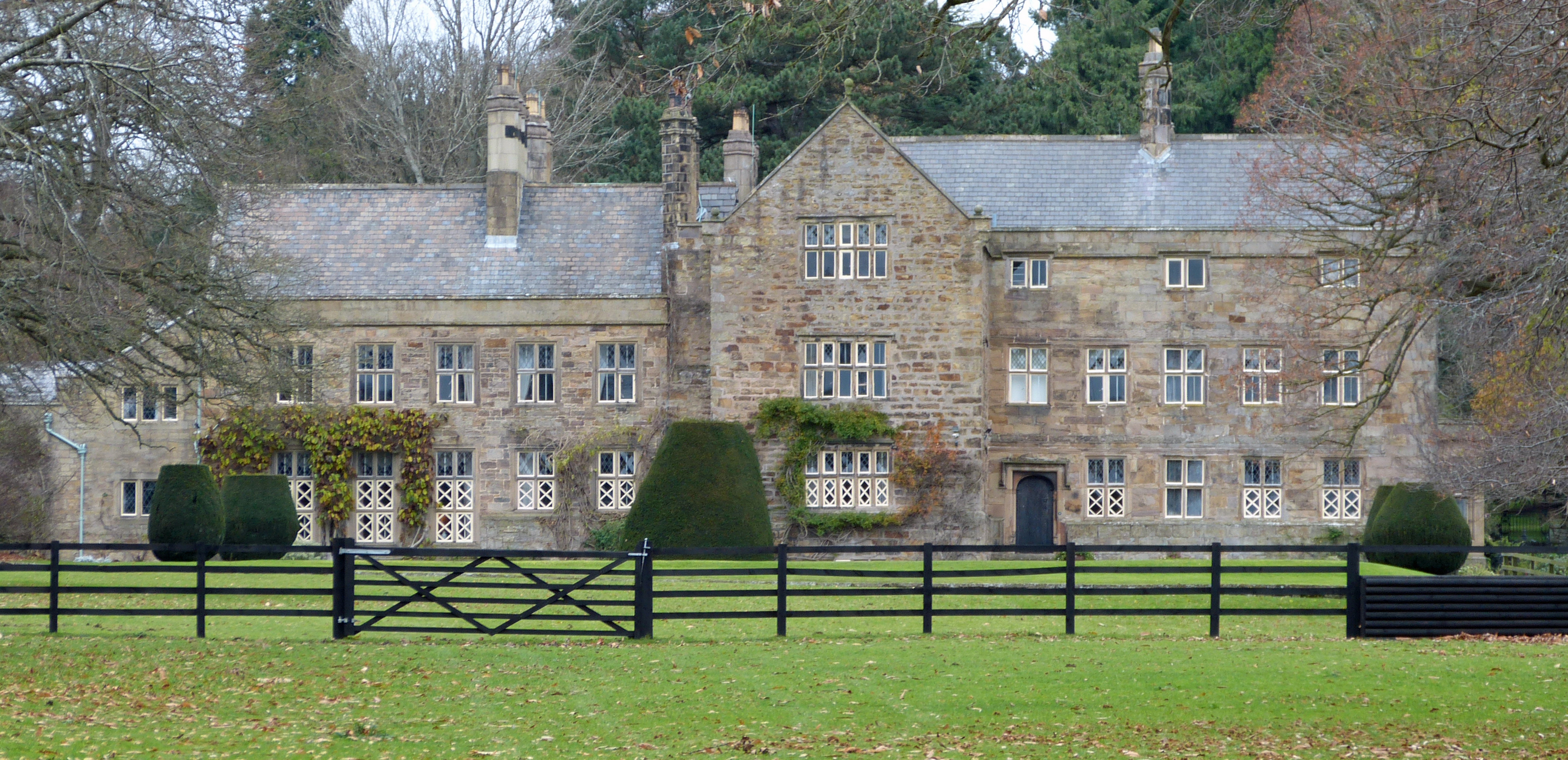

Gwysaney Hall is Jacobean house built in 1603 in the community of Halkyn, near Mold, in Flintshire, Wales. In 1952, the Welsh government service Cadw designated the property a Grade II* listed building as a "substantial and well-preserved" example of Jacobean architecture.
