= Sir George Wynne, 1st Baronet =

Welsh land owner and Whig politician

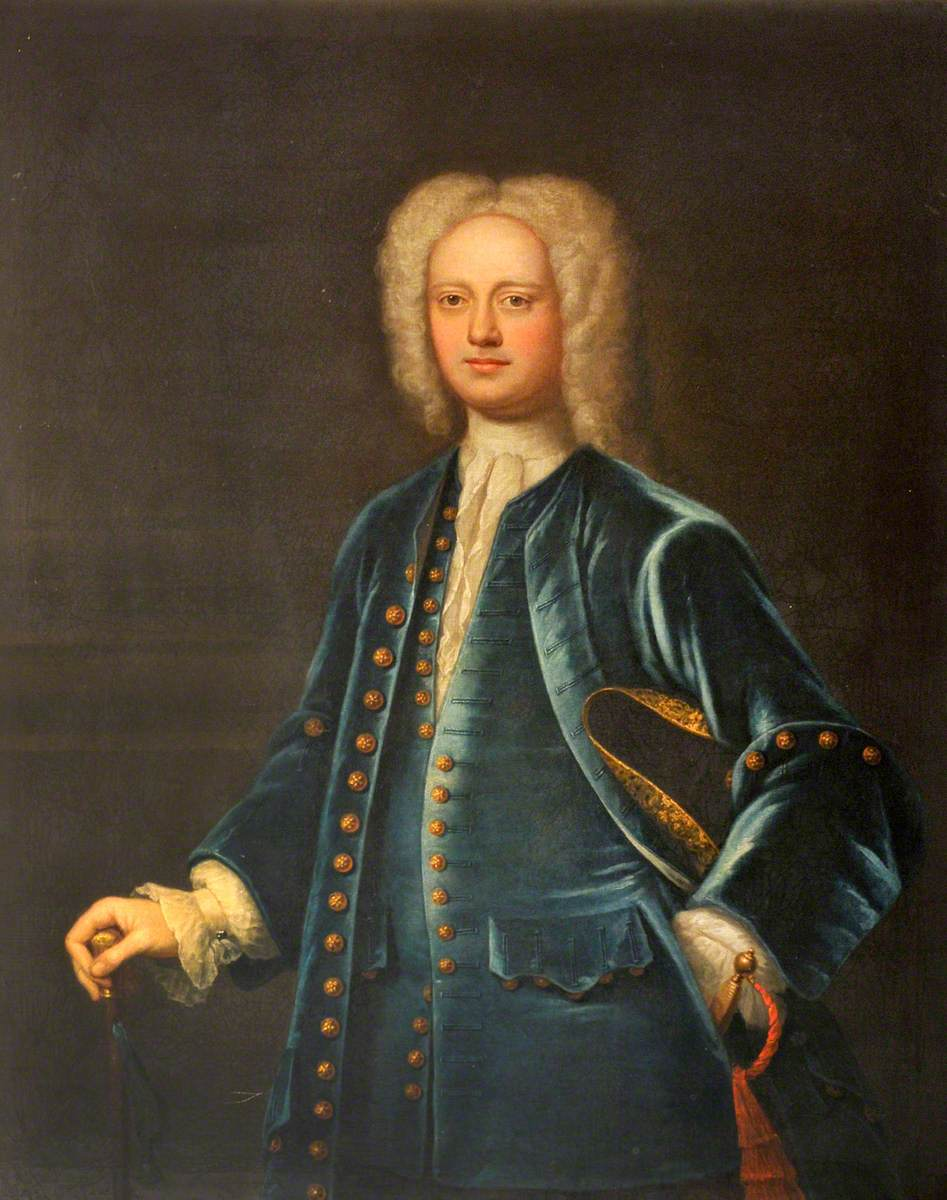
Sir George Wynne, portrait around 1736

Sir George Wynne, 1st Baronet (May 1700 – 5 August 1756), of Leeswood Hall, Flintshire, was a Welsh land owner and Whig politician who sat in the House of Commons from 1734 to 1742.

== Early life ==
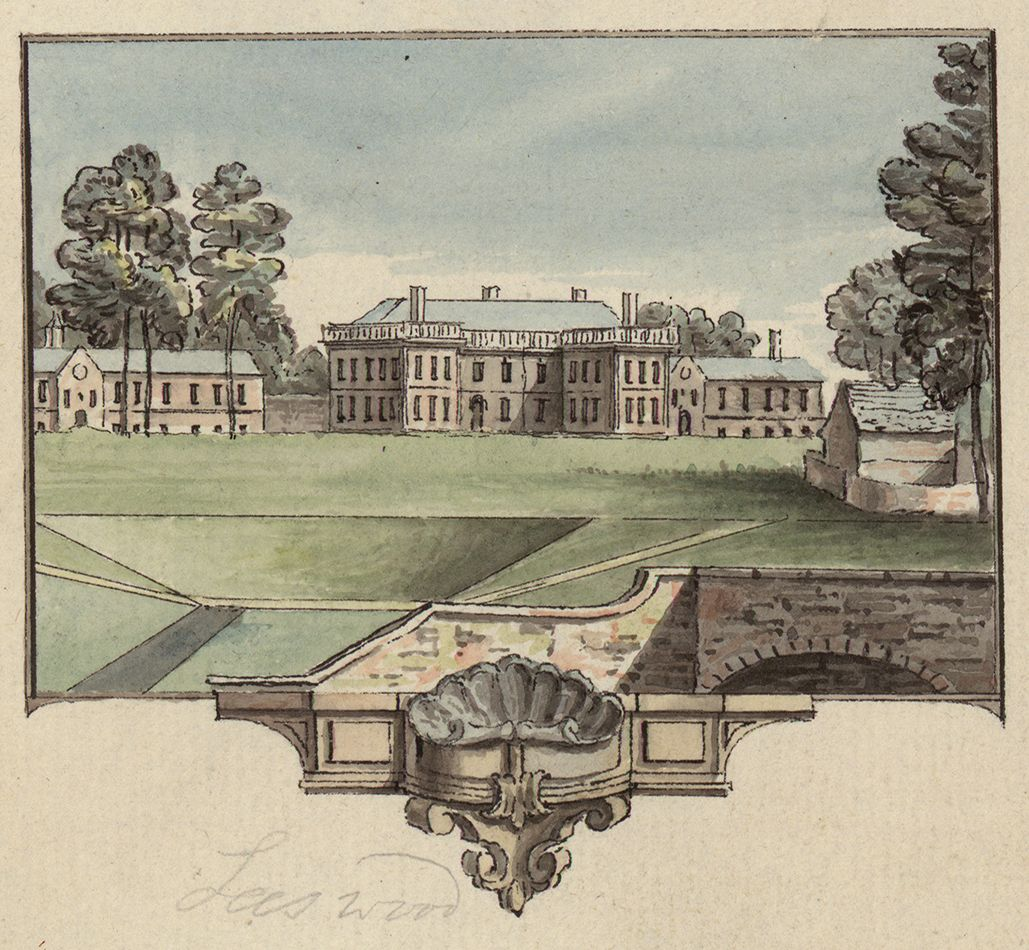
Miniature of Leeswood Hall, home of the Wynne family

Wynne was the eldest son of John Wynne of Leeswood and his first wife Jane Jones, daughter of Humphrey Jones of Halkyn, Flintshire. His mother died in 1703 and his father, who was a poor Welsh country gentleman, remarried Catherine Jones, one of the servants. Wynne succeeded to the Halkyn estate of his mother which then brought about £30 a year. He married Margaret Lloyd, daughter of Evan Lloyd of Tyddyn, Flintshire, on 26 April 1720 against the objection of his father that she had neither fortune nor quality equal to his son. Valuable lead deposits were discovered on the Halkyn estate and after prolonged litigation with his father, Wynne secured control of the estate. His father published a pamphlet in about 1731 entitled “The sufferings of John Wynne of Leeswood, Esq’ accusing his son and father in law of defrauding him of the £22,000 a year yield of the mine. Wynne re-built and re-equipped the family house at Leeswood with no regard to the expense. He was High Sheriff of Flintshire from 1722 to 1724.

== Career ==
At the 1727 British general election Wynne stood for Flint Boroughs, when there was a double return and the seat was awarded to his opponent. He attached himself to Walpole and campaigned against the strong Tory powerbase in Wales, and was rewarded with a baronetcy on 16 July 1731. At the 1734 British general election he was returned as Member of Parliament for Flint Boroughs in an extremely expensive contest. In Parliament, he was a hard-working Member, taking notes of debates, and regularly voting with the Government. He was appointed Constable of Flint Castle in about 1734, holding the post until 1750.

Just before the 1741 British general election Wynne was in dire financial straits as a result of his extravagant expenditure and a fall in income from the lead mines. He made a desperate appeal to Walpole, citing the cost of his campaigns against the Tories, and noting that he was in danger of losing his estate to Watkins Wynne. He was once again returned MP for Flint Boroughs after a hotly contested election and took his seat in the House of Commons. He voted with the Government on the chairman of the elections committee on 16 December 1741. However his opponent petitioned, and he was unseated by the anti-Walpole majority of the House on 22 March 1742.

== Later life and legacy ==
Within a year it was reported that Wynne's personal estate had been seized for debt and for a time he was imprisoned in the King's Bench Prison. He died intestate and without male heir at his house at Blackheath, on 5 August 1756 and was buried at St Margaret's, Lee on 8 August. His only surviving daughter Margaret, wife of Richard Hill Waring of Hayes, Shropshire, inherited the Leeswood estate but died without issue in 1793. He was succeeded in the baronetcy by special remainder by his brother John.

Parliament of Great Britain
Preceded by Salusbury Lloyd	Member of Parliament for Flint Boroughs; 1734–1742	Succeeded by Richard Williams
Baronetage of Great Britain
New creation	Baronet (of Lees Wood); 1731-1756	Succeeded by John Wynne
