= CGR 2nd Class 2-6-2TT =

Type of steam locomotive

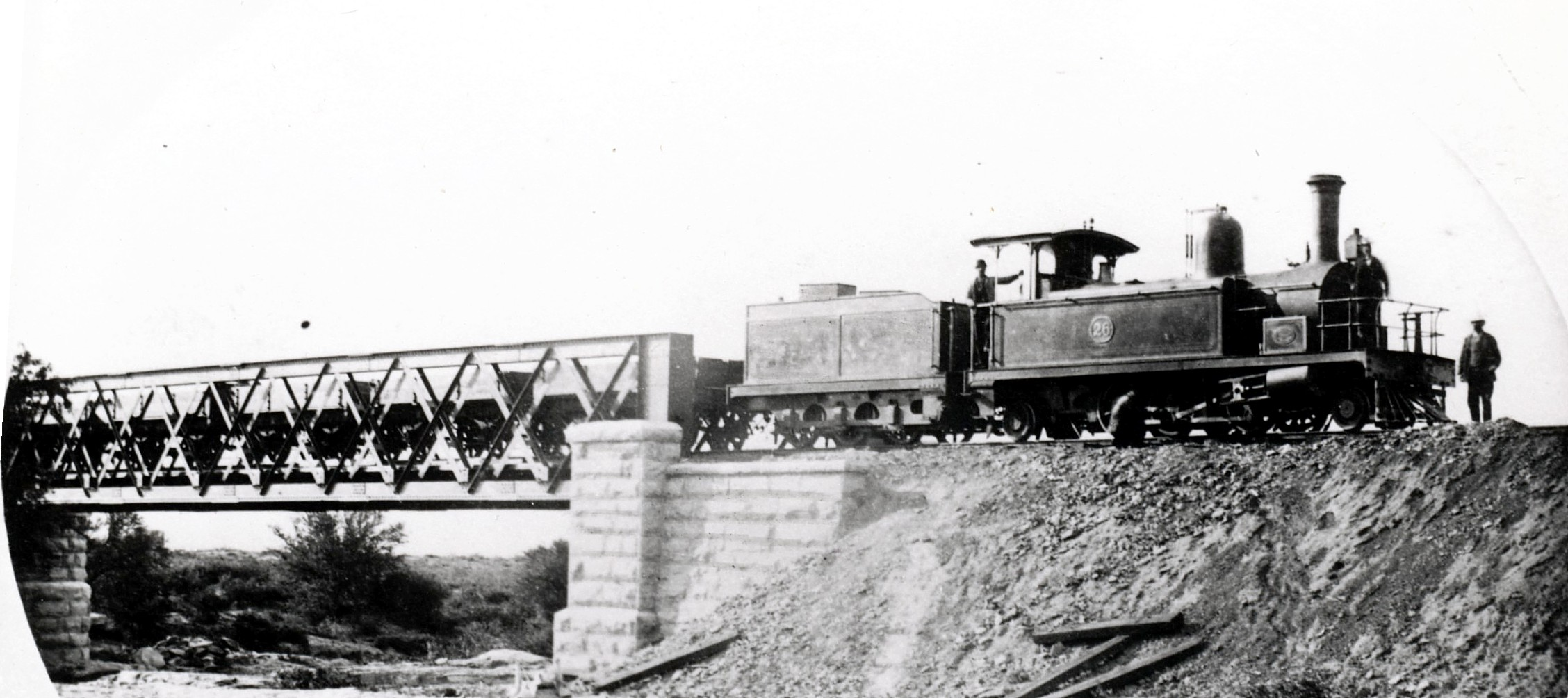
- CGR 2nd Class 2-6-2TT no. M26, with tender and "front porch railings", Fish River Bridge, c. 1881
Type and origin
- Power type: Steam
- Designer: Robert Stephenson and Company
- Builder: Robert Stephenson and Company; Avonside Engine Company; Kitson and Company
- Serial number: RS 2205–2210, 2332–2339, 2353 (engines), RS 2215–2217, 2221–2223 (tenders); Avonside 1110–1113, 1157–1158, 1193–1194, 1209–1210; Kitson 2038–2041
- Build date: 1875–1879
- Total produced: 29 (2 lost at sea)
Specifications
- Configuration
  - Whyte: 2-6-2T+T(Prairie)
  - UIC: 1’C1’n2t
- Driver: 2nd coupled axle
- Gauge: 3 ft 6 in (1,067 mm) Cape gauge
- Leading dia.: 24 in (610 mm)
- Coupled dia.: 38 in (965 mm)
- Trailing dia.: 24 in (610 mm)
- Wheelbase
  - Axle spacing (Asymmetrical): 1–2: 4 ft 8 in (1,422 mm); 2–3: 3 ft 4 in (1,016 mm)
  - Engine: 20 ft 3 in (6,172 mm)
  - Coupled: 8 ft (2,438 mm)
- Length
  - Over couplers: 27 ft (8,230 mm)
- Height: 12 ft (3,658 mm)
- Frame type: Plate
- Axle load: 9 LT 6 cwt 3 qtr (9,487 kg)
  - Leading: 2 LT 9 cwt (2,489 kg)
  - 1st coupled: 7 LT 13 cwt (7,773 kg)
  - 2nd coupled: 9 LT 6 cwt 3 qtr (9,487 kg)
  - 3rd coupled: 6 LT 17 cwt 1 qtr (6,973 kg)
  - Trailing: 2 LT 9 cwt (2,489 kg)
- Adhesive weight: 23 LT 17 cwt (24,230 kg)
- Loco weight: 28 LT 14 cwt 4 qtr (29,210 kg)
- Tender type: 2-axle
- Fuel type: Coal
- Fuel capacity: Engine: 0 LT 15 cwt (0.8 t); Tender: 2 LT (2.0 t)
- Water cap.: Engine: 650 imp gal (2,950 L); Tender: 900 imp gal (4,090 L)
- Firebox
  - Type: Round-top
  - Grate area: 11 sq ft (1.0 m^{2})
- Boiler
  - Pitch: 5 ft 10 1/2 in (1,791 mm)
  - Tube plates: 10 ft (3,048 mm)
- Boiler pressure: 130 psi (896 kPa)
- Safety valve: Salter
- Heating surface
  - Firebox: 58 sq ft (5.4 m^{2})
  - Tubes: 692 sq ft (64.3 m^{2})
  - Total surface: 750 sq ft (70 m^{2})
- Cylinders: Two
- Cylinder size: 15 in (381 mm) bore 20 in (508 mm) stroke
- Valve gear: Stephenson
- Train brakes: Clarke's chain brakes
- Couplers: Johnston link-and-pin
Performance figures
- Tractive effort: 11,546 lbf (51.36 kN) @ 75%
Career
- Operators: Cape Government Railways
- Class: 2nd Class
- Number in class: 27
- Numbers: E17-E26, M5-M10, M25-M33, W1-W2
- Delivered: 1875–1879
- First run: 1875

The Cape Government Railways 2nd Class 2-6-2TT of 1875 was a South African steam locomotive from the pre-Union era in the Cape of Good Hope.

The first mixed traffic locomotives to enter service on the new 3 feet 6 inches Cape gauge mainlines of the Cape Government Railways were 2-6-2 Prairie type side-tank engines which were delivered between 1875 and 1879. Four-wheeled tenders were also acquired and the locomotives could be operated in either a tank or tank-and-tender engine configuration, as circumstances demanded. These locomotives were later designated the Cape 2nd Class.

== Cape Government Railways ==
In 1872, the Cape Government took over the operation of all railways in the Cape of Good Hope and established the Cape Government Railways (CGR). Shortly before, it had been decided to adopt the narrower 3 feet 6 inches gauge instead of the existing 4 feet 8½ inches broad gauge for all further railway expansions, since it would decrease the cost of construction through the difficult terrain which lay inland from the three major ports of the Cape of Good Hope at Cape Town, Port Elizabeth and East London. This narrower gauge is still known as Cape gauge.

Since the operational area within the Colony was so vast, the CGR was divided into three semi-autonomous systems. The Eastern System was headquartered in East London, with A.E. Schmid as Chief Resident Engineer and J.D. Tilney as Locomotive Superintendent. The Midland System was headquartered in Port Elizabeth, with D. Jackson Scott as Chief Resident Engineer and Mr. Edwards as Locomotive Superintendent. The Western System was headquartered in Cape Town, with W.G. Brounger as Chief Resident Engineer as well as Consulting Engineer for the whole CGR, and Michael Stephens as Locomotive Superintendent.

== Manufacturers ==
The first Cape gauge mainline locomotives to enter service on the CGR were delivered in 1875. An order for six 2-6-2T Prairie type locomotives was placed with Robert Stephenson and Company, followed by a separate order for six four-wheeled tenders. The Stephenson locomotives were numbered W1 and W2 for the Western system and M7 to M10 for the Midland System.

At the same time, four more locomotives were ordered from the Avonside Engine Company. Two of the Avonside locomotives went to the Midland System, numbered M5 and M6. The other two were intended for the Eastern System, but they were lost at sea during delivery when the ship Memento sank off East London on 5 February 1876.

These locomotives were followed by nineteen more, all with optional tenders, ordered from three manufacturers.

- Four were delivered from Kitson and Company in 1876, numbered in the range from E17 to E20 for the Eastern system.
- Four were delivered from Avonside Engine Company in 1876 and 1878, numbered in the range from E21 to E24 for the Eastern system.
- Nine more were delivered from Robert Stephenson in 1878 and 1879, numbered in the range from M25 to M33 for the Midland system.
- The last two were delivered from Avonside Engine Company in 1879, numbered E25 and E26 for the Eastern system, to replace the two which had been lost at sea.

When a locomotive classification system was introduced by the CGR, these locomotives were designated 2nd Class.

== Characteristics ==
=== Tenders ===
While all the locomotives were delivered with four-wheeled tenders, they could be operated with or without the tenders, as circumstances demanded. In practice, they were used in the tank engine configuration while performing shunting or short-distance work, and in the tank-and-tender configuration when an increased coal and water supply was required during longer distance mainline work.

=== Brakes ===
The locomotives were equipped with Clarke's chain brakes. The braking system proved to be unsatisfactory, since breaking of the chain was not uncommon. In one instance this resulted in a bad accident with loss of life while a train was descending the Hex River rail pass.

The chain brake was operated by a 5/8 inch (16 millimetres) link chain, which was carried on sheaves underneath the train along the centre, connected by coupling hooks between carriages or trucks. Under each vehicle, the chain hanged slack while not in use. It passed under two pulleys which were attached to pulling-rods to operate the wooden brake blocks. To operate the brakes, the chain could be tightened from either end of the train. The guard's van could be used to retard a train on down grades, or to stop the entire train. In the event of a broken or disconnected chain, however, the brake system was useless. By c. 1876, a simple vacuum brake system was introduced as a reserve brake.

== Service ==
One of these locomotives is known to have been named, number W1 Byron. All of them were renumbered on occasions when the CGR altered its locomotive numbering systems c. 1886, 1888, 1890 and 1896.

By 1904, only three of them were still in service, being employed on shunting and construction tasks. By 1912, when locomotive classification and renumbering was implemented on the newly established South African Railways, none of these 2nd Class locomotives were still in service.

== Works numbers and renumbering ==
The builders, works numbers, years built, original numbers and known renumbering of the Cape 2nd Class of 1875 are listed in the table.

CGR 2nd Class 2-6-2T & TT of 1875
Builder	Works no.	Year built	Loco no.	1886 no.	1888 no.	1890 no.	1896 no.	1904 no.	Notes
Avonside	1110	1875							Lost at sea
Avonside	1111	1875							Lost at sea
Avonside	1112	1875	M5	105	105	205			
Avonside	1113	1875	M6	106	106	206			
Stephenson	2205	1875	W1	1					Byron
Stephenson	2206	1875	W2	2	2	2	2	2	
Stephenson	2207	1875	M7	107	107	207	407		
Stephenson	2208	1875	M8	108	108	208	408		
Stephenson	2209	1875	M9	109	109	209	409		
Stephenson	2210	1875	M10	110	110	210	410		
Kitson	2038	1876	E17	617	617	617	617		
Kitson	2039	1876	E18	618	618	618	618	618	
Kitson	2040	1876	E19	19	619	619	619	619	Scrapped 1911
Kitson	2041	1876	E20	20	620	620	620		
Avonside	1157	1876	E21	21	621	621	621		
Avonside	1158	1876	E22	22	622	622	622		
Avonside	1193	1878	E23	23	623	623	623		
Avonside	1194	1878	E24	24	624	624	624		
Stephenson	2332	1878	M25	125	125	225			
Stephenson	2333	1878	M26	126	126	226			
Stephenson	2334	1878	M27	127	127	227			
Stephenson	2335	1878	M28	128	128	228			
Stephenson	2336	1878	M29	129	129	229			
Stephenson	2337	1878	M30	130	130	230			
Stephenson	2338	1879	M31	131	131	231			
Stephenson	2339	1879	M32	132	132	232			
Stephenson	2353	1879	M33						Works 2352 or 2353
Avonside	1209	1879	E25	25	625	625	625		
Avonside	1210	1879	E26	26	626	626	626		

== Illustration ==
The photographs illustrate the locomotive in various configurations.

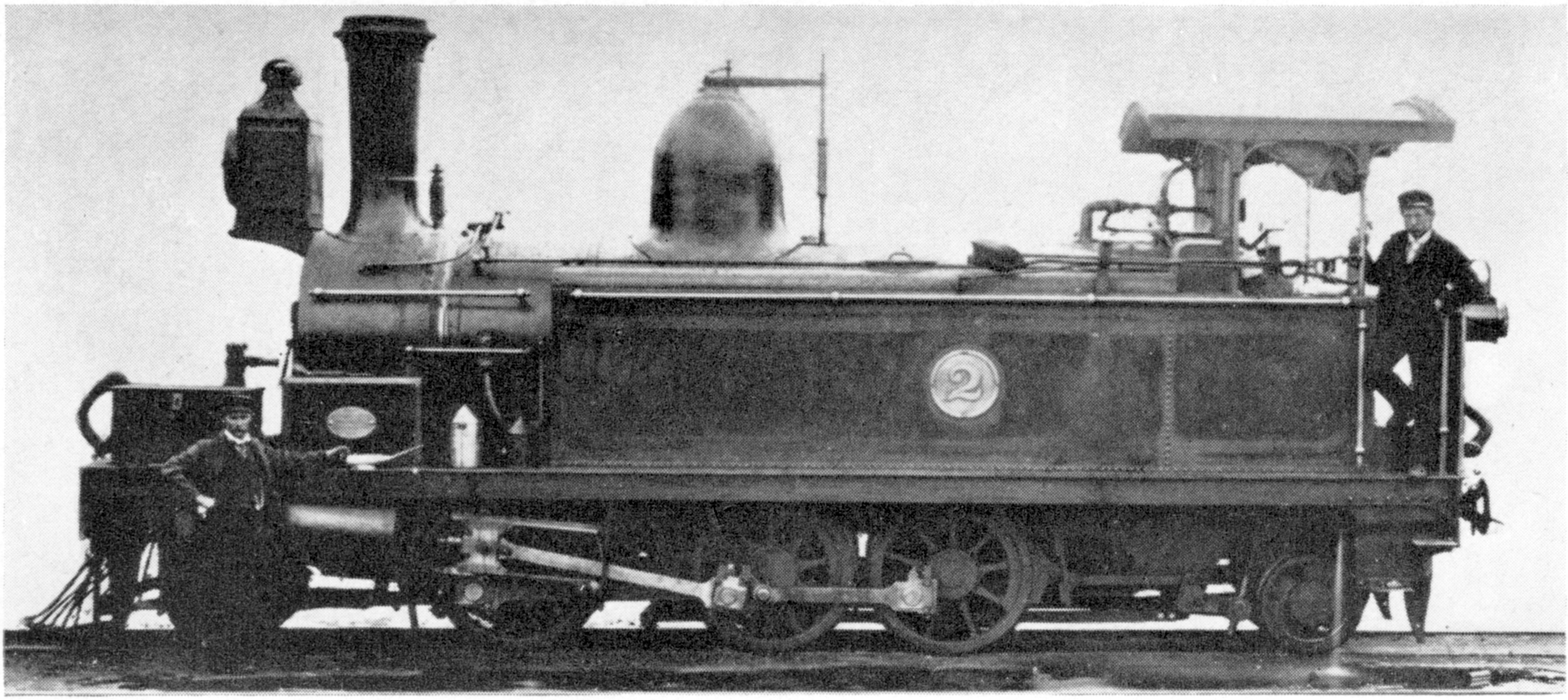
CGR 2nd Class no. W2 of the Western System, without tender or "front porch railings", c. 1899

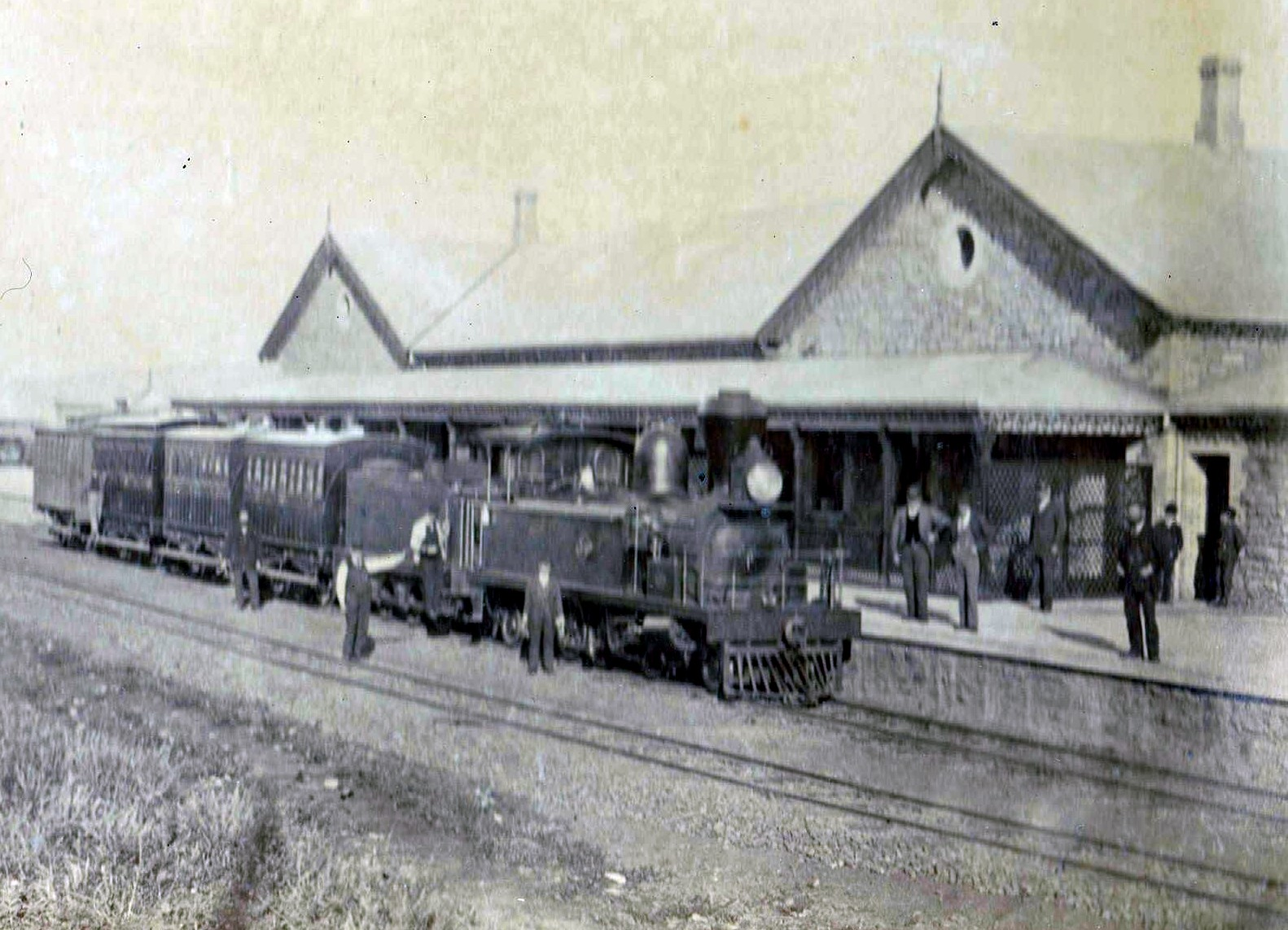
With tender, balloon chimney and "front porch railings", Grahamstown Station, c. 1880
