= Prussian T 6 =

Class of 12 German 2-6-2T locomotives

Prussian T 6 PKP OKl1
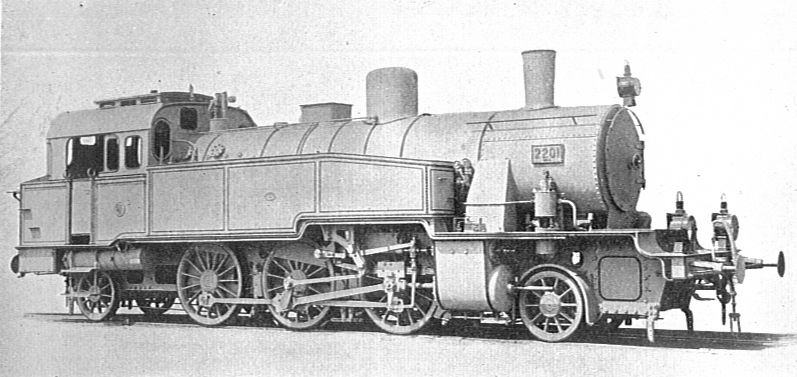
Type and origin
- Builder: Berliner Maschinenbau
- Build date: 1902
- Total produced: 12
Specifications
- Configuration
  - Whyte: 2-6-2T
- Gauge: 1,435 mm (4 ft 8 1/2 in)
- Leading dia.: 1,000 mm (3 ft 3 3/8 in)
- Driver dia.: 1,500 mm (4 ft 11 in)
- Trailing dia.: 1,000 mm (3 ft 3 3/8 in)
- Length
  - Over beams: 13,400 mm (43 ft 11 1/2 in)
- Axle load: 16.6 t (16.3 long tons; 18.3 short tons)
- Adhesive weight: 48.8 t (48.0 long tons; 53.8 short tons)
- Service weight: 79.0 t (77.8 long tons; 87.1 short tons)
- Fuel capacity: 2.5 t (5,500 lb) of coal
- Water cap.: 6.7 m^{3} (1,500 imp gal; 1,800 US gal)
- Boiler pressure: 14 kgf/cm^{2} (1.37 MPa; 199 lbf/in^{2})
- Heating surface
  - Firebox: 2.30 m^{2} (24.8 sq ft)
  - Evaporative: 154.50 m^{2} (1,663.0 sq ft)
- Cylinders: 3
- Cylinder size: 500 mm (19 11/16 in)
- Piston stroke: 630 mm (24 13/16 in)
Performance figures
- Maximum speed: 75 km/h (47 mph)
Career
- Retired: Early 1920s

The T 6 of the Prussian State Railways were a class of twelve passenger tank locomotives. They were intended as an alternative to the Prussian T 11 and T 12 classes on the routes of the Berlin Stadt (city), Ring and suburban network. A total of twelve locomotives were built in 1902 by Berliner Maschinenbau AG. Two went to the Altona Division, the other ten to the Berlin Division. The design was unusual – being a three-cylinder design. In comparison to the T 11 and T 12, they were the least economical of the three classes. They were also other technical reasons why no more T 6 locomotives were built.

The locomotives were later dispersed to other railway divisions. After World War I, five went to the Polish State Railways (PKP), who classified them as OKl1. The locomotives that remained in Germany were retired by the early 1920s
