= 2-6-2 =

Locomotive wheel arrangement

2-6-2 (Prairie)

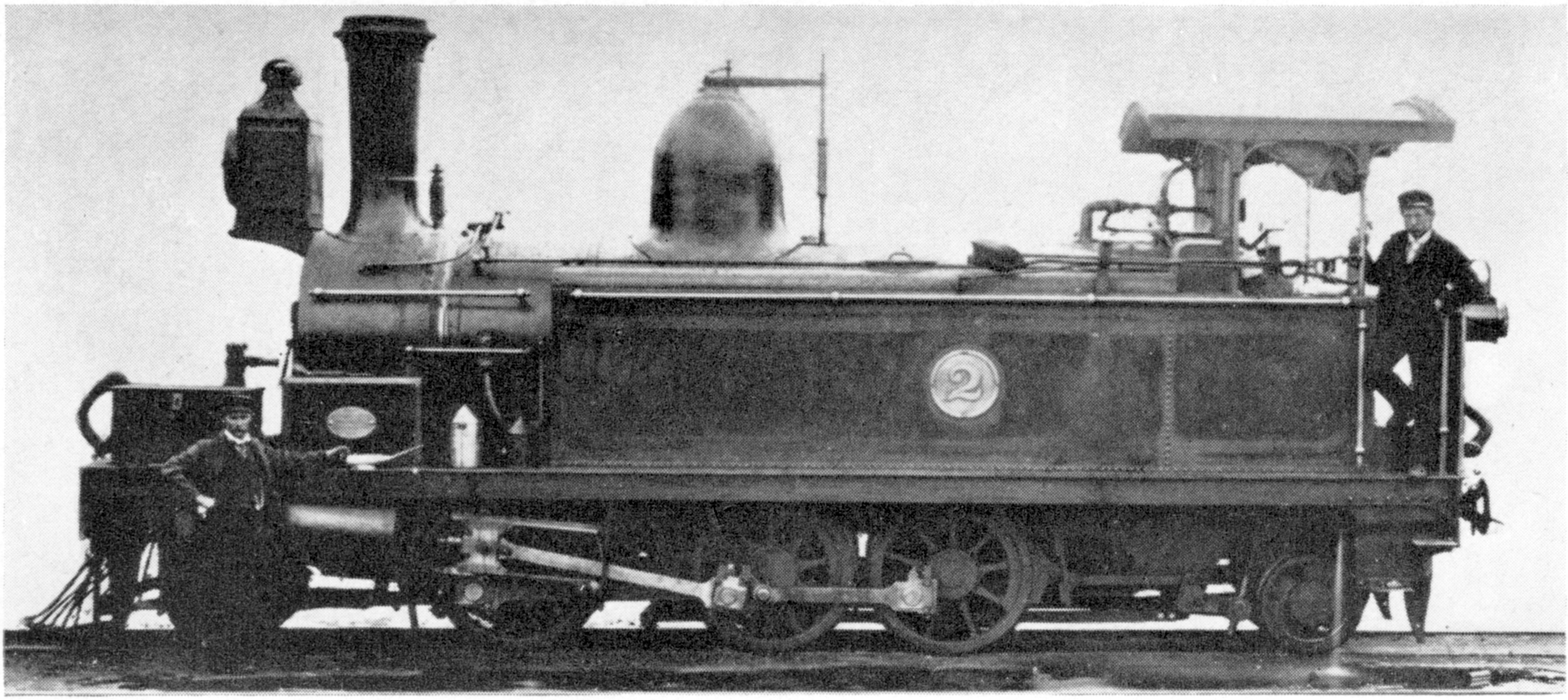
- CGR 2nd Class of 1875, the first 2-6-2
Equivalent classifications
- UIC class: 1C1, 1′C1′
- French class: 131
- Turkish class: 35
- Swiss class: 3/5
- Russian class: 1-3-1
First known tank engine version
- First use: 1875
- Country: Cape of Good Hope
- Locomotive: CGR 2nd Class 2-6-2TT
- Railway: Cape Government Railways
- Designer: Robert Stephenson and Company
- Builder: Robert Stephenson and Company
- Benefits: Better stability and more room for a larger coal bunker than a 2-6-0
First known tender engine version
- First use: 1884
- Country: New Zealand
- Railway: New Zealand Railways Department
- Builder: Nasmyth, Wilson and Company
- Evolved from: 2-6-0
- Evolved to: 4-6-2
- Benefits: Larger firebox than on a 2-6-0.
- Drawbacks: Instability at higher speeds.

Under the Whyte notation for the classification of steam locomotives, 2-6-2 represents the wheel arrangement of two leading wheels, six coupled driving wheels and two trailing wheels. This arrangement is commonly called a Prairie.

== Overview ==
The majority of American 2-6-2s were tender locomotives, but in Europe tank locomotives, described as 2-6-2T, were more common. The first 2-6-2 tender locomotives for a North American customer were built by Brooks Locomotive Works in 1900 for the Chicago, Burlington and Quincy Railroad, for use on the Midwestern prairies. The type was thus nicknamed the Prairie in North American practice. This name was often also used for British locomotives with this wheel arrangement.

As with the 2-10-2, the major problem with the 2-6-2 is that these engines have a symmetrical wheel layout, with the centre of gravity almost over the centre driving wheel. The reciprocation rods, when working near the centre of gravity, induce severe side-to-side nosing which results in intense instability if unrestrained either by a long wheelbase or by the leading and trailing trucks. Though some engines, like the Chicago and Great Western of 1903, had the connecting rod aligned onto the third driver, most examples were powered via the second driver and were prone to the nosing problem.

== Usage ==
=== Australia ===
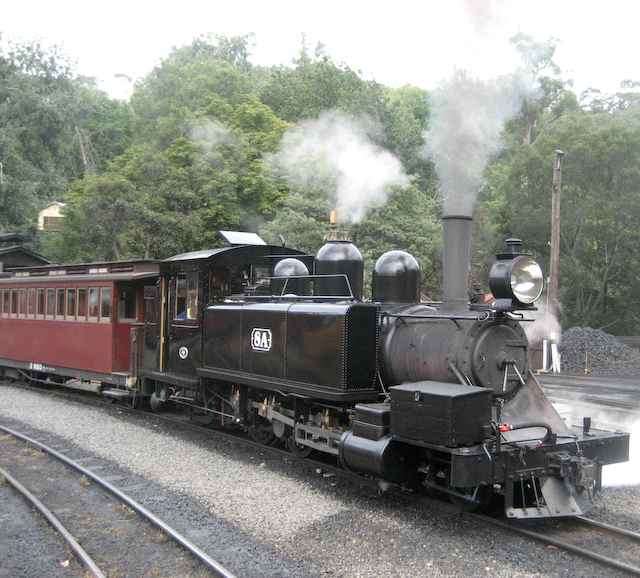
Victorian Railways class NA 2-6-2 tank locomotive on the Puffing Billy Railway

In New South Wales a class of twenty locomotives, the Z26 class, formerly the (I)17 class, entered service in 1892 and operated until the end of steam. Two are preserved, no. 2606 at the Rail Transport Museum at Thirlmere and no. 2605 at the State Mine Museum in Lithgow.

The principal 2-6-2T locomotives which were built for the 2 ft 6 in (762 mm) narrow gauge system of the Victorian Railways (VR), are the now famous "Puffing Billy" engines. Two of these little locomotives arrived from Baldwin Locomotive works in 1898 and a total of seventeen saw service throughout the state on the various narrow gauge timber and gold lines, including the Wangaratta and Walhalla. When the VR decided to close the Upper Ferntree Gully to Gembrook narrow gauge route in the mid-1950s, enthusiasts mounted a successful campaign to retain the line as a preservation project. Today, the Puffing Billy Railway is one of Victoria's main tourist attractions has a fleet of saved and modified 2-6-2T engines on its active steam roster and.

The Silverton Tramway operated two 2-6-2T locomotives from 1891, both of which are preserved in South Australia.

Queensland Railways operated one 2-6-2 tender engine of the B16 1/2 class. It was built in August 1918 by the North Ipswich Railway Workshops as an experimental engine burning coke instead of coal. After nearly 9 years burning coke, it was converted to coal in 1927. The engine spent its working life on the Brisbane to Ipswich line working coal trains. It was withdrawn in February 1950.

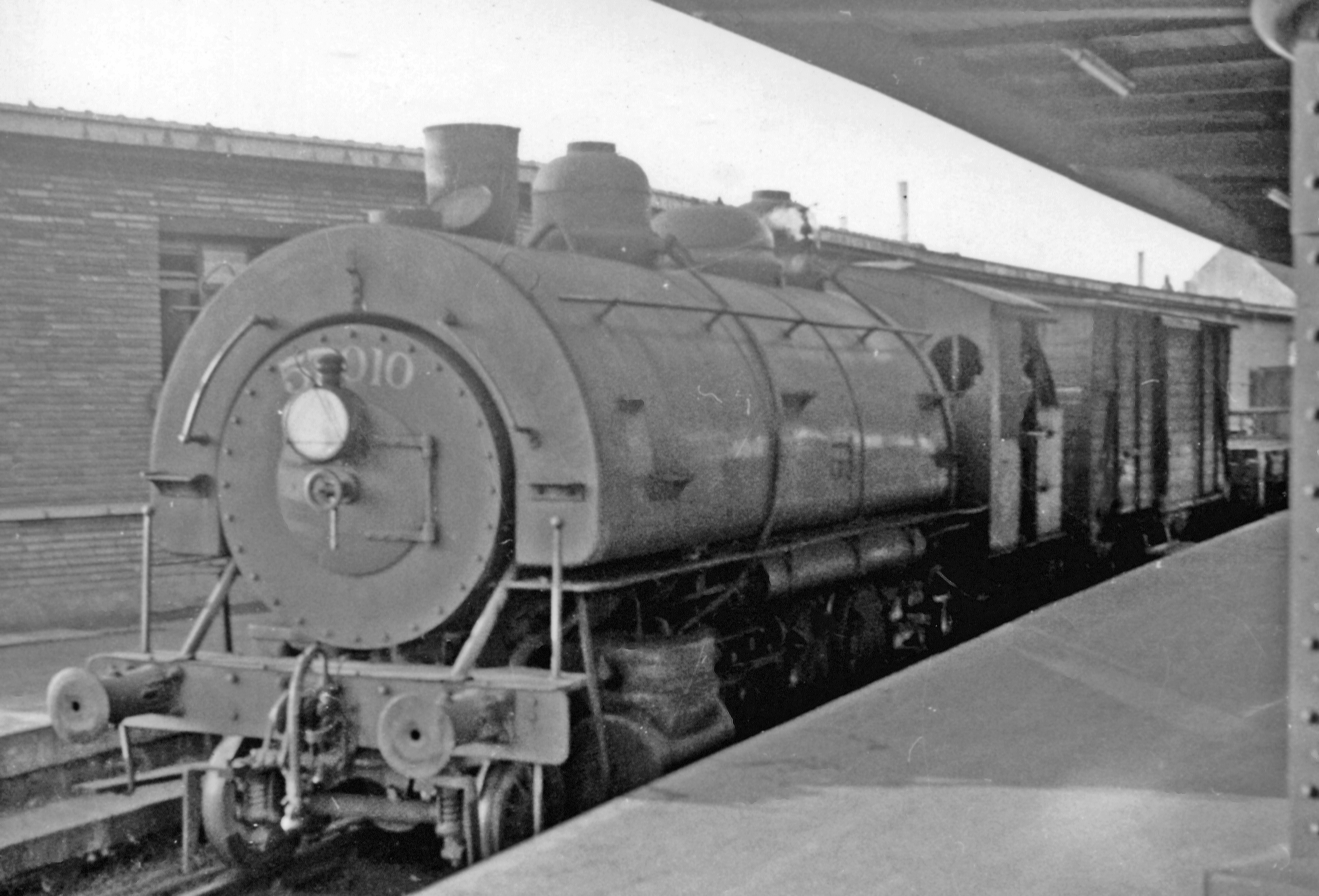
A Type 57 at Brussels South, 1957.

=== Belgium ===
The Belgian State Railways ordered 91 inside-cylinder 2-6-2 tank engines between 1878 and 1881 (Belgian State Railways Type 4) with large drivers and side tanks longer than the boiler. They hauled commuter trains and fast trains on short lines. Some of them survived the war and were used on local trains until 1930.

After World War I, the Belgian State Railways were desperately needing new engines in order to replace the ones that were lost or damaged during the war. They purchased 63 2-6-2 Saddle tank engines from the Railway Operating Division (Belgian State Railways Type 22, later SNCB Type 57) and used them for switching and light freight trains until the 1960s.

=== Canada ===
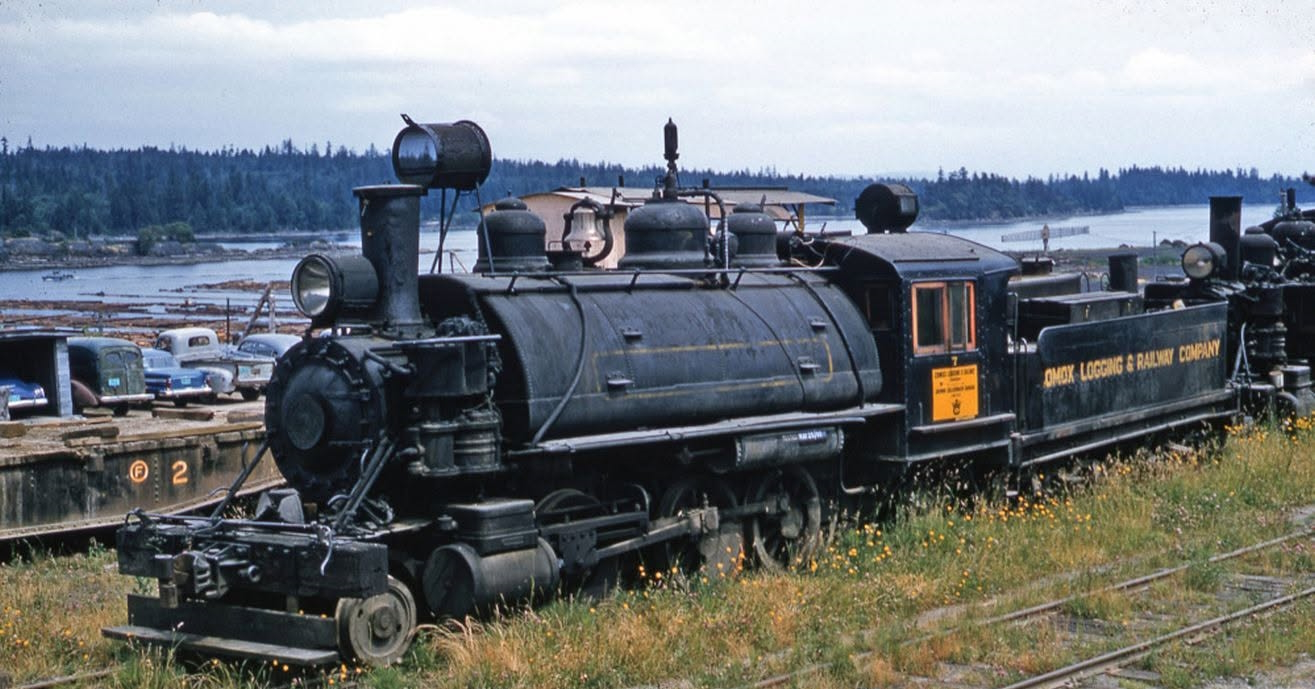
Pacific Great Eastern No. 2, a 2-6-2ST type, in 1960 during its logging career with Comox Logging and Railway

While the 2-6-2 type was not used by Canadian National or Canadian Pacific, they were popular on small logging railways in Western Canada. Regional lines such as the Comox Logging and Railway Company, Canadian Forest Products Company, and MacMillan Bloedel Limited were prominent owners of 2-6-2 locomotives for their logging operaitons.

Several of these locomotives have been preserved, including Pacific Great Eastern 2, the only preserved 2-6-2ST locomotive in Canada, and MacMillan Bloedel & Powell River Ltd. 1077, which previously operated excursions in Fort Steele, British Columbia. Comox Logging and Railway No. 2 is preserved on static display in Courtenay.

=== Germany ===
Tank locomotives with this wheel arrangement spread very quickly in Germany after the good Austrian experience with the Series 30. The Württembergische T 5, the Badische VI b and the Badische VI c as well as the saxon Sächsische XIV HT, all developed before the First World War, were successful designs, many locomotives of these series were used well into the 1960s. Only the prussian T6 was a bad design, the few examples were taken out of service shortly after the First World War. From 1928 the Deutsche Reichsbahn-Gesellschaft procured over 500 units of their class 64 standard steam locomotives. Private railways such as the Eutin-Lübeck Railway with locomotives 11 to 14 also procured tank locomotives with this wheel arrangement in the interwar period.

In contrast, the first tender locomotives were initially unsuccessful. The Oldenburgische S 10, which was delivered in three copies in 1916, was extremely uneconomical due to the boiler, which was badly matched to the steam engine, and was taken out of service after less than ten years. The Badische IV g from Baden was a downright faulty construction, neither performing well on flat ground nor on the Schwarzwaldbahn. The Baden State Railways gave away the five copies in 1918 in the course of deliveries after the Armistice of Compiègne to France. The French side also wanted to get rid of the locomotives soon and agreed to return them to Germany, which was again refused in Baden. They were finally retired in France in the early 1930s.

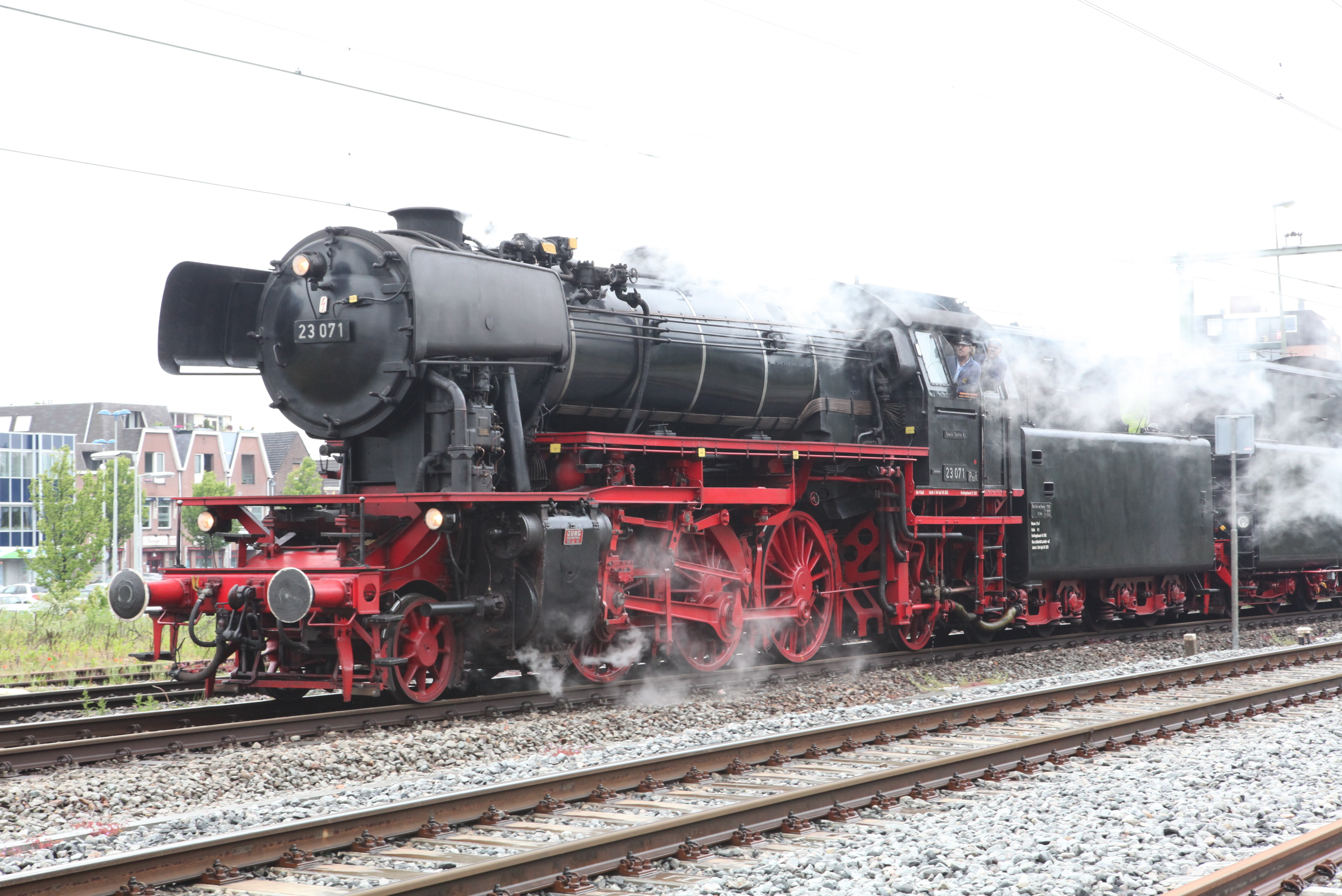
DB locomotive 23 071

It was not until 1941 that the Deutsche Reichsbahn received prairie tender locomotives again. The series 23, which was procured in two prototypes, was to be procured as a passenger locomotive in up to 800 copies from 1941 as a replacement for the prussian P8, but the Second World War made these plans obsolete in favor of urgently required freight locomotives. After the war, both the Deutsche Bundesbahn with the DB class 23 and the Deutsche Reichsbahn in the GDR with the DR class 23.10 each procured a good 100 new prairie locomotives. However, due to structural change, the last units remained in operation for an average of less than 20 years and were taken out of service around the mid-1970s.

=== Hungary ===
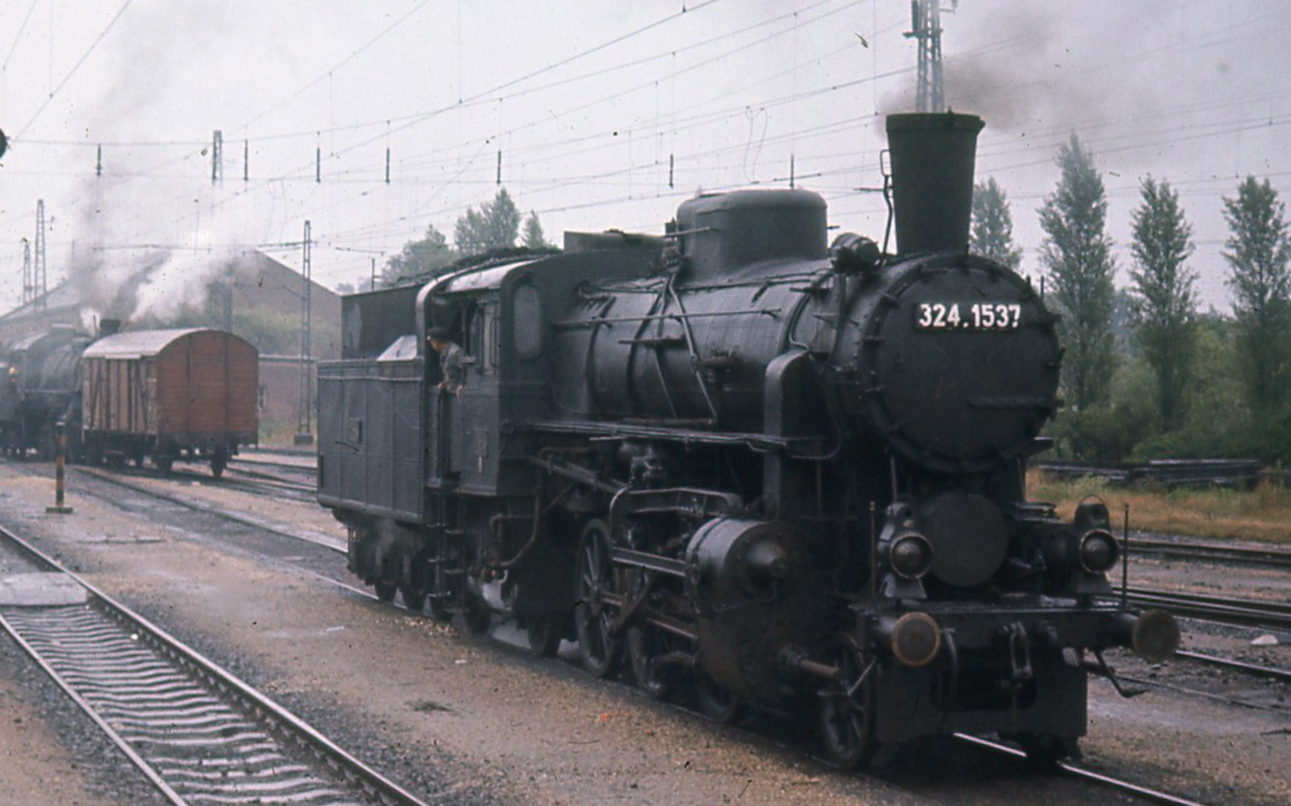
Standard Hungarian Railways 2-6-2 of 324 class, introduced in 1909

The most numerous steam locomotive type used in Hungary was the MÁV class 324 2-6-2, built from 1909 onwards, which were still at work in the last days of steam.

The Hungarian State Railways (MÁV) also ran three important classes of 2-6-2 tank engines. These were the large MÁV class 342 class built from 1917, and the smaller MÁV class 375 and MÁV class 376.

=== Indonesia ===
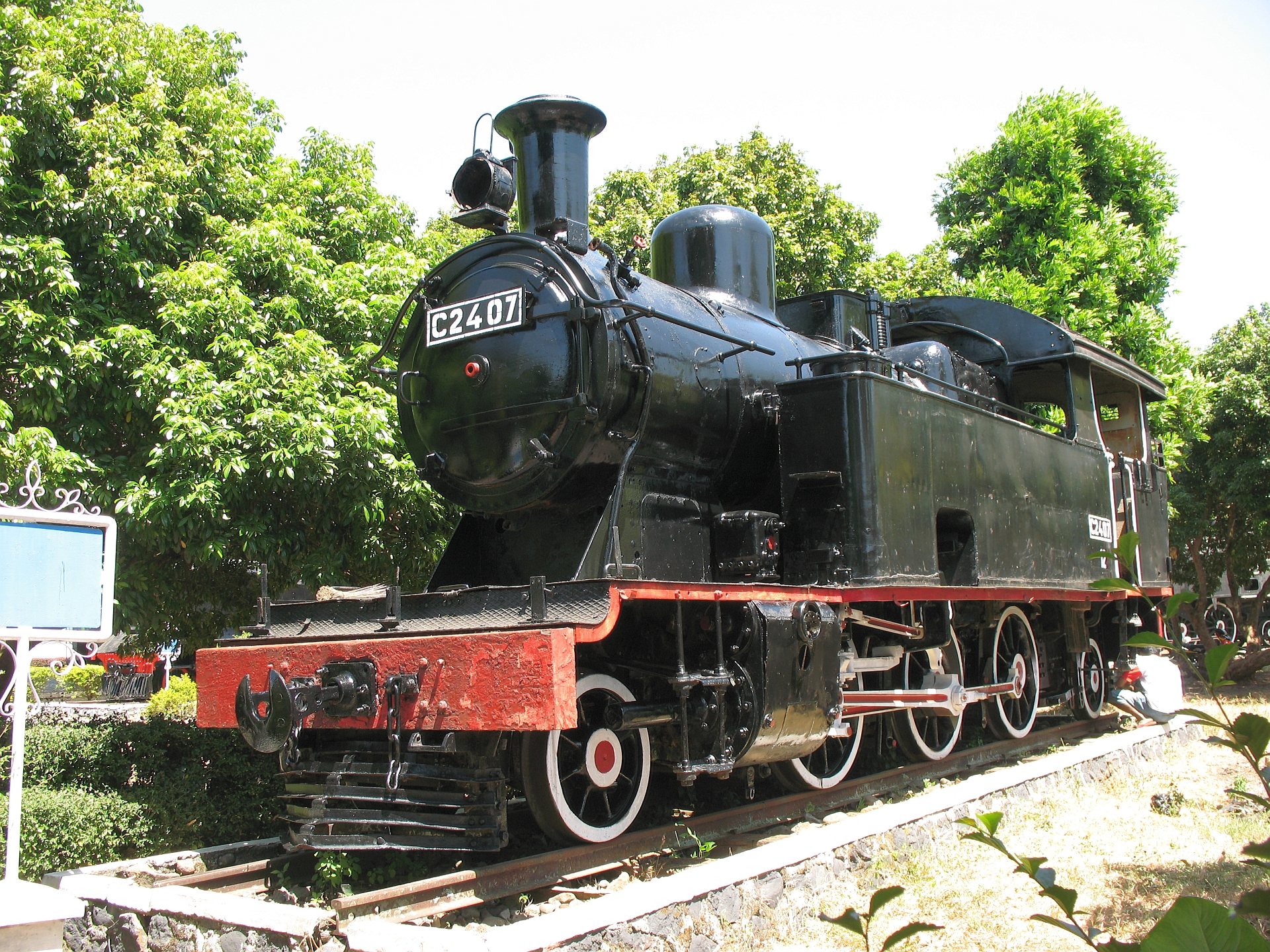
NIS 277 or DKA C24 07

With the successful railway line construction between Djocjakarta (Yogyakarta)–Magelang in 1902, Magelang–Setjang (Secang)–Ambarawa in 1903–1905 and branch line between Setjang–Temangoeng (Temanggung)–Parakan in 1907, Nederlandsch-Indische Spoorweg Maatschappij (NIS) as a private railway company of Dutch East Indies (now Indonesia) felt the need of new locomotives as a complement to their 0-6-0T NIS Class 250 which had been operational beforehand. They ordered a new special 2-6-2T from (Werkspoor, N.V., Amsterdam), Netherlands with specifications has a maximum axle weight of 10 tons with an effective tractive force of 5000 kg, could pass on the 3 ft 6 in (1,067 mm) gauge Riggenbach rack line between Jambu–Bedono–Gemawang which has 6.5% incline with 8 carriages or wagons at a speed of 30 km/h (18.6 mph) and could pull 200 wagons on flat line also at a speed of 30 km/h. In addition, it has 3 sight glasses with a function to keep the water at the specified level when passing 6.5% grade which prevent any hazardous condition.

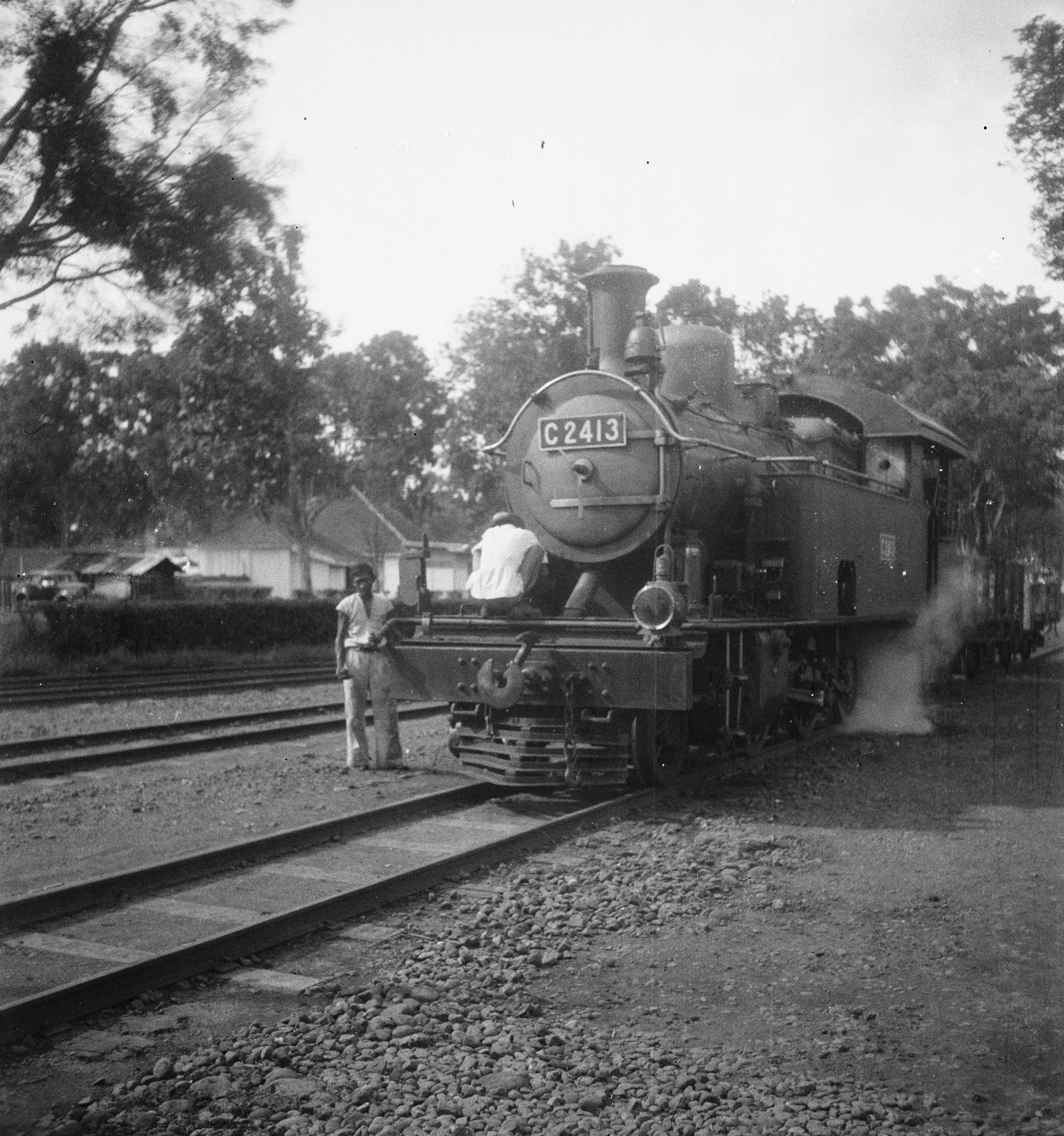
C24 13 in 1949

The NIS received 15 units of their 2-6-2T, classified as NIS Class 270 (271–285) and came in two batches in 1909–1912. The NIS Class 270 were the most modern locomotives of the time, surpassing the capabilities of many NIS locomotives which were manufactured by Germans. These NIS 2-6-2Ts were the first superheated engine, a split-teak wood burner, using Walschaert's steam flow systems and Belpaire type firebox. The smokestack is equipped with dumper valve which could be opened using a motor servo connected to the driver's cabin. The temperature measurement in the firebox using a remote sensing pyrometer made by Steinle & Hartug and placed in the superheater box, while the dial could be read from the cabin. The cylinder engine lubrication system using an eight-joint system by Alex Friedmann from Vienna, Austria. The brake systems could be said complicated at the time, using hand brake, steam cylinder brake, Exter type emergency brake and Riggenbach type rear pressure brake. These locomotives dominated the Temanggung–Parakan line along with the NIS Class 250 counterparts, they could also be operated on steep rack line between Jambu–Bedono–Gemawang that could only be passed by rack locomotive just like 0-4-2T NIS Class 230 (DKA B25). Apart from operating on those lines, NIS Class 270 also operated on the Semarang–Gundih to Surabaya lines. During Second World War, the NIS Class 270 were renumbered as C24 by the Japanese and one unit of them was damaged during the war. After Indonesian Independence, by their railway administrative PJKA or Perusahaan Jawatan Kereta Api still placed them mainly at Jogja/Yogya area and around 1970s they were also dispersed around Central Java such as Purwokerto. The closure of the Yogyakarta-Magelang-Parakan and Ambarawa lines put an end to the duties of many C24 locomotives, from 14 of them only C24 07 is preserved at Ambarawa Railway Museum.

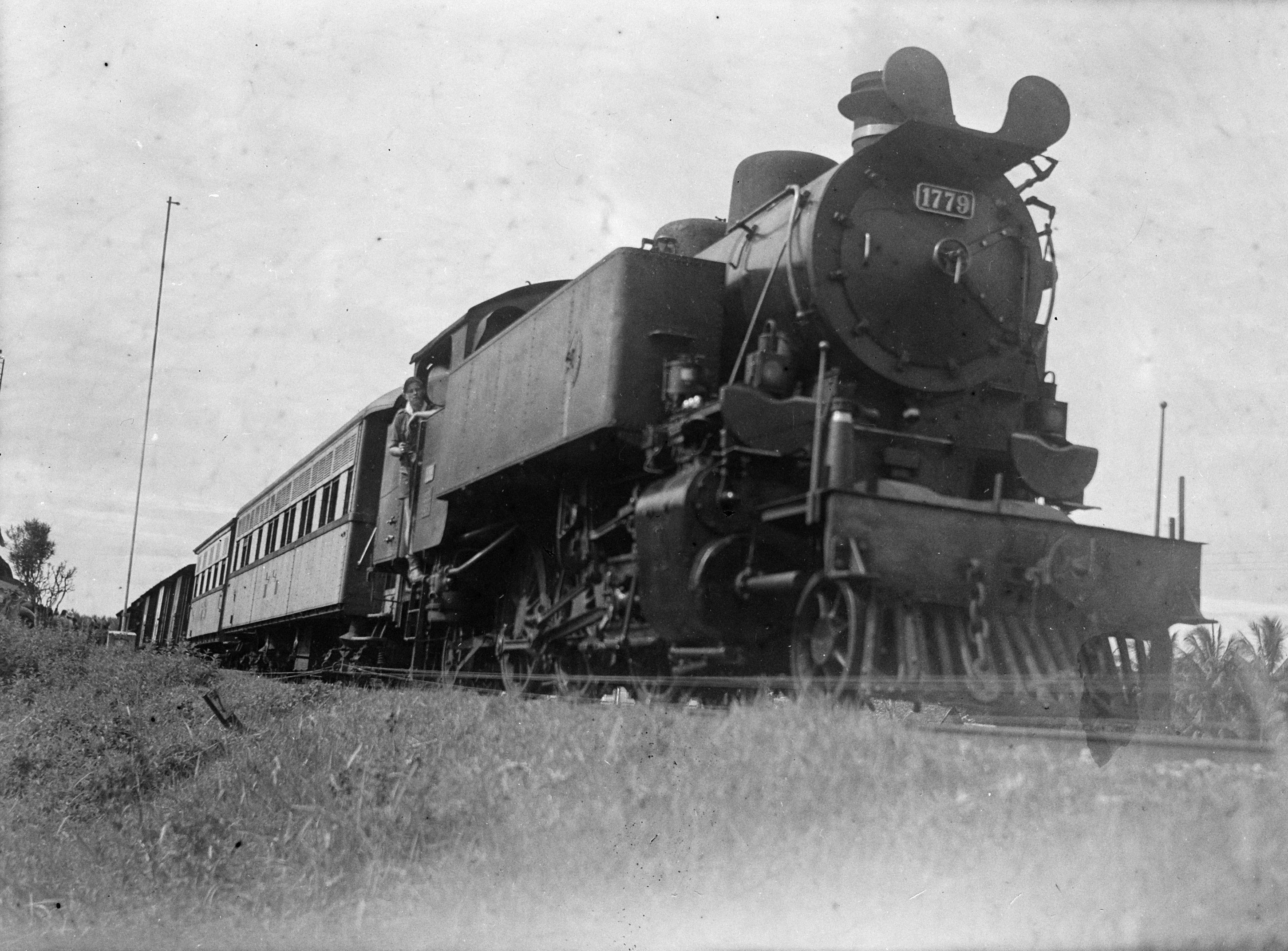
The SS 1779 or DKA C30 79 of South Sumatra division or ZSS

Staatsspoorwegen (SS) imported 44 2-6-2Ts from Hanomag, Hohenzollern, Borsig and Werkspoor came in 1929–1930 and classified as SS Class 1700. These SS 1700s were needed by SS to fulfil congested volume of passenger and freight traffics on mountain lines of West Java, especially on Bandung–Banjar line. SS forced to postpone the purchase of new locomotives from Europe for South and West Sumatra divisions due to Great Depression in 1929. As a result, 23 units were allocated to South Sumatra and 3 units to West Sumatra. The SS 1700s were designated as universal locomotive, they could be used to work freight and passenger trains on both branch and main lines. In addition, these modern locomotives have 660 horsepower (hp) output could work on both flat and mountain lines, 10.796 mm long, have 1.350 mm driving wheels diameter and could gain speeds of 75 kilometres per hour (46.6 miles per hour). During Japanese occupation in 1942–1945, the SS 1700 were renumbered as C30 class and many of these locomotives were brought by them to Malay Peninsula and Indochina just like Singapore and Cambodia while 3 units of them were moved to Muaro–Pekanbaru death railway line in Sumatra. Furthermore, those to which Japanese transferred abroad had been re-gauged to 1,000 mm, and most of them had been scrapped after the war ended. Currently, only C3065 and C3082 are on display at Transportation Museum of Taman Mini Indonesia Indah and Lubuklinggau. While a locomotive that is also suspected of being a C30 class was also found as a monument in front of a pagoda in Phnom Penh, Cambodia in a derelict condition.

=== Italy ===
The Ferrovie dello Stato Italiane (Italian State Railways) built the 151-strong compound FS Class 680 for express trains from 1907 to 1911. The FS Class 685, built in 271 units from 1912 to 1928, was its non-compound and superheated version, and proved very successful, to the point that all but 31 of the earlier Class 680 were rebuilt as 685 (bringing the size of the class to 391 locomotives).

=== New Zealand ===
A fleet of five tank engines, built by Manning Wardle of Leeds in England, were supplied to New Zealand in 1884–85. The private Wellington and Manawatu Railway (WMR) used them for construction, maintenance and local service work. Three were later taken over as the New Zealand Railways (NZR) W^{H} class in 1908.

The second batch of Prairie locomotives was built to an order for the New Zealand Railways Department, with the initial order for ten being let to Nasmyth, Wilson and Company of Manchester, England. This later became the NZR V class which, due to political interference and their being overweight, did not go into traffic until 1890.

New Zealand's third batch of Prairie locomotives was ordered by the WMR in 1884. Their design was almost identical to that of the NZR V class, though they were slightly heavier. They could burn any light fuel, coal or wood as available, and entered service in 1886, soon after the WMR started operating. In 1908, with the purchase of the company by the NZR, they were also awarded the V classification.

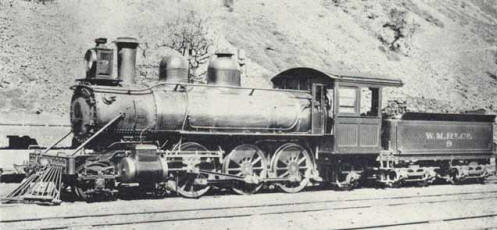
NZR N class prior to its NZR service, as No. 9 of the Wellington and Manawatu Railway, at Paekakariki

In 1885, Baldwin Locomotive Works built New Zealand's fourth batch of Prairie locomotives. These were to become the NZR N class. Six were delivered in 1885 and were of an almost identical design to the previous, but altered to utilise off-the-shelf components supplied by Baldwin. In 1901, four more were built for the NZR, but these were fitted with piston valves actuated by Walschaerts valve gear. In 1891, two of these locomotives had also been built to the same design for the WMR. In 1908, with the purchase of the WMR by NZR, all of these engines were classified as N class.

Between 1894 and 1904, four similar engines were built by Baldwin for the WMR. In 1908, these became the NZR's NA class and NC class, with two units each.

The NZR's Addington Workshops joined the list of Prairie suppliers in 1889, producing the first of two NZR W class tank engines. These were followed between 1892 and 1901 with eleven similar NZR WA class tank engines.

Baldwin followed this up with ten similar NZR WB class Prairie tank engines in 1898.

In 1930–31, after nearly thirty years of 4-6-2 Pacific and 4-6-4 Baltic locomotive production, New Zealand dusted off its Prairie plans with the release into service of twenty-four NZR C class 2-6-2 locomotives, designed primarily for shunting and branch line work.

=== Poland ===
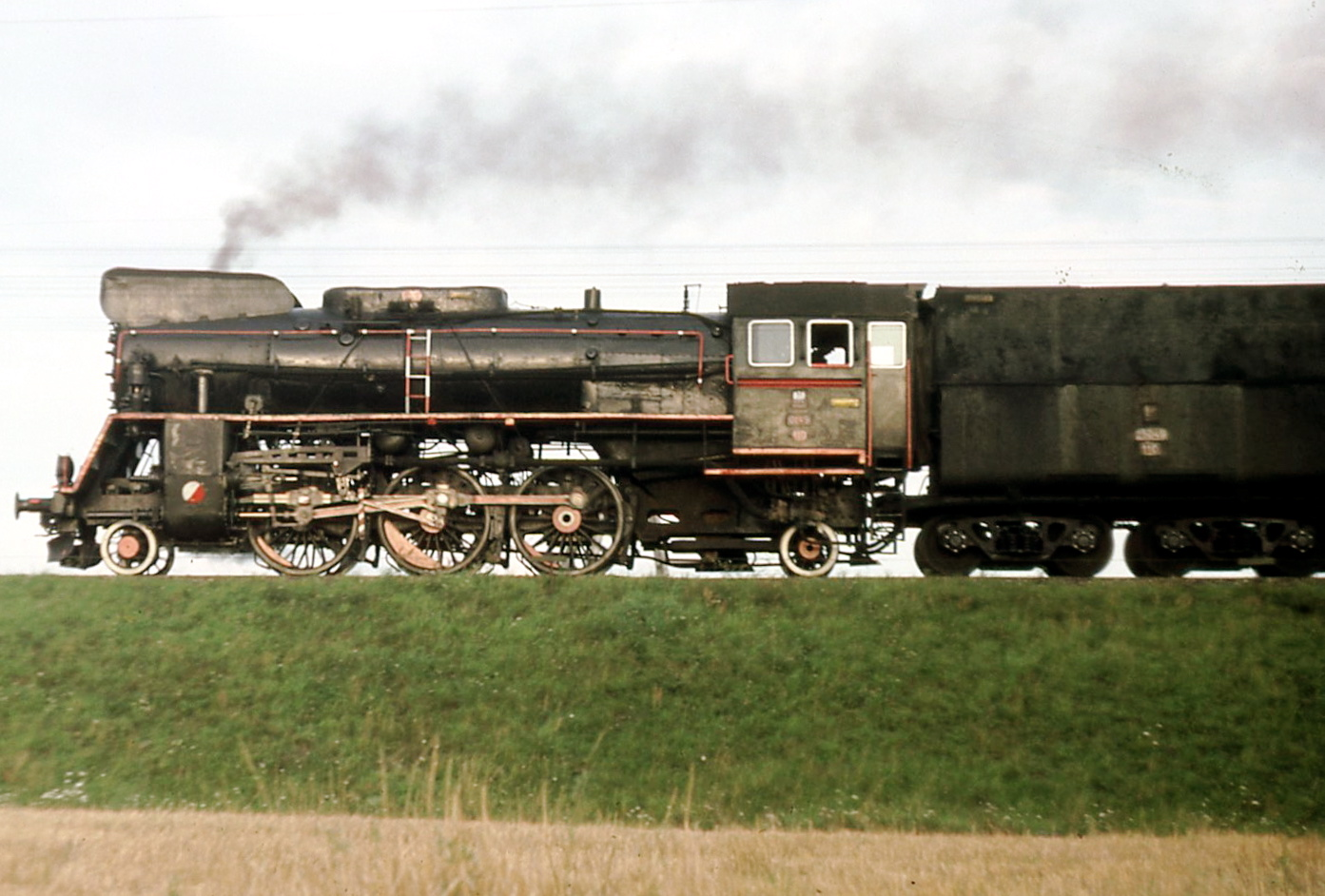
PKP Class Ol49 at work in summer 1976

The H. Cegielski Metal Works in Poznań produced 122 OKl27 class 2-6-2T locomotives for the Polish State Railways (PKP) during the period between 1928 and 1933.

Between 1951 and 1954, Fablok built a series of 116 Ol49 class 2-6-2 tender locomotives for the PKP.

=== Romania ===
Romania designed the 131.000 Class to replace the older Hungarian MAV locomotives used on Căile Ferate Române (CFR) secondary lines. A total of 67 locomotives were built at Reşiţa Works between 1939 and 1942, numbered 131.001 to 131.067.

=== Russia & Soviet Union ===
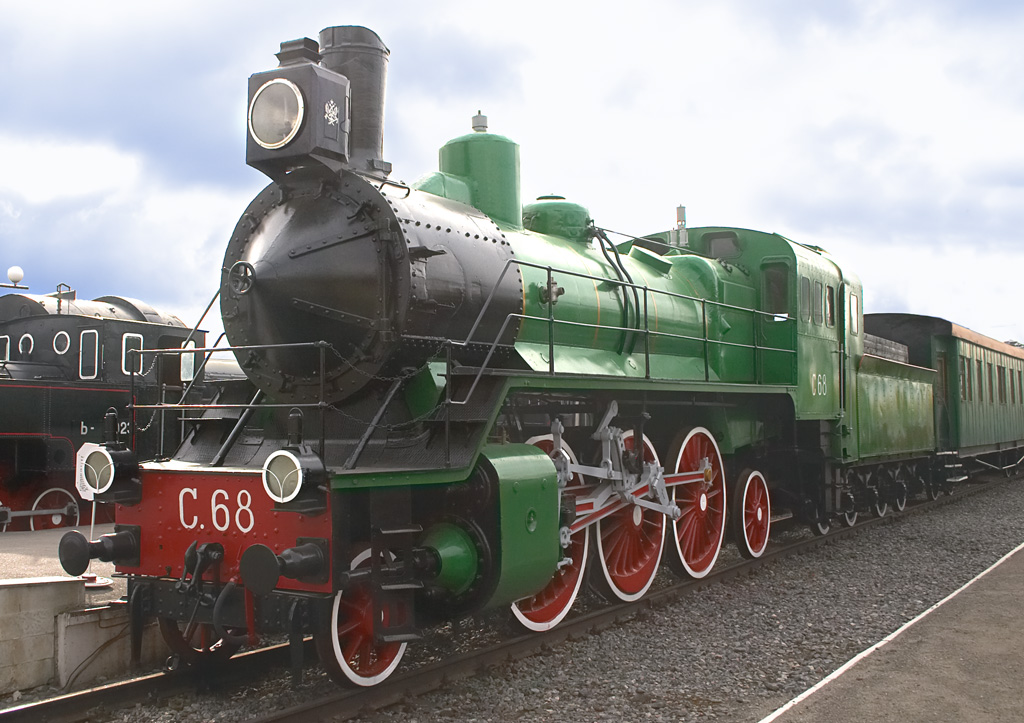
Russian S-series 1-3-1

In Russia, the 2-6-2 was the standard passenger locomotive. They were represented by the pre-revolutionary S (С) (Sormovskij) series and the post-revolutionary Su (Су) series locomotives, the latter of which appeared in 1928. The pre-revolutionary S-series locomotives had the characteristic pointed nose, absent on the Su locomotive. The suffix 'u' means usilenny which translates as "strengthened" or "uprated". Several Su-series locomotives are preserved in working order. However, only one pre-revolutionary S-series locomotive is still around, number S.68. It is preserved at the Saint Petersburg railway museum.

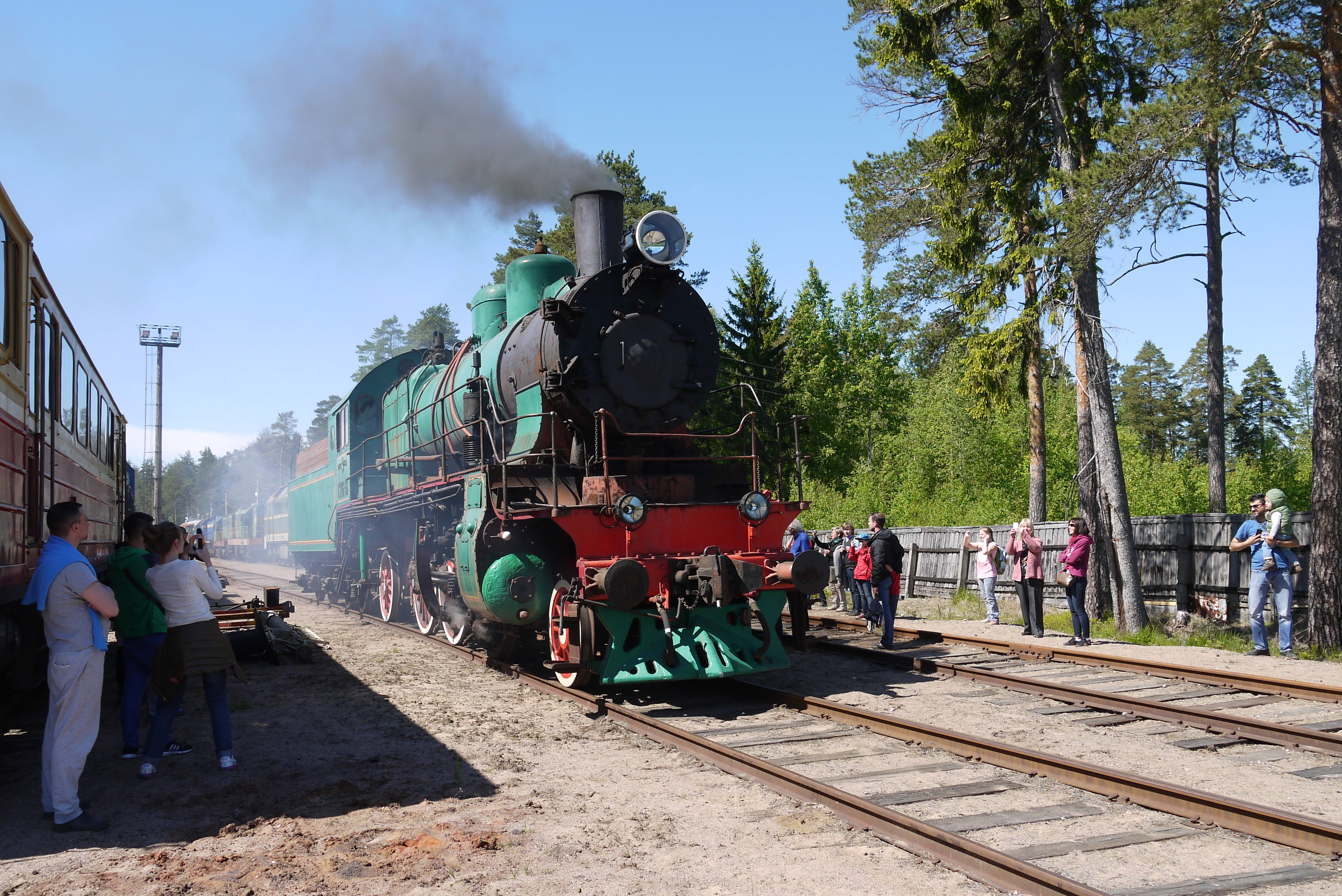
Su 206-56 in steam at the Lebyazhye Railway Museum, Lebyazhye, Lomonosovsky District, Leningrad Oblast, Russia

The Su was the standard passenger engine on most mainline routes and it was only on the key trunk lines that the IS class 2-8-4, or later the P36 4-8-4, would be used. Therefore, the majority of passenger miles were hauled by an Su (Су).

Visually, the Su was the last true Russian-look design before the American influence of high running boards, bar frames and boxpok wheels became the norm. The Su retained such features as a clerestory skylight in the cab roof and handrails on the outside of the running board. These handrails were a result of the harsh Russian winters, when ice would build up on the running boards, making them highly dangerous. Enginemen had fallen to their death from moving trains and the fitting of promenade deck style handrails was a safety measure ordered by the Tsar in pre-revolutionary times. These features, combined with the high 17 feet (5.182 metres) loading gauge, combined to give the locomotives a uniquely Russian appearance.

=== South Africa ===
The world's first 2-6-2 Prairie type locomotives were also the first locomotives to enter service on the new Cape gauge mainline of the Cape Government Railways. They were 2-6-2 side-tank engines that were delivered between 1875 and 1879. Four-wheeled tenders were also acquired on a subsequent order and the locomotives could be operated in either a tank or tank-and-tender configuration, as circumstances demanded. These locomotives were later designated the Cape 2nd Class.

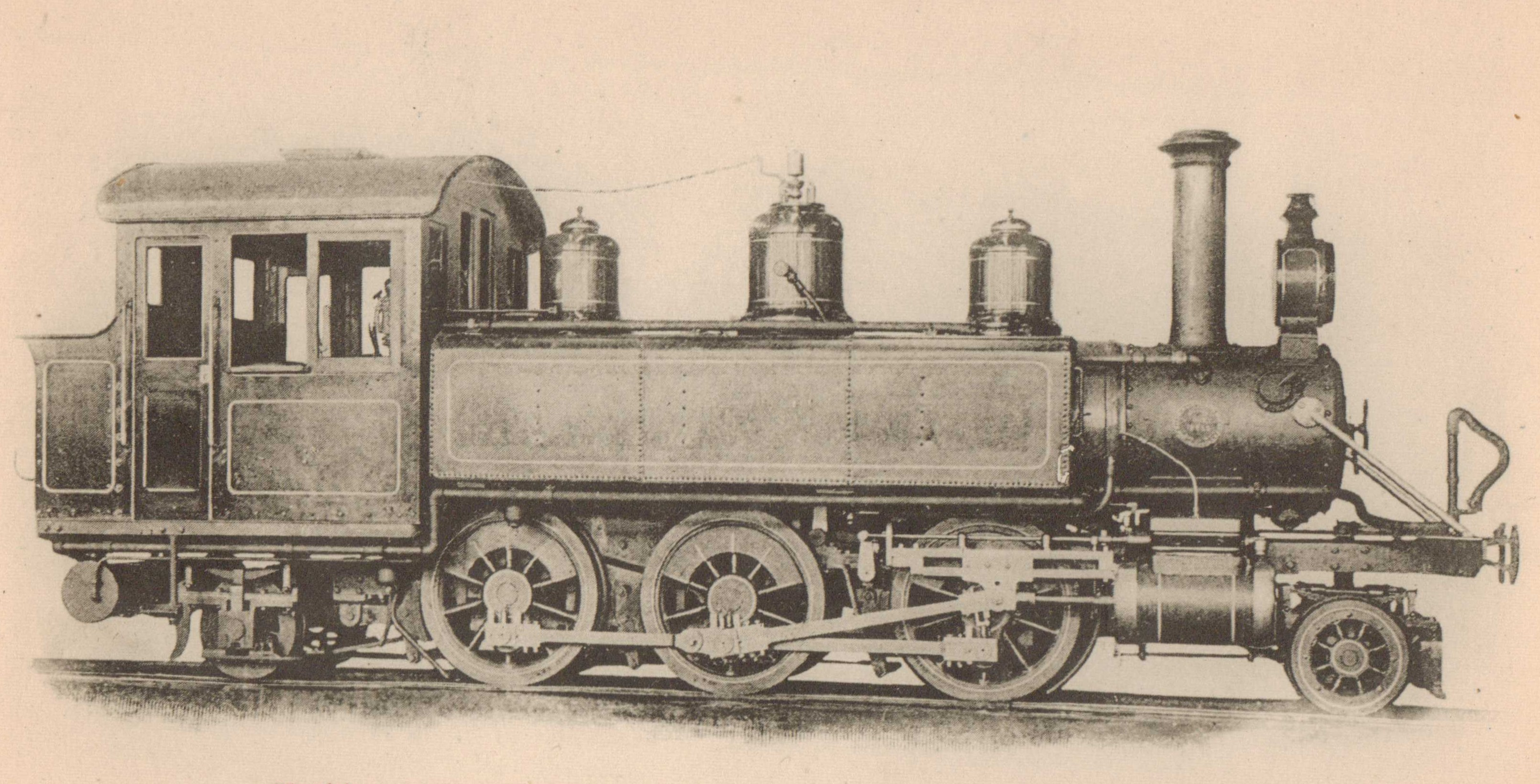
Zululand Railway Co. no. 1, c. 1901

In 1901, the Zululand Railway Company, contracted for the construction of the Natal North Coast line from Verulam to the Tugela River, acquired one 2-6-2 side-tank locomotive as construction engine from Baldwin Locomotive Works. Upon completion of the line in 1903, the locomotive was taken onto the roster of the Natal Government Railways and was designated Class I.

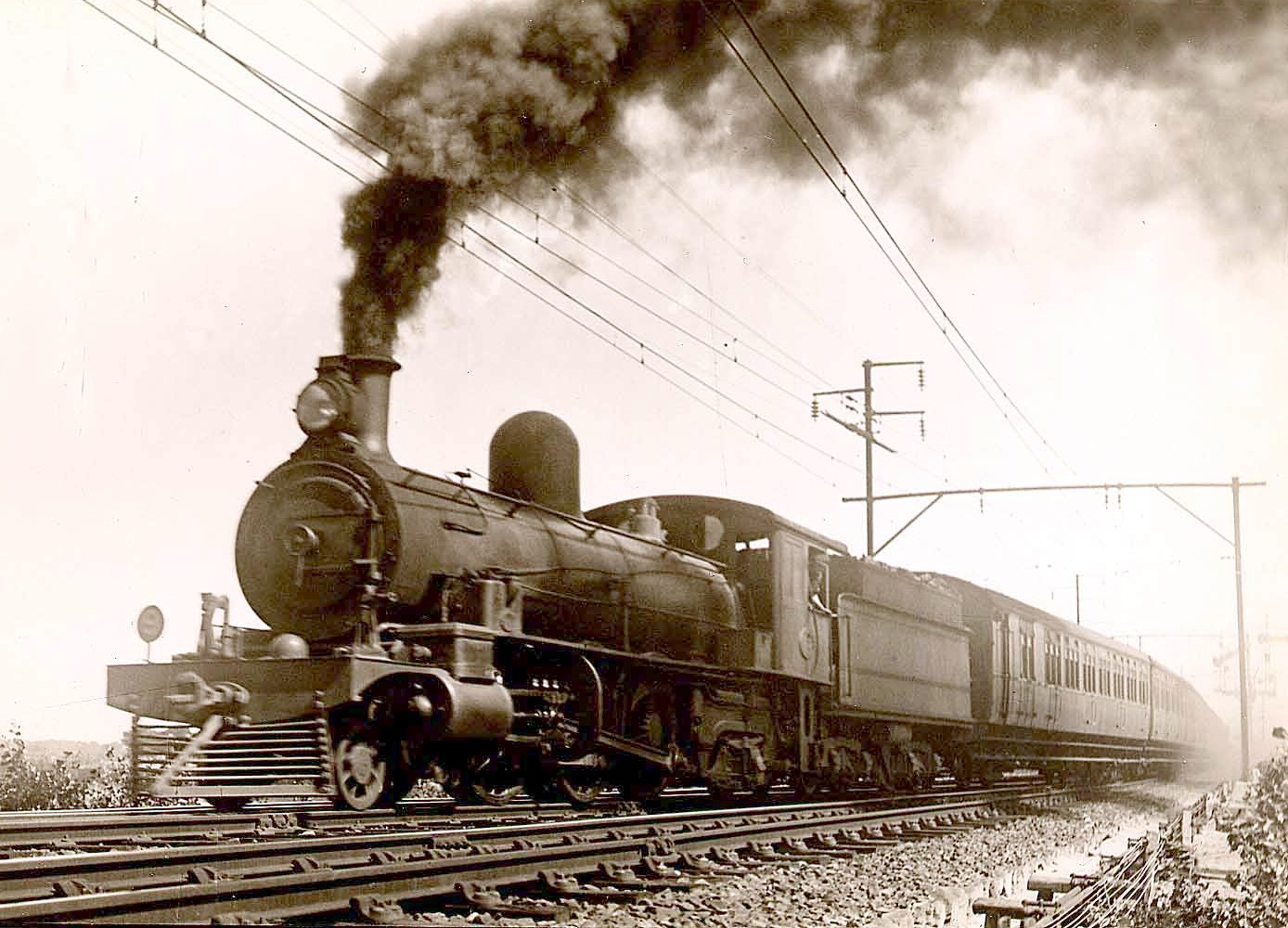
CGR 6th Class, SAR Class 6Y

The first four Prairie locomotives built for the Cape Government Railways (CGR) by Neilson, Reid and Company, later designated Class 6Z on the South African Railways (SAR), were placed in service in 1901, but they displayed the Prairie's tendency to be unsteady at speed. They were therefore soon modified to a 2-6-4 Adriatic wheel arrangement.

With an improved design of bissel truck, two more CGR locomotives which were ordered from Kitson and Company in 1903 were once again built with a 2-6-2 Prairie wheel arrangement. These two locomotives did not display the tendency to sway at speed and therefore retained their 2-6-2 wheel arrangement. In 1912, when they were assimilated into the SAR, they were renumbered and designated Class 6Y.

=== Switzerland ===
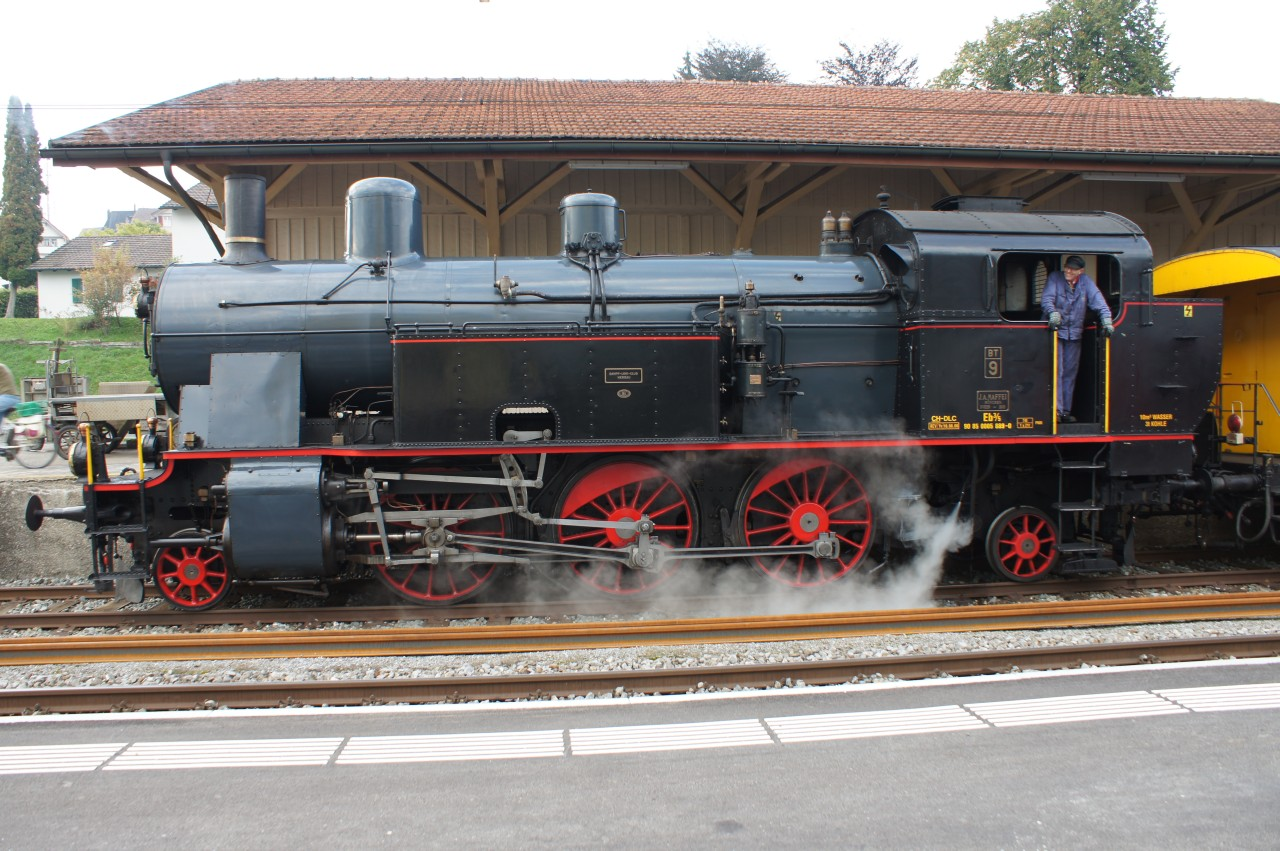
Tank locomotive BT Eb 3/5 no. 9 of the Dampf-Loki-Club Herisau

Switzerland had four classes of 2-6-2 tank locomotives.

- The first was the Bodensee–Toggenburg-Bahn (BT) class Eb 3/5 (speed limit 75 km/h), of which nine were built in 1910 by Maffei, numbered 1 to 9. Seven were scrapped, no. 6 has been plinthed as a monument in Degersheim and no. 9, the only one with red trim, was preserved by the Dampf-Loki-Club Herisau in Bauma. By 2015, the Club del San Gottardo in Mendrisio began to restore them to working order.
- The second was the Swiss Federal Railways (SBB) class Eb 3/5 (speed limit 75 km/h), of which 34 were built from 1911 to 1916 by Swiss Locomotive and Machine Works (SLM), numbered 5801 to 5834. Of these, 31 were scrapped, no. 5810 was preserved by the Verein Dampfbahn Bern in Konolfingen, no. 5811 stands as a monument in Baden. By 2015, the Dampfgruppe Zürich in Brugg began to restore them to working order. No. 5819 was preserved by the SBB Historic in Brugg.

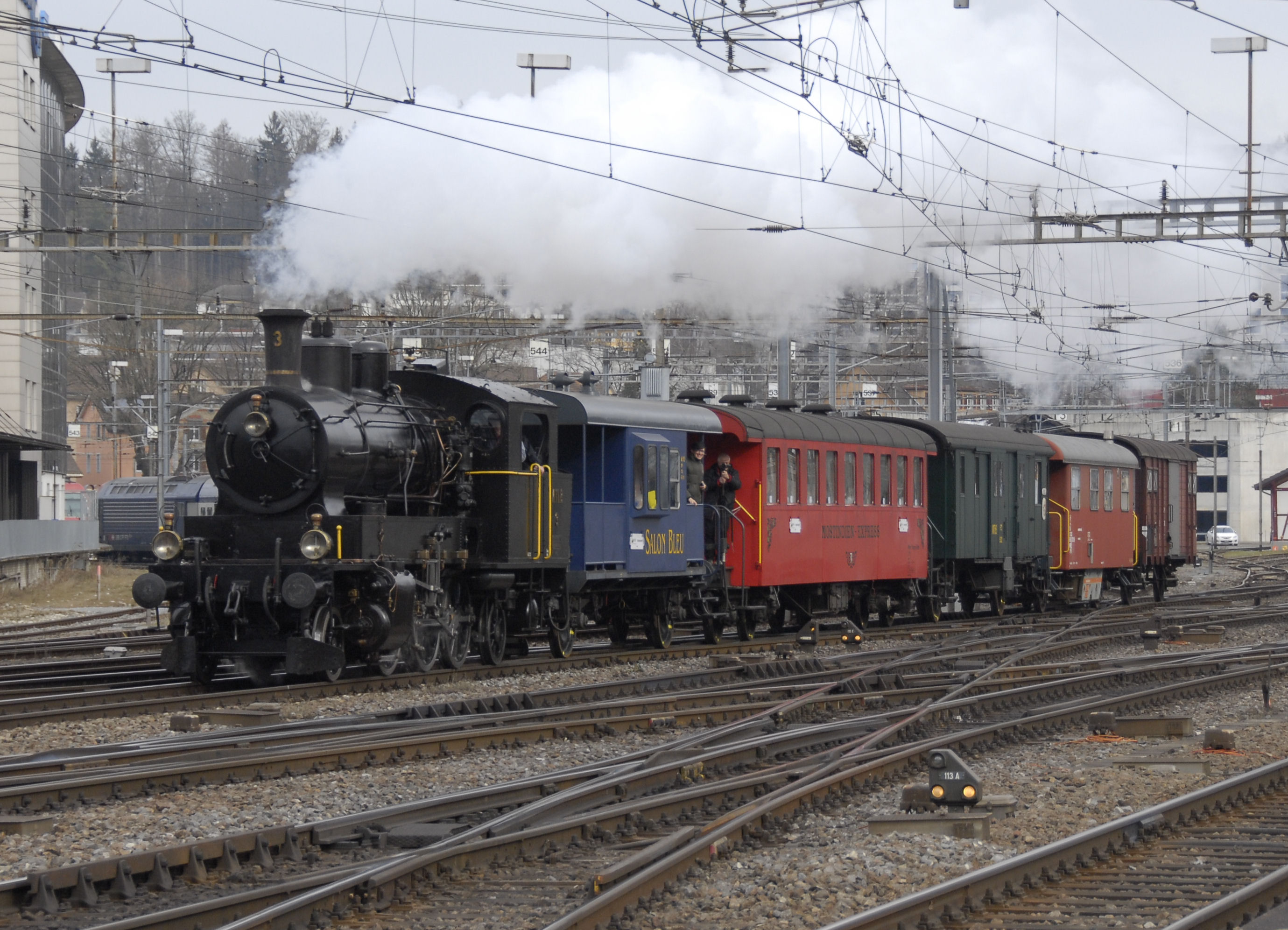
Mostindien-Express with tank locomotive Ec 3/5 no. 3 of the Verein Historische Mittel-Thurgau-Bahn

- The third was the class Ec 3/5 (speed limit 65 km/h) of the Lake Thun railway (TSB) and other railways of the Bern–Lötschberg–Simplon railway group (BLS). Six engines were built by SLM from 1905 to 1907, numbered 41 to 46. After electrification of the tracks in 1921/22, all six were sold to the Austrian Federal Railways and renumbered as class 130.
- The fourth was the Mittelthurgau-Bahn (MThB) class Ec 3/5 (speed limit 60 km/h), of which four were built in 1912 by SLM, numbered 1 to 4. Three were scrapped and no. 3 was preserved by the Verein Historische Mittel-Thurgau-Bahn in Romanshorn. It occasionally pulls the so-called Mostindien-Express.

In 1997, the MThB no. 3 was used as the prototype for the locomotive in the animated 20th Century Fox motion picture Anastasia, where it was given the appearance of a Soviet Union continental locomotive numbered 2747.

=== United Kingdom ===
==== Standard gauge ====
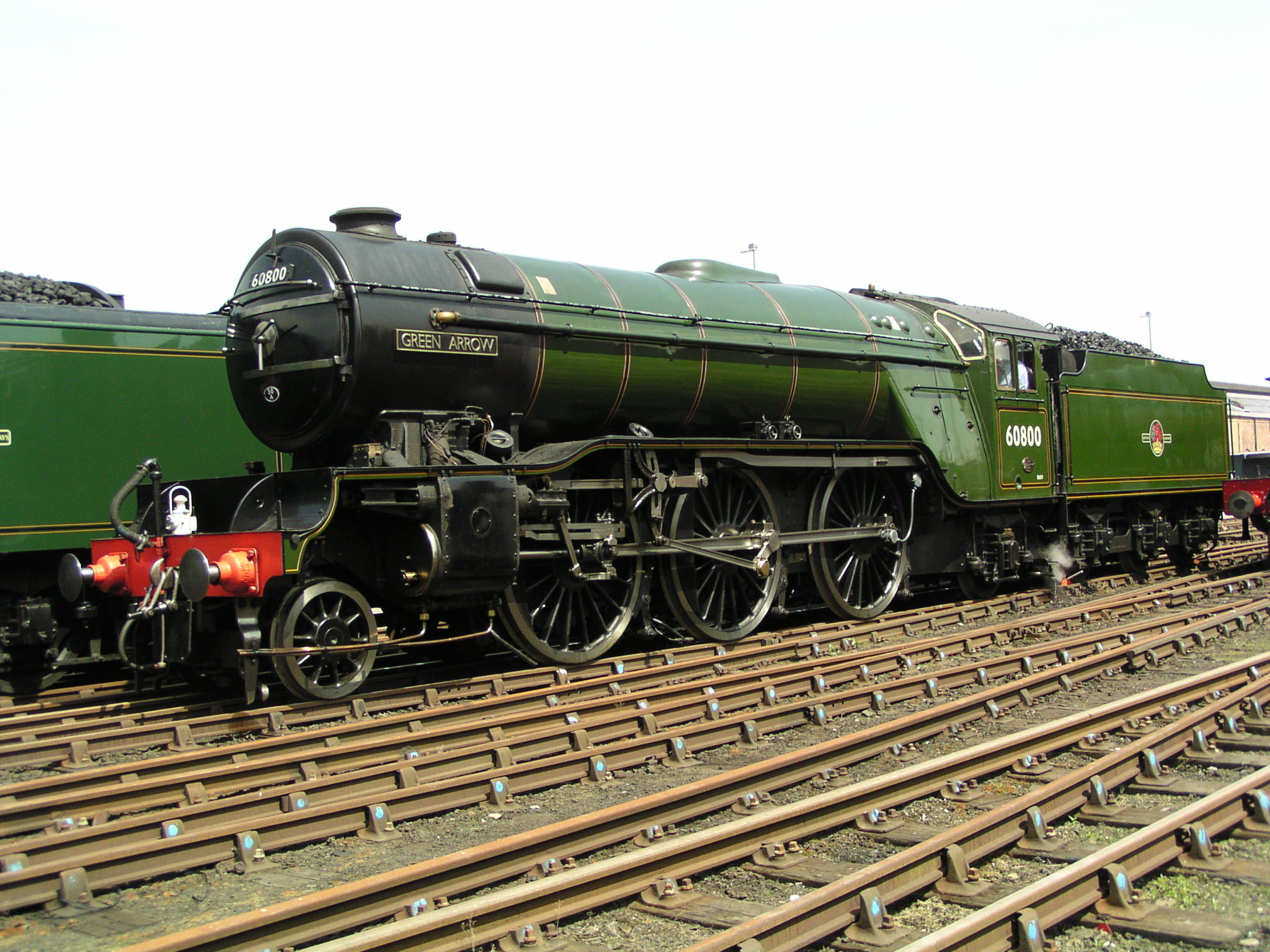
London and North Eastern Railway V2 class 60800 Green Arrow

The first United Kingdom 2-6-2 tender locomotive was the unsuccessful prototype Midland Railway Paget locomotive of 1908. Thereafter, the wheel arrangement was rare on tender locomotives, with the exception of two classes on the London and North Eastern Railway. These were the Class V2 and Class V4 mixed traffic locomotives which totalled 186 locomotives between them.

In contrast, 2-6-2T locomotives were very widely used on suburban passenger services, particularly by the Great Western Railway (GWR), who built four main classes between 1903 and 1947. These include the 'Large Prairies' (5100, 3150 and 6100 classes), the 'Small Prairies' (4400, 4500 and 4575 classes) and the non-standard 3901 class rebuilt from 0-6-0 tender engines.

The Railway Operating Division received 70 2-6-2 saddle tank engines built by Baldwin Locomotive Works in the United States. They were shipped to France and used near the front line. These engines, nicknamed "tortoises" were probably inspired by the saddle tanks used on forest railways in the USA; they had very small drivers and could run tight curves. After the war, all remaining engines (63) were sold to the Belgian State Railways. The rest was probably destroyed during the war and some of them may have been cannibalised for spares.

Sir Henry Fowler of the London, Midland and Scottish Railway (LMS) introduced a successful 2-6-2T class in 1930, which became the basis of further similar classes by Stanier in 1935 and Ivatt in 1946.

Sir Nigel Gresley of the London and North Eastern Railway (LNER) introduced his V1 and V3 classes in 1930.

The last new 2-6-2T locomotives in Britain were the BR Standard Class 2 2-6-2T, built between 1953 and 1957. The design derived from the earlier LMS Ivatt Class 2 2-6-2T.

==== Narrow gauge ====
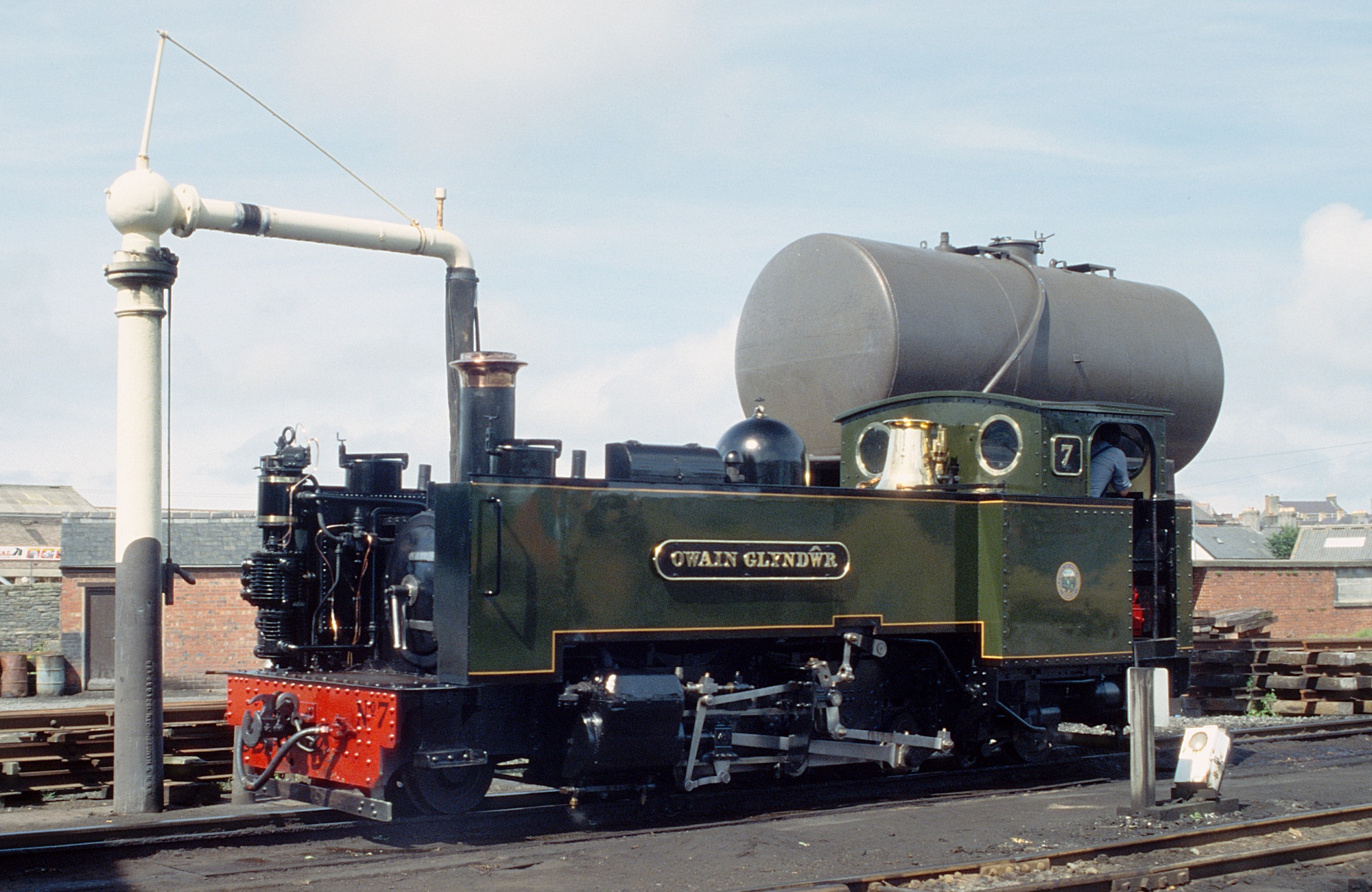
Vale of Rheidol Railway 2-6-2T No. 7 Owain Glyndŵr at Aberystwyth

The 2-6-2T layout was popular for large narrow gauge engines, but the design was modified to allow the use of a firebox much wider than the track gauge. A standard gauge 2-6-2T normally has inside frames and the firebox is placed between the second and third coupled axles. A narrow gauge one, on the other hand, has outside frames and the firebox is placed behind the third coupled axle and clear of the wheels. To minimise the rear overhang, the fuel is therefore carried in side-bunkers alongside the firebox, instead of in a rear bunker.

Preserved examples include the Welsh Highland Railway's Russell and the Vale of Rheidol Railway locomotives.

=== United States ===
==== Narrow gauge ====
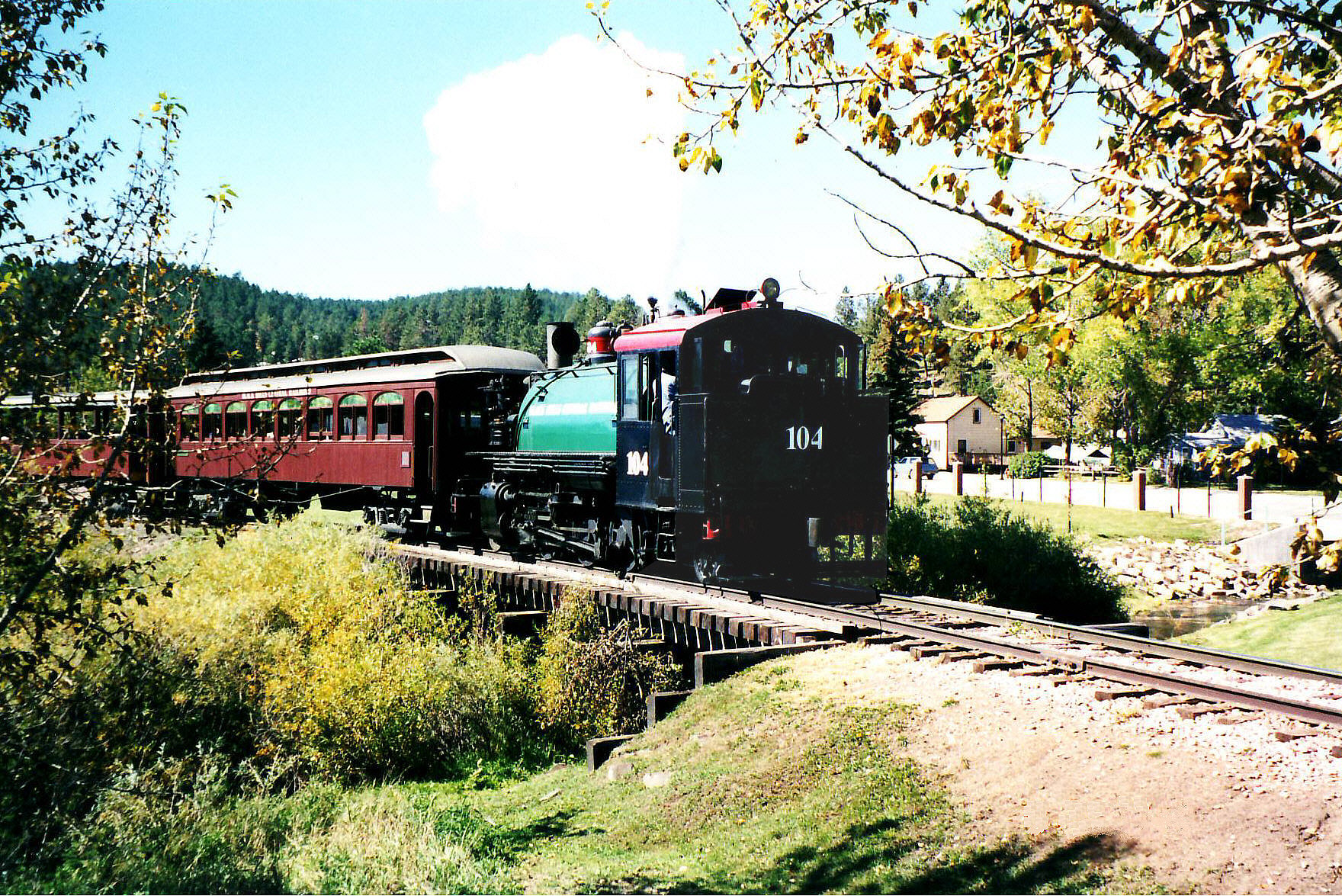
Baldwin 2-6-2ST no. 104 steaming out of Hill City, South Dakota, on the Black Hills Central Railroad in 2001

The 2 ft (610 mm) gauge Sandy River and Rangeley Lakes Railroad in Franklin County, Maine, was a major narrow gauge 2-6-2 user.

==== Standard gauge ====
In the United States, the type evolved from the 2-6-0 (Mogul) configuration. The Atchison, Topeka and Santa Fe Railway (AT&SF) became a pioneer of the type in the United States in 1901 and one of the largest fleet users of the type. Problems the road encountered with the type included steam leakage in the compound cylinder plumbing and instability at speed. The former problem was solved by converting them to simplex two-cylinder locomotives; the latter problem required new 4-6-2 (Pacific) types with four-wheeled guide trucks. The Prairie types were rebuilt with smaller drivers for slightly slower fast freight service. These engines tended to enjoy very long service lives and outlasted many newer, more efficient steam locomotives on the Santa Fe and elsewhere. This was due to their modest weight, good speed and ability to operate well in reverse, which made them valuable for branch line operations.

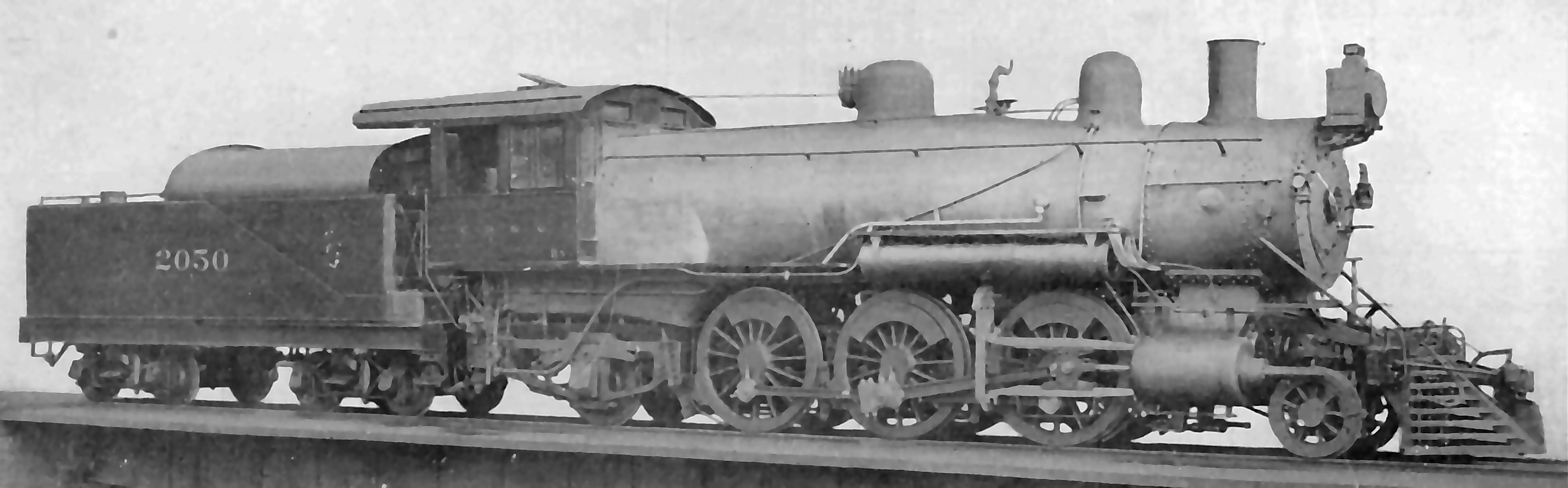
A Prairie type built for the Burlington by Baldwin

In 1902, the AT&SF had a 2-6-2 with a high, at the time, boiler pressure of 220 pounds per square inch (1,517 kilopascals), mounted on a large 41-square-foot (3.8-square-meter) fire grate.

More than a thousand examples of the 2-6-2 wheel arrangement existed in the United States. Of these, one hundred were high-wheeled engines with larger than 69-inch (1,753-millimeter) drivers. The Lake Shore & Michigan Southern operated locomotives with 80-inch (2,032-millimeter) drivers, but this did not overcome their inherent instability. They were never as successful in passenger service in the U.S. as they were in other nations.
