= Belgian State Railways Type 4 =

Class of 91 Belgian 2-6-2T locomotives

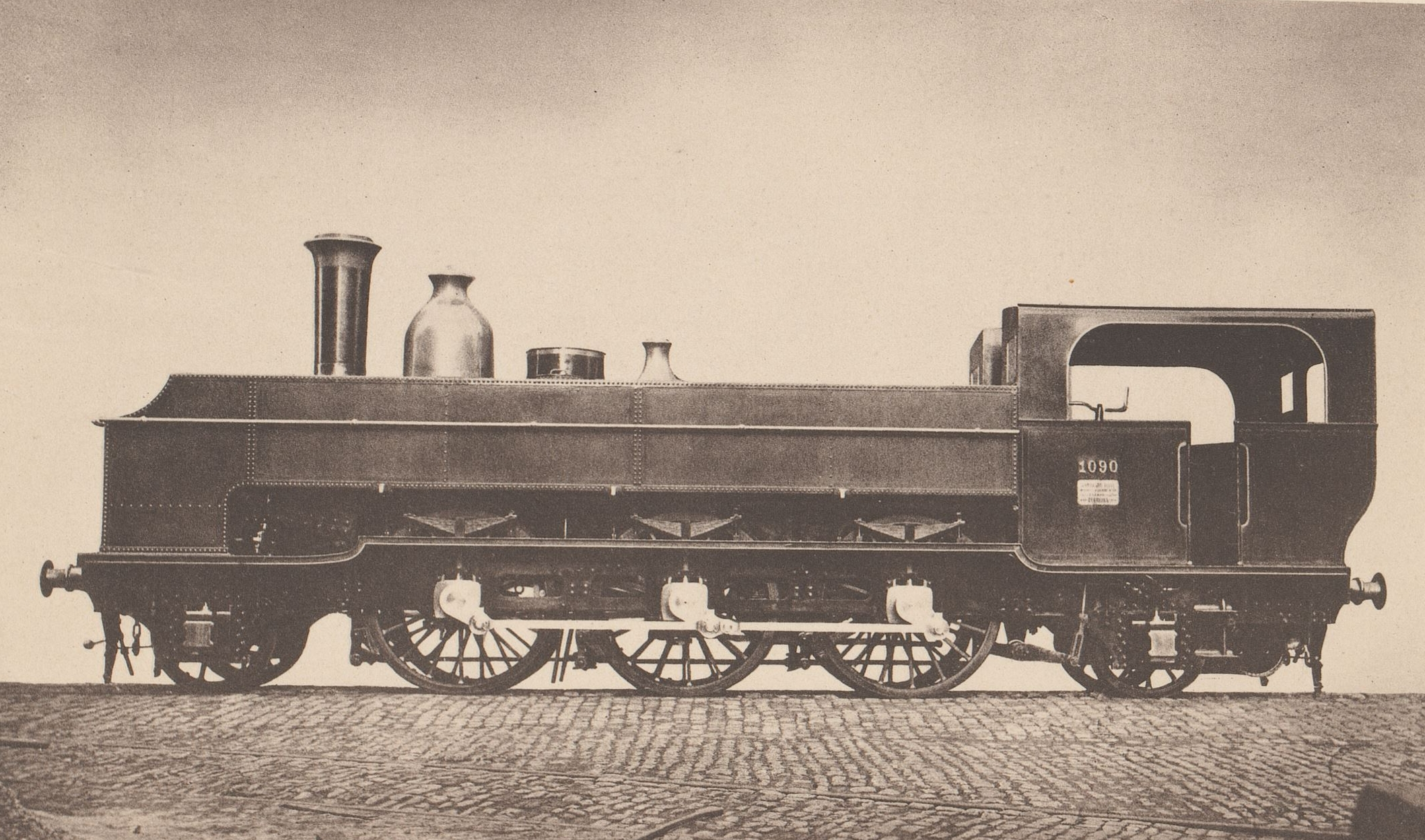
Type and origin
- Power type: Steam
- Builder: Evrard (25), Tubize (23), Haine-Saint-Pierre (23), Carels (12), Cockerill (8)
- Build date: 1878–1881
- Total produced: 91
Specifications
- Configuration
  - Whyte: 2-6-2T
  - UIC: 1′C1′ n2t
- Gauge: 1,435 mm (4 ft 8 1/2 in) standard gauge
- Driver dia.: 1,700 mm (66.93 in)
- Wheelbase: 8.40 m (27 ft 6 3/4 in)
- Length: 12.03 m (39 ft 5 1/2 in)
- Axle load: 13.30 t (13.09 long tons; 14.66 short tons)
  - Leading: 10.55 t (10.38 long tons; 11.63 short tons)
  - 1st coupled: 12.30 t (12.11 long tons; 13.56 short tons)
  - 2nd coupled: 13.30 t (13.09 long tons; 14.66 short tons)
  - 3rd coupled: 12.20 t (12.01 long tons; 13.45 short tons)
  - Trailing: 10.60 t (10.43 long tons; 11.68 short tons)
- Loco weight: 58.95 t (58.02 long tons; 64.98 short tons)
- Fuel capacity: 1,700 kg (3,750 lb)
- Water cap.: 9,794 L (2,150 imp gal; 2,590 US gal)
- Firebox
  - Type: Belpaire
  - Grate area: 2.7667 m^{2} (29.781 sq ft)
- Boiler pressure: 8 atm (0.811 MPa; 118 psi)
- Heating surface: 109.383 m^{2} (1,177.39 sq ft)
- Cylinders: Two, inside
- Cylinder size: 450 mm × 600 mm (17.72 in × 23.62 in)
- Valve gear: Stephenson
Performance figures
- Tractive effort: 3,839 kg (8,464 lb)
Career
- Operators: Belgian State Railways
- Class: Type 4

The Belgian State Railways Type 4 was a class of 2-6-2T steam locomotives for passenger traffic, introduced in 1878.

== Construction history ==
The locomotives were built by various manufacturers from 1878 to 1881. The machines had an outside frame and inside cylinders and a Stephenson valve gear.

Known production quantities
Manufacturer	Serial numbers	Quantity	Date in service	État Belge Numbers
Charles Evrard	292–295, 302–306	9	1878–1879	EB 1087–1095
Tubize	355–358	4	1879	EB 1096–1099
Haine-Saint-Pierre	124–128	5	1879	EB 1100–1104
Cockerill	1076–1083	8	1879	EB 1105–1112
Tubize	362–366	5	1879–1880	EB 1172–1176
Charles Evrard	307–308, 310, 309, 313	5	1879–1880	EB 1177–1181
Carels Frères	105–109	5	1879–1880	EB 1182–1186
Haine-Saint-Pierre	129–133	5	1879–1880	EB 1187–1191
Carels Frères	110–111	2	1880	EB 1192–1194
Tubize	387, 408	2	1880	EB 1195–1196
Charles Evrard	317–318	2	1880	EB 1197–1198
Haine-Saint-Pierre	134–135	2	1880	EB 1199–1200
Tubize	431–437	7	1880	EB 1368–1369, 1434–1438
Tubize	450–454	5	1881	EB 1457–1461
Charles Evrard		9		
Haine-Saint-Pierre		11		
Carels Frères		3		
