= List of Remarkable Gardens of France =

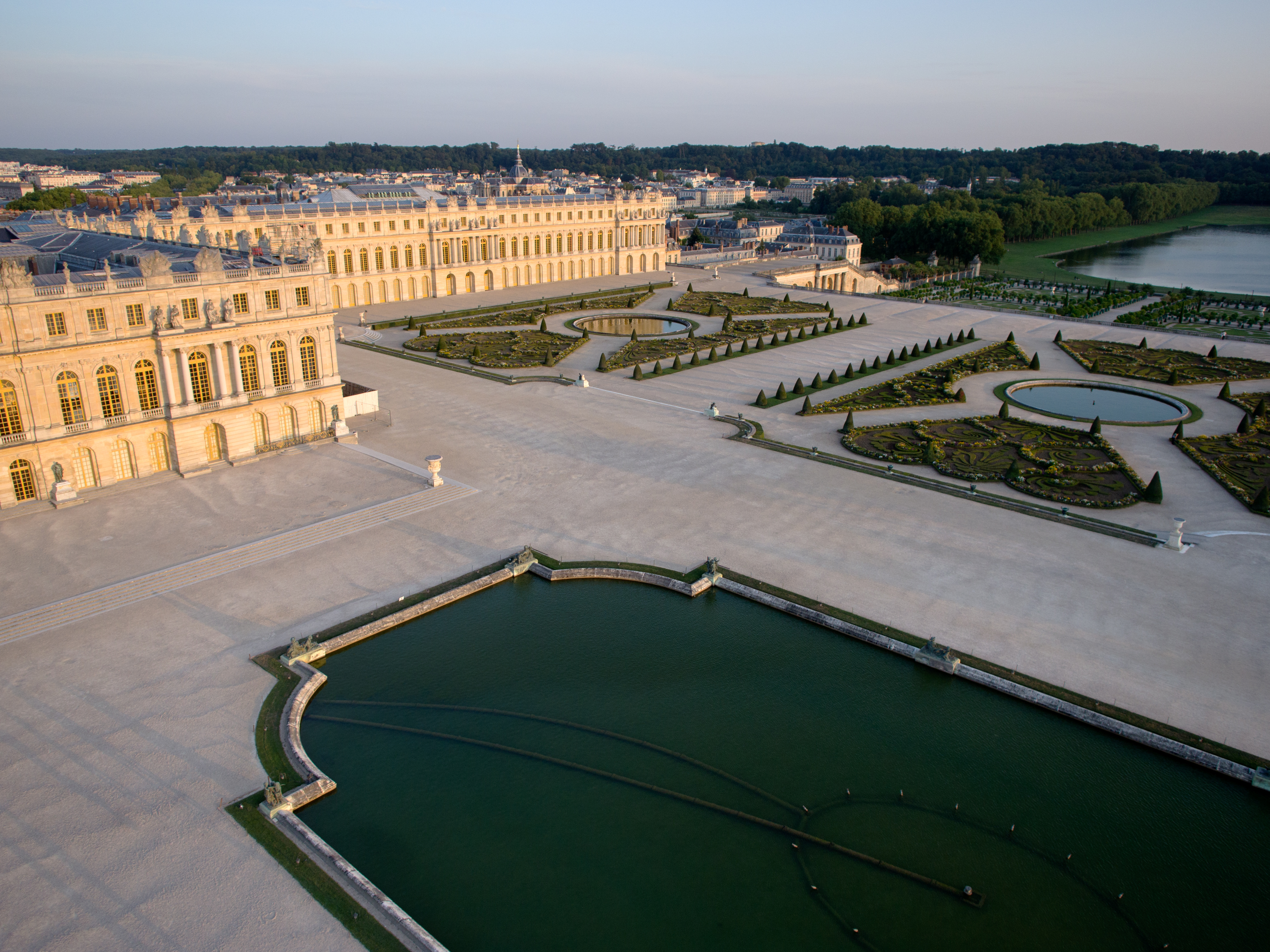
Gardens of the Palace of Versailles, Île-de-France (Parterre du Midi)

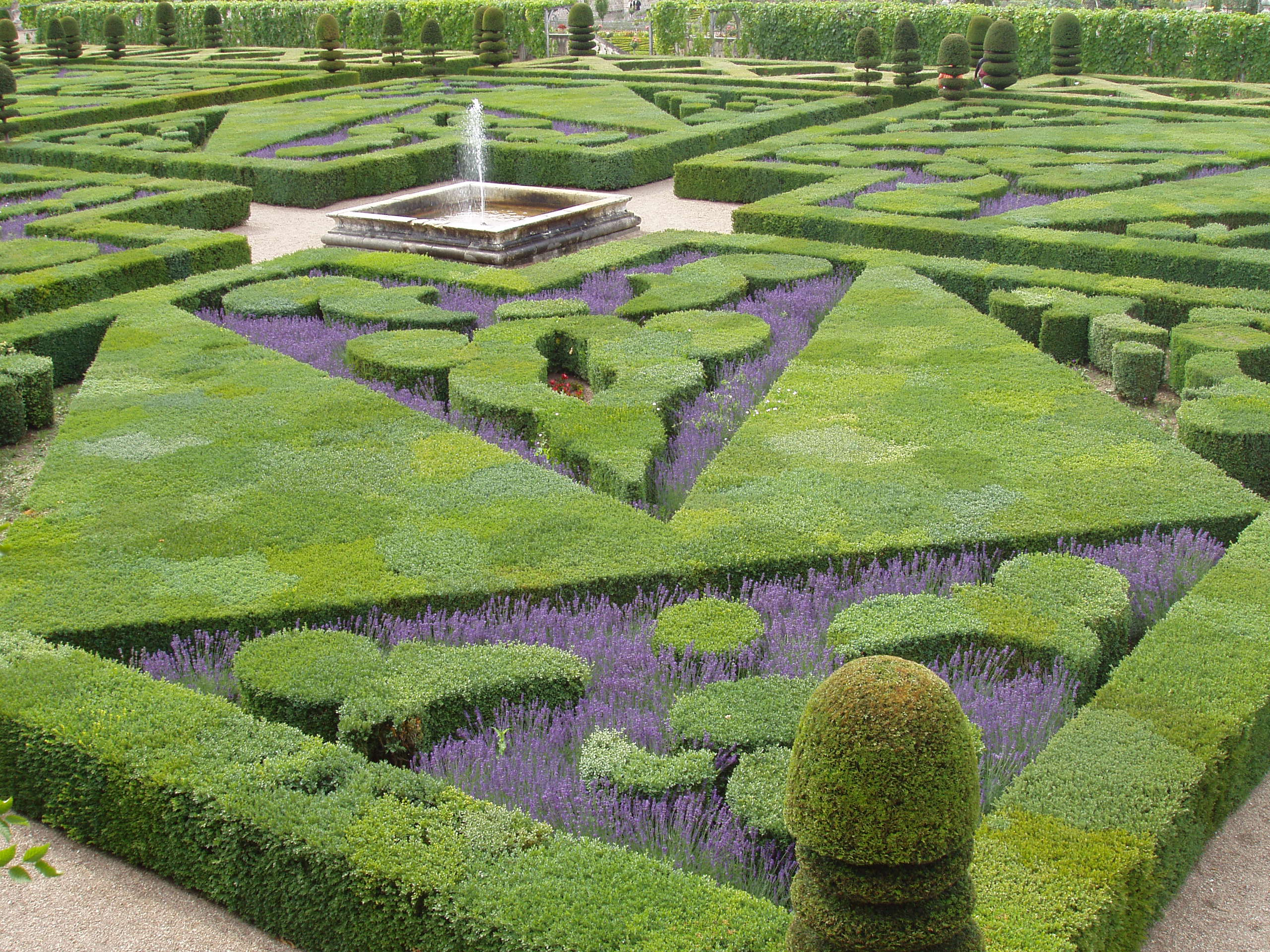
Gardens of the Château de Villandry, Indre-et-Loire (Salon de Musique)

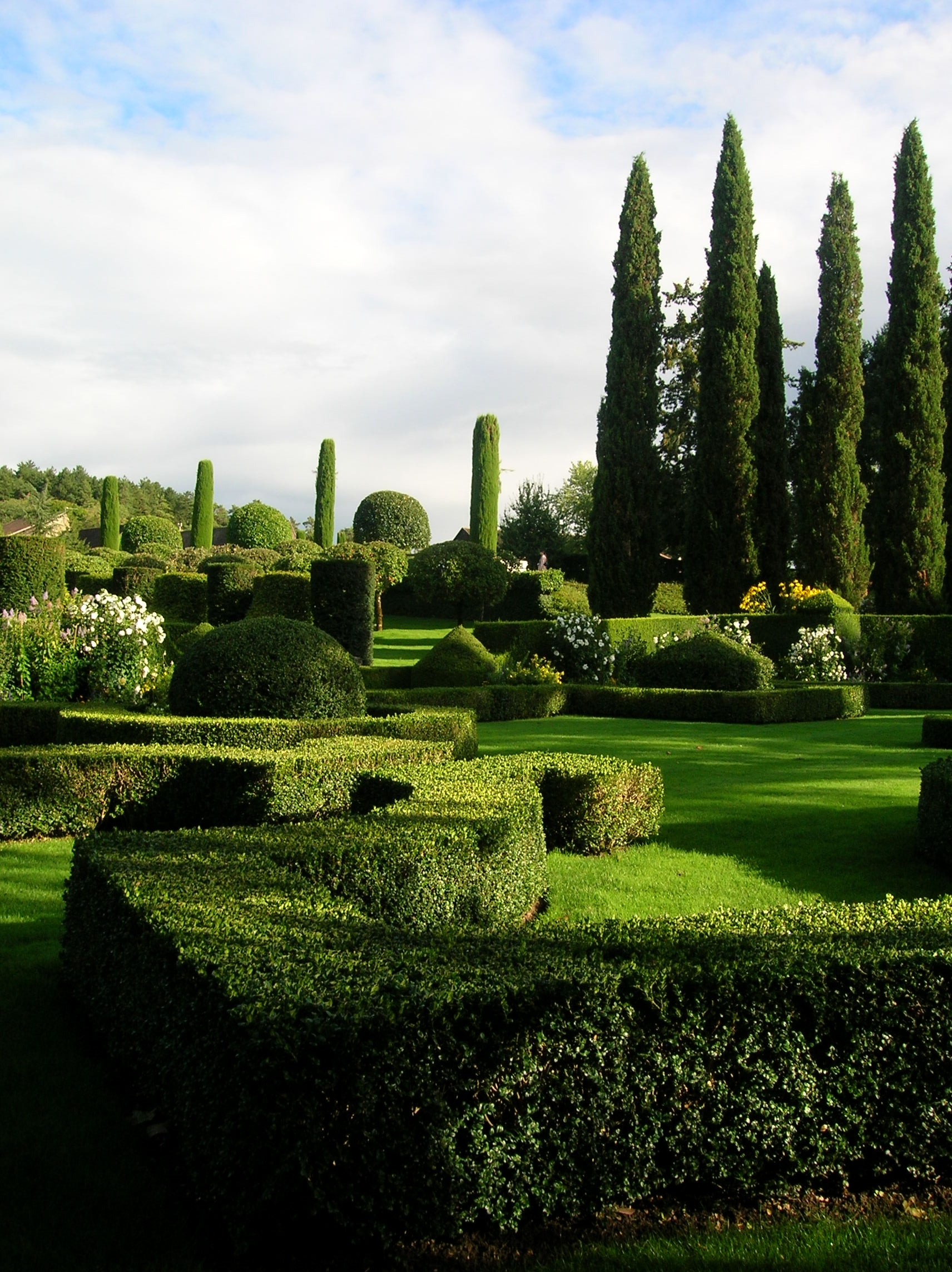
Manoir of Eyrignac, Dordogne

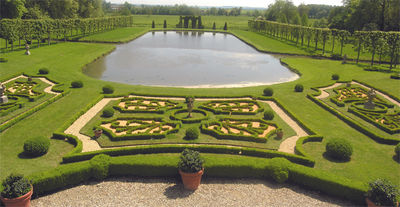
Gardens of the Château de Vendeuvre, Calvados

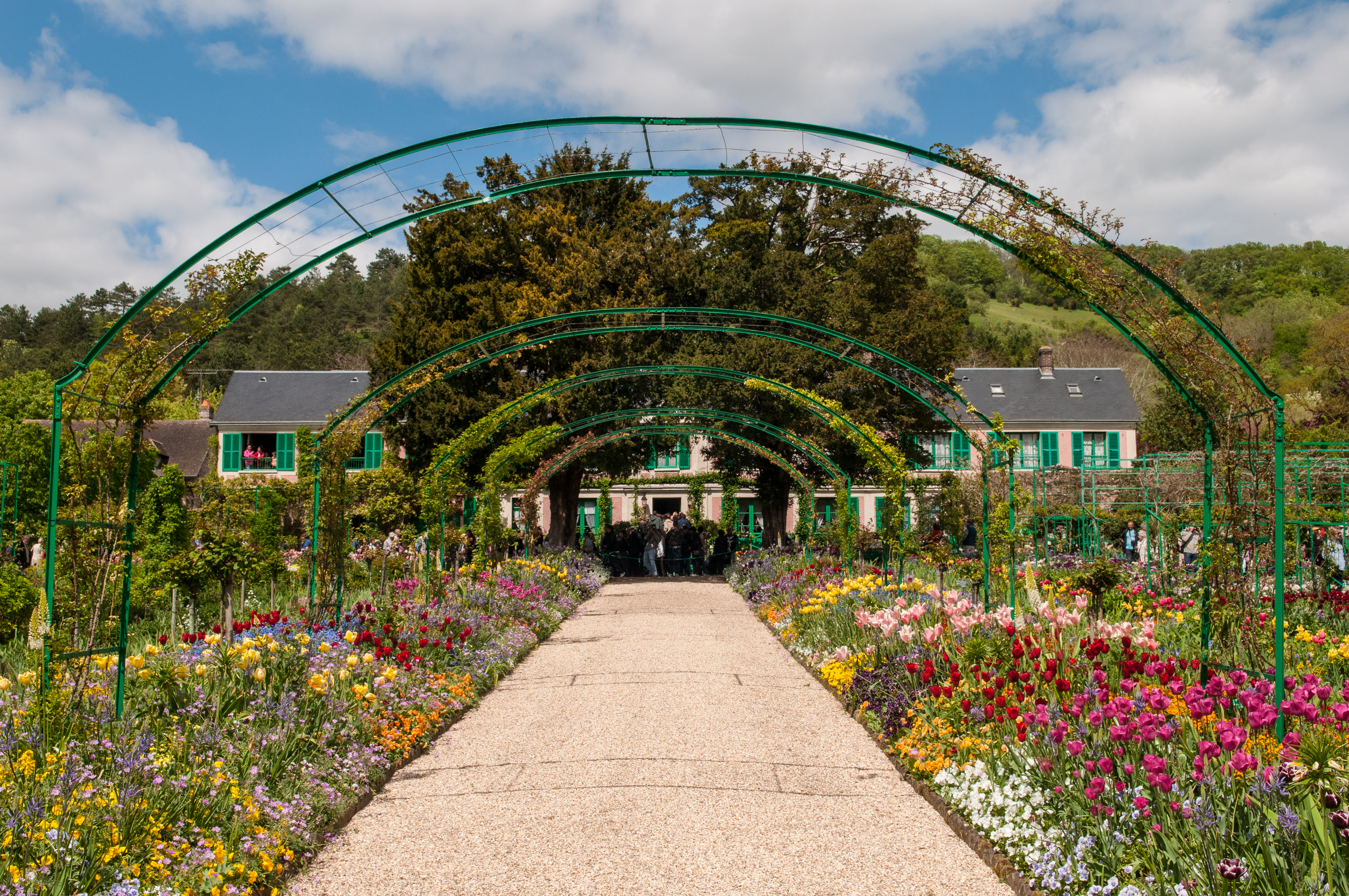
Claude Monet's house and garden in Giverny

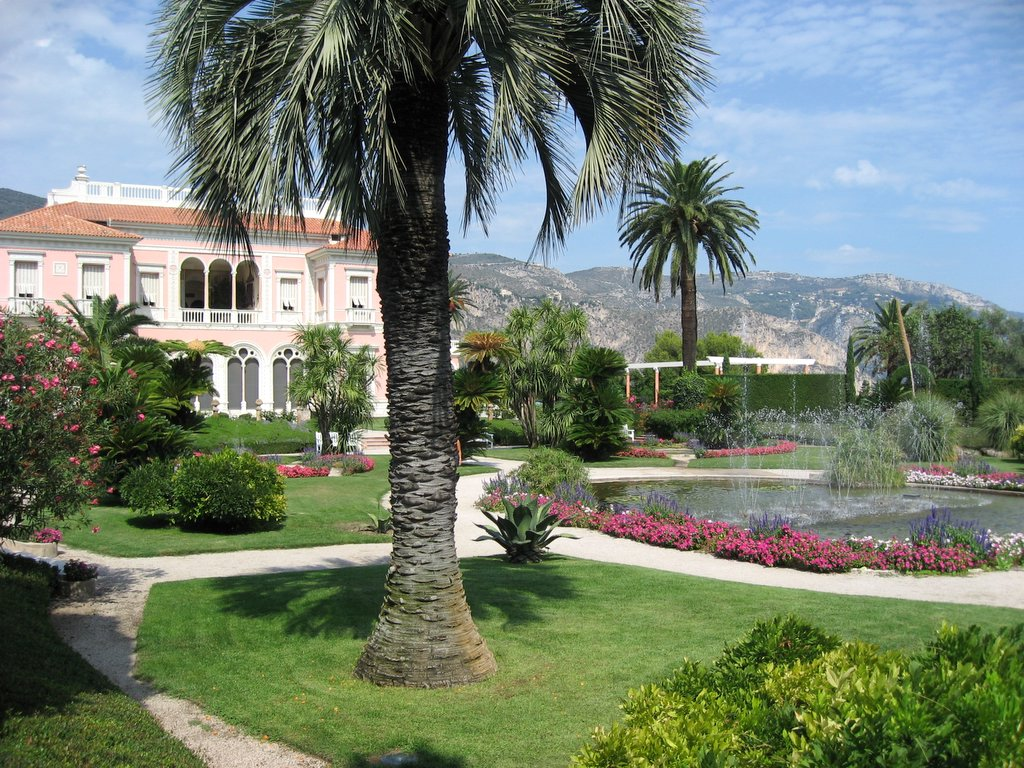
Gardens of the Villa Ephrussi de Rothschild, Alpes-Maritimes

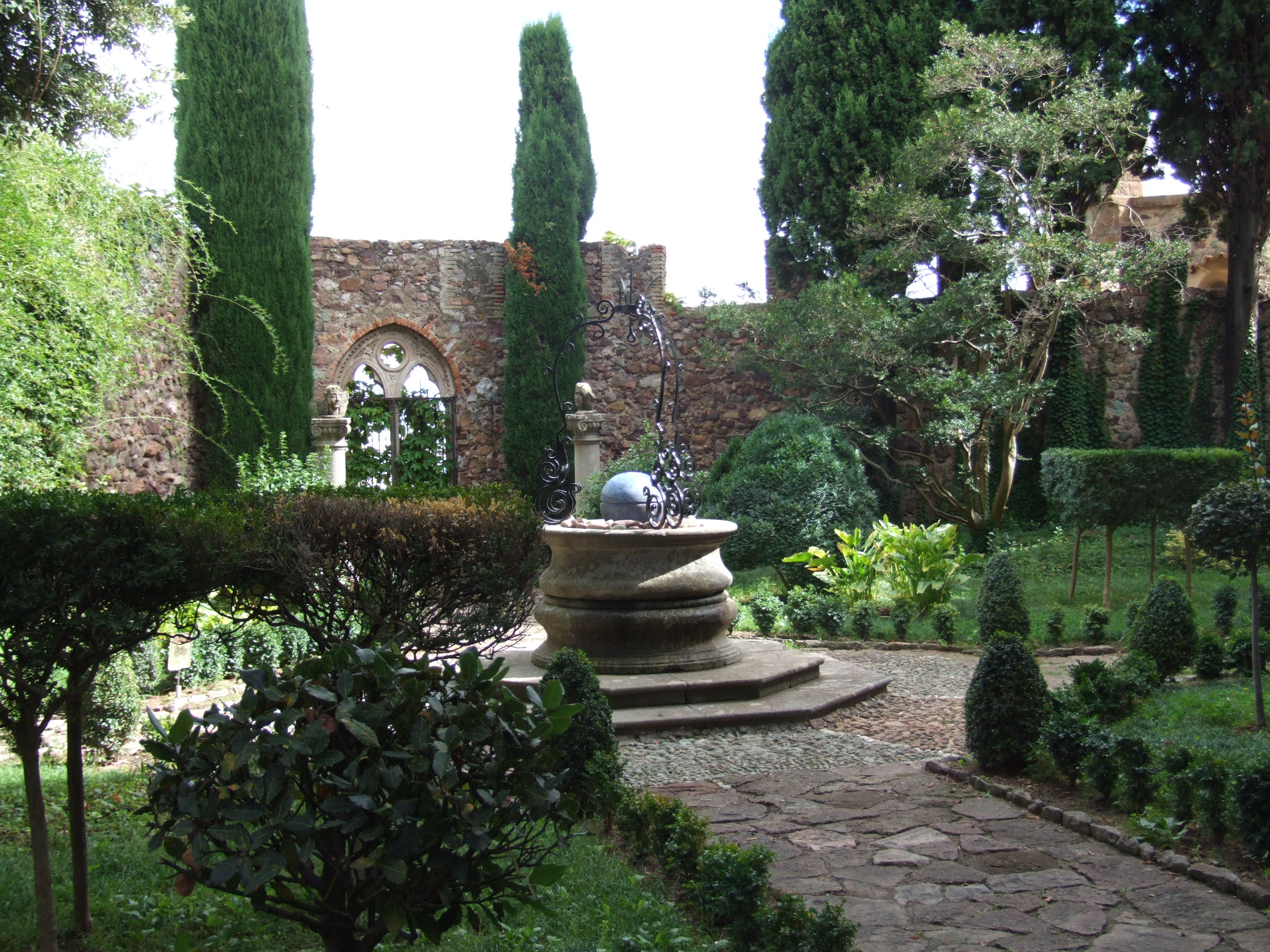
Château de la Napoule, Alpes-Maritimes

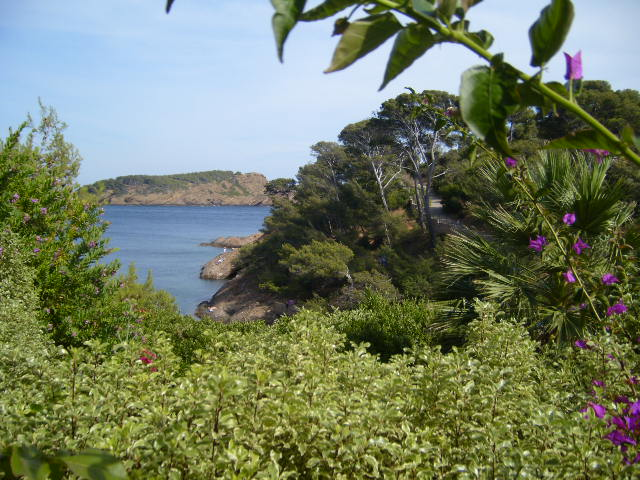
Parc du Mugel, La Ciotat, Bouches-du-Rhône

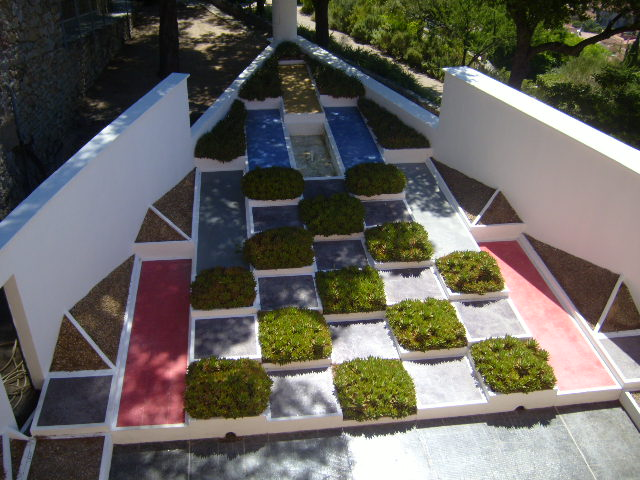
Cubist Garden of the Villa Noailles, Parc Saint-Bernard, Hyères, Var

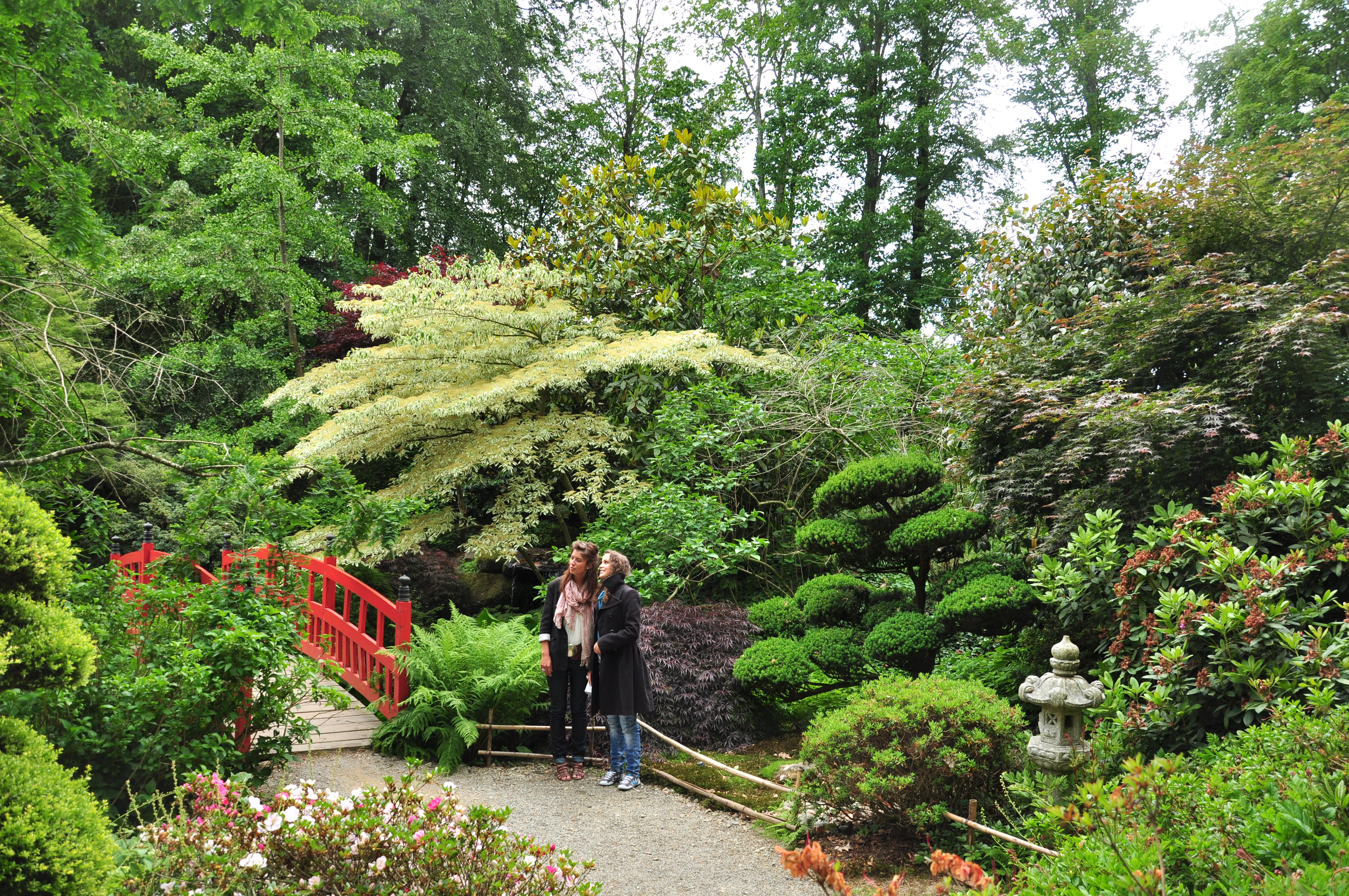
Botanical garden of Upper Brittany

The Remarkable Gardens of France is intended to be a list and description, by region, of the more than three hundred gardens classified as "Jardins remarquables" by the Ministry of Culture and the Comité des Parcs et Jardins de France.

== Gardens of Alsace ==
=== Bas-Rhin ===
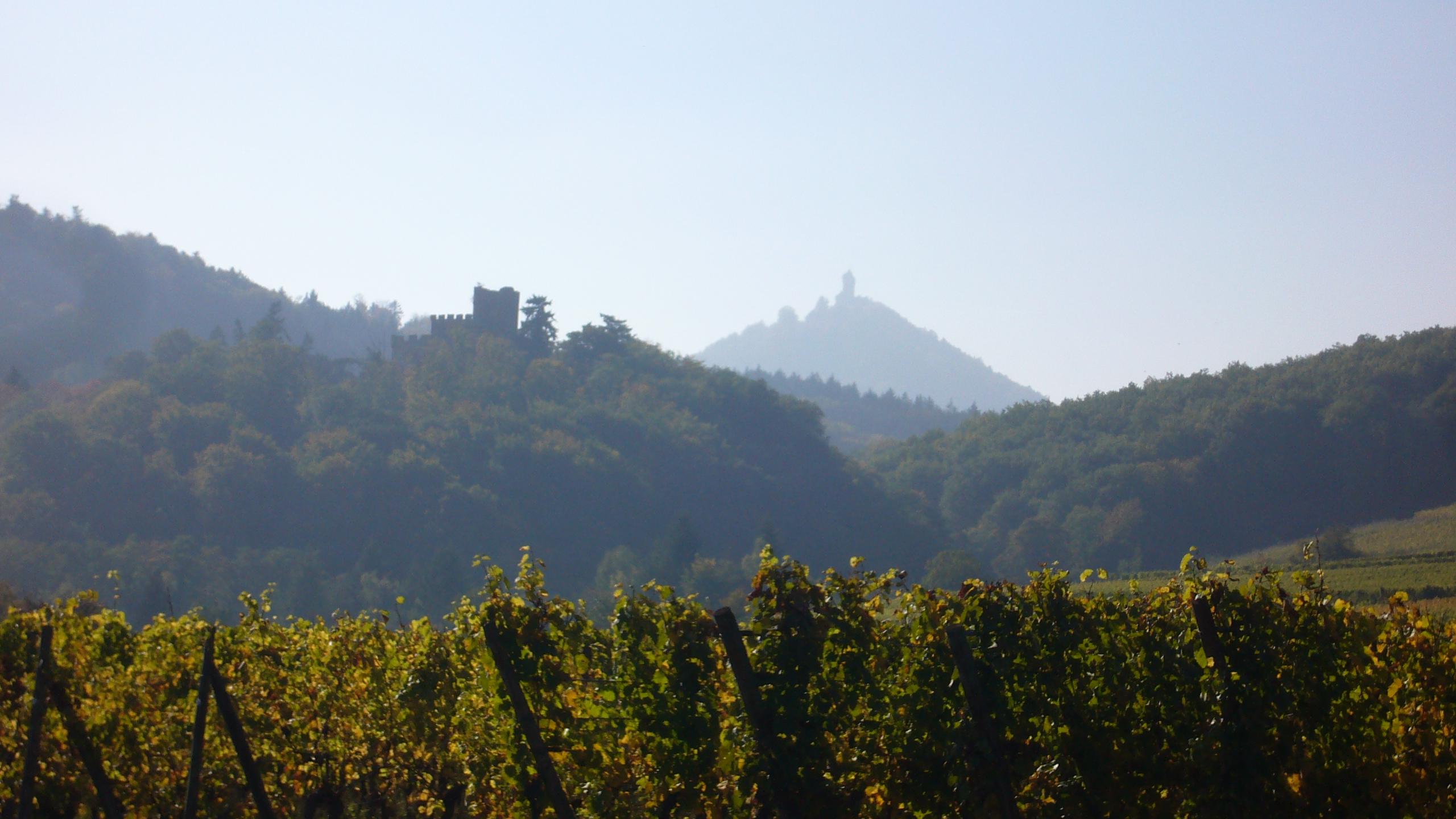
View of the Château de Kintzheim and of Haut-Kœnigsbourg from the road between Châtenois and Kintzheim

- Brumath - Jardin de l'Escalier. (1973) Small private modern romantic floral garden. (See Photos)
- Kintzheim – The Park of Ruins of the Château de Kintzheim. An early 19th-century romantic landscape garden. (See photos)
- Kolbsheim – The Garden of the Château de Kolbsheim. (1703) French garden and English landscape park. (See photos)
- Ottrott – Le Domaine de Windeck. (1835). Romantic landscape park, with views of the ruined castle of Ottrott. (See photos)
- Plobsheim – Le Jardin de Marguerite. (1990) Small private English "secret" garden in the Alsatian village of Plobsheim. (See photos)
- Saverne – Jardin botanique du col de Saverne. Botanical garden in an enclave in the Vosges Forest. (See Photos)
- Strasbourg – Jardin botanique de l'Université de Strasbourg. Founded in 1619, the second-oldest botanical garden in France. (See photos of the garden)
- Uttenhoffen – Jardin de la Ferme Bleue. Modern garden on the site of a 17th-century farm. (See photos)

=== Haut-Rhin ===
- Guebwiller – Parc de la Marseillaise. Public arboretum and botanical garden, designed by Édouard André between 1897 and 1899. (See photos)
- Husseren-Wesserling – Parc de Wesserling (17 hectares) Private garden at the site of a hunting lodge of the prince-abbey of Murbach (1699). Formal French garden, flower garden, kitchen garden, field garden and contemporary garden. (see photos)
- Mulhouse – Parc Zoologique et Botanique de Mulhouse. (25 hectares) Public botanical gardens and zoo, English landscape park.(See photos)
- Riedisheim – Park Alfred Wallach. Created in 1935 by Paris landscape architect Achille Duchêne; stairways connecting the different parts of the garden; and tree-shaded allées. (See photos)

== Gardens of Aquitaine ==
=== Dordogne ===
- Domme – Park and Boxwood Garden of the Château de Caudon. A garden à la française and French landscape garden, created between 1808 and 1814 by the Marquis Jacques de Malville, one of the authors of the French Civil Code. See pictures

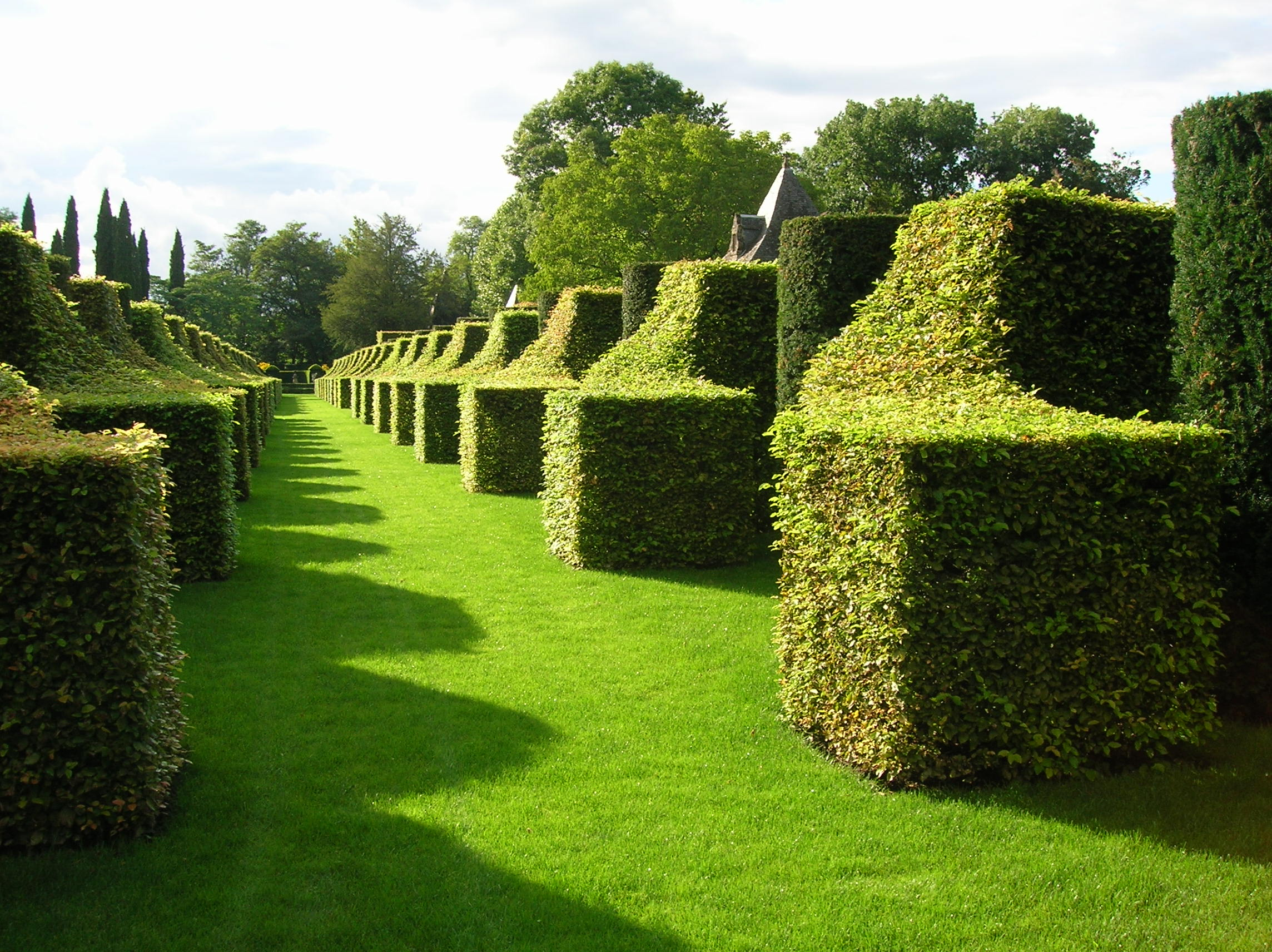
Manoir d'Eyrignac (Dordogne)

- Eymet – Park and Kitchen Garden of Pouthet. A small 18th-century château in the valley of the Dropt River features an avenue of cedar planted in 1860; cyclamen, crocus and jonquil in season; and a garden of vegetables and flowers grouped by color. (See pictures.)
- Hautefort – Gardens of the Château de Hautefort. The château was reconstructed in the 17th century, and embellished with a garden à la française (jardin à la française). In 1853, the gardens were redone by the celebrated landscape architect the Count of Choulot, and the château, gardens and landscape were unified, with geometric flower gardens, topiary gardens imitating the domes of the château, and a long tunnel of greenery. Next to the formal gardens is a hill with an Italian garden with winding shaded paths. Notable trees in the park include a Magnolia grandiflora and a Cedar of Lebanon. (See pictures)
- Le Buisson-de-Cadouin – Garden of Planbuisson. The garden presents two hundred and sixty four different types of bamboo, from dwarf bamboo to giant, as well as exotic trees, such as Paulownia fortunei. The garden is particularly attractive at the end of summer, autumn and winter. (See photos)
- Saint-Cybranet – Gardens of Albarède An unusual modern garden, created by landscape architect Serge Lapouge. The garden features one thousand species adapted to the dry and rigorous climate and poor soil of the region. It presents fruit trees, aromatic plants, a topiary garden, old types of vegetables and roses, as well as examples of the rural architecture of the Périgord region. (see photos)

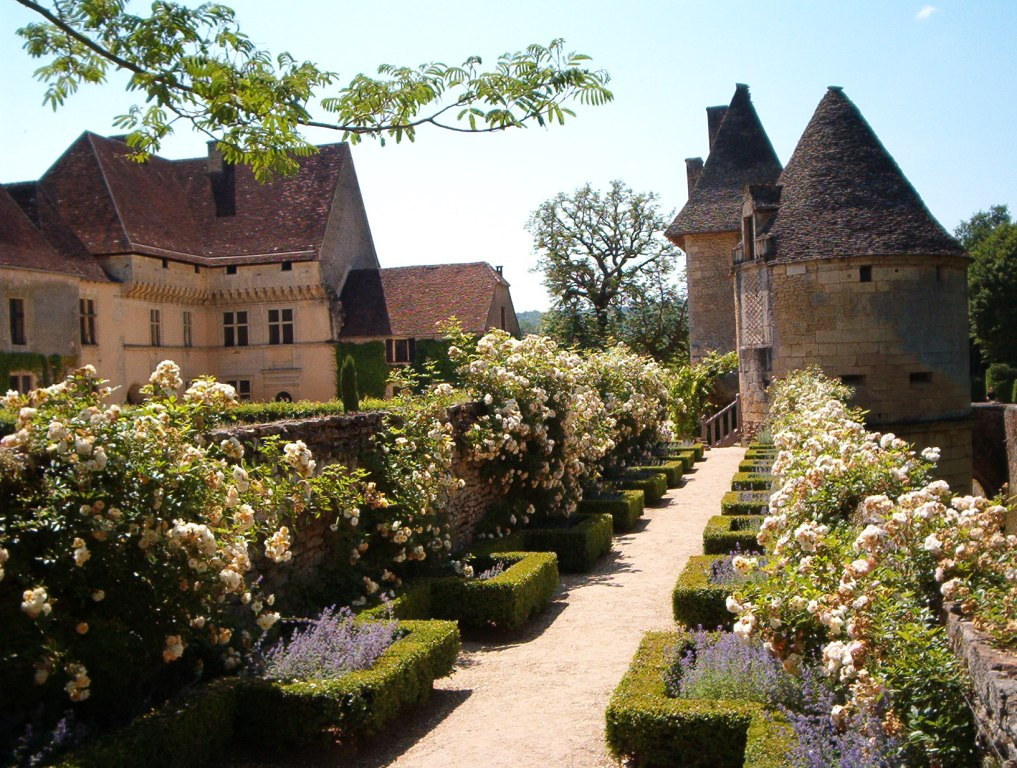
Rose Garden, Château de Losse (Dordogne)

- Saint-Germain-de-Belvès – Garden of Conty. A French hilltop garden in Périgord, inspired by the gardens of Tuscany. The garden features cypress trees from Italy, chestnut, plane trees, walnut and oak, a wide variety of fruit trees, and a medieval kitchen garden. (See Photos)
- Manor d'Eyrignac in Salignac-Eyvigues – A garden à la française and French landscape garden from the 18th century, recreated in the 20th century, surround a 17th-century manor house on a hill, with water coming from seven springs.

(see photos)

- Thonac – Gardens of the Château de Losse. The pleasure garden of a Renaissance château next to the Vézère River, with gardens atop the walls overlooking the river, a tunnel of vines, a fine rose garden, a courtyard with squares planted with lavender, edged with rosemary, and guarded by cypress trees.

(see photos)

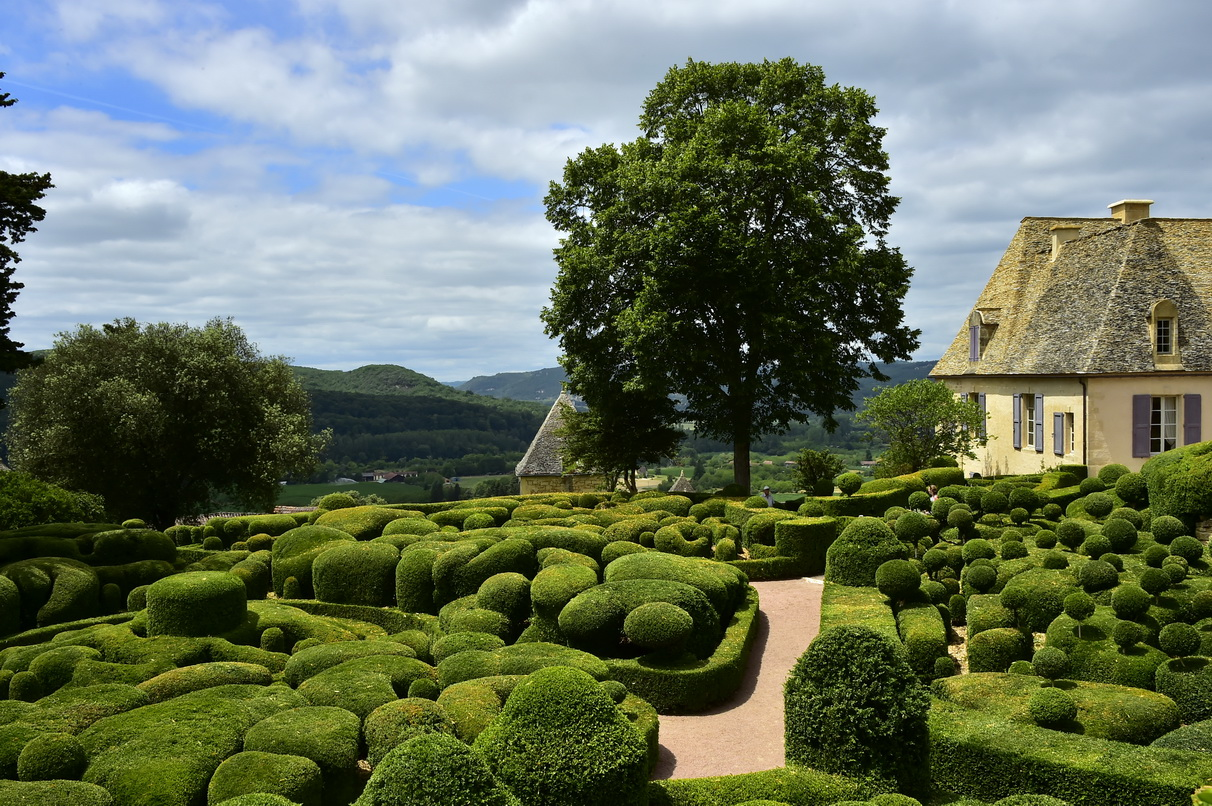
Gardens of Marqueyssac (Dordogne)

- Vézac – Gardens of Marqueyssac. Built in the 17th century by Bertrand Vernet, Counselor to the King. The original garden was created by a pupil of André Le Nôtre, and featured gardens, terraces, and a kitchen garden surrounding the château. A grand promenade one hundred meters long was added at the end of the 18th century. Beginning in 1866, the new owner, Julien de Cerval, who was inspired by Italian gardens, built rustic structures, redesigned the parterres, laid out five kilometers of walks, and planted pines and cypress trees. (See Photos)
- Terrasson-Lavilledieu – Gardens of the Imagination (fr: Jardins de l'Imaginaire). This contemporary garden, a public park of the town of Terrasson, was designed in 1996 by landscape architect Kathryn Gustafson to present thirteen tableaux of the myths and legends of the history of gardens. It uses simple natural elements; trees, flowers, water and stone to suggest the passage of mankind from nature to agriculture to the city. It uses a symbolic sacred wood, a rose garden, topiary art, and fountains to tell the story. (See Pictures)
- Vélines – Gardens of Sardy. A small garden from the 1950s built around a country house, with a shaded terrace for tea, and intimate landscapes and views inspired by English and Italian gardens.
- Issac – Gardens of the Château de Montréal. The château was built in 1535, in the Renaissance style, on the site of a fortress dating to the 13th and 14th centuries. The gardens were built upon the ramparts of the fortress at the beginning of the 20th century by Achille Duchêne. The lower garden is in the Italian style, and features hibiscus and yew trees, and walls covered with white roses and white clematis. The upper garden is a jardin à la française, with ornamental flower beds and a topiary garden. The garden was badly damaged by a storm in 1999, and has been replanted.(see pictures)
- Urval – Gardens of la Bourlie. Originating as the gardens of the château of a noble family of Périgord in the 14th century, the original 17th-century gardens featured a kitchen garden and an early French ornamental garden surrounded by a wall. Later, in the 18th century, a grand axis between the village and the woods was created, along with an alley of linden trees, and a topiary allée of yew trees. In the 19th century a French landscape garden was added, with coniferous trees and varied plants. The château also has fine collection of old roses and fruit trees.

=== Gironde ===
- Cussac-Fort-Médoc – Park of the Château Lanessan. The garden is surrounded by the vineyards of the château, in the Médoc wine region of Bordeaux. The château and gardens were built in 1878 by the architect Duphot. The gardens are in the English style, with avenues, lawns, and cedar, cypress and plane trees.(see photos)
- Portets – Gardens of the Château de Mongénan. The château was built in 1736 and the botanical gardens created in 1741 by the Baron de Gasq, inspired by his friend and music teacher Jean-Jacques Rousseau and the theories of the botanist Linnaeus, who believed that all plants were valuable, whether they were ornamental, medicinal, wild, or for food. The garden was made to resemble the ideal pre-romantic garden Rousseau described in La Nouvelle Héloïse, full of aromas and colors. The current garden is kept as it was in the 18th century, with vegetables of the era, local varieties of fruit trees, 18th-century varieties of roses, asters, irises, dahlias, aromatic plants, and plants used to make perfume. The tuberoses and jasmine fill the gardens with their aromas.

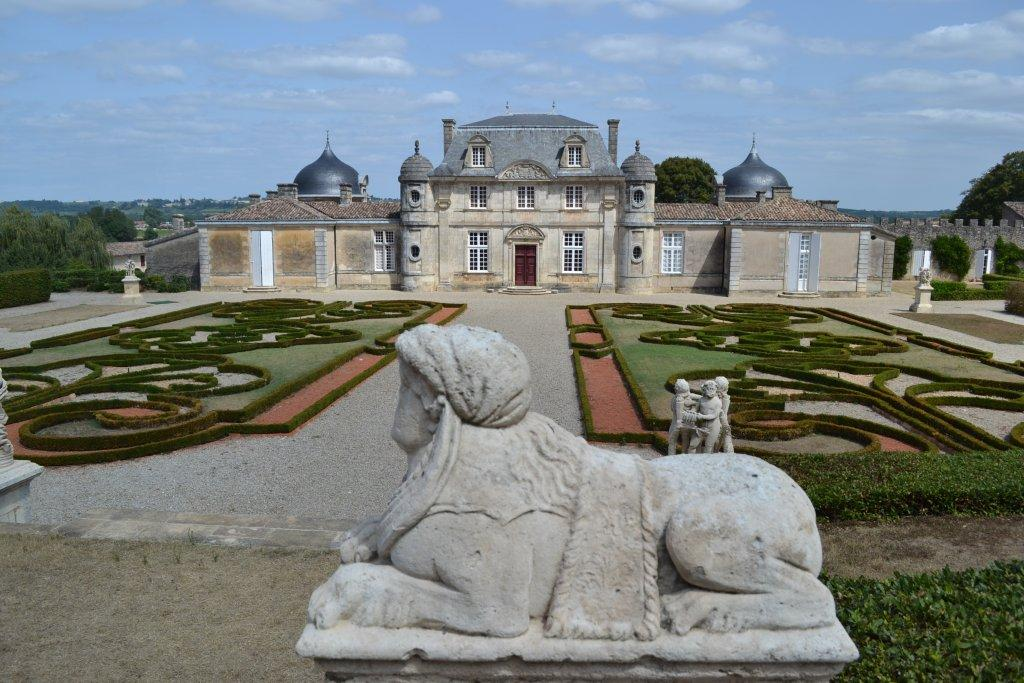
Château de Malle gardens

- Preignac – Gardens of the Château de Malle. These gardens, adjoining a château famous for its sauterne wines, were designed between 1717 and 1724 by Alexandre Eutrope de Lur Saluces, and are considered among the finest gardens of the French classical age. They were inspired by the gardens that he saw in Florence during his grand tour of Italy and his time spent at the court in Versailles. The park has a wide central axis and two terraces, with groups of statues and vases. The statues were done by Italian artists brought there for that purpose in the early part of the 18th century, and represent figures from Greek mythology: Cephalus, Aurora, Cupid, Aphrodite (Venus), Adonis, and Flora, the goddess of flowers and gardens. Other statues represent wine-making, the joys of the hunt and fishing, wine and intoxication. To the east of the first terrace is a small theatre, decorated with figures from the Italian commedia dell'arte: Pantalone, Scaramouche and Harlequin. A stairway leads to a second terrace decorated with statues symbolising of earth, wind, air and fire. (see photos)
- Vayres – Gardens of the Château de Vayres. The château was built on a mound on the edge of the Dordogne River in the 15th century, then rebuilt in the Renaissance when it was given by King Henry IV to the Gourgues family. It was rebuilt one more time at the end of the 17th century. The gardens were rebuilt in 1938 by the landscape architect Ferdinand Duprat. A monumental stairway leads from the château across the old moat to the French gardens by the river, where there are parterres bordered with hedges of yew, and boxwood trees clipped into cone shapes. There is also a flower garden of medieval inspiration, and an English-style park, with cedar, oak, linden, hornbeam and copper beech trees.

(see photos)

=== Landes ===
- Dax – Park of Sarrat. The park, formerly the home and garden of architect René Guichemerre, was created by him from the 1950s until his death in 1988. It contains his modern house, inspired by the architects Richard Neutra and Frank Lloyd Wright; an impressive alley of plane trees; a French garden with fountain and cascade; an extensive kitchen garden; and a botanical garden with 320 kinds of trees, many of them rare.

(See photos)

=== Lot-et-Garonne ===
- Le Temple-sur-Lot – The Gardens of Latour-Marliac, created in 1870 by Joseph Bory Latour-Marliac, are devoted entirely to different species of aquatic plants, particularly the water lily. The gardens feature a grotto, a cascade, thermal springs, a wide variety of tropical vegetation, and the oldest nursery for aquatic plants in the world. In 1894, The Gardens of Latour-Marliac furnished the water lilies for the garden of Claude Monet in Giverny.

(see photos)

=== Pyrénées-Atlantiques ===
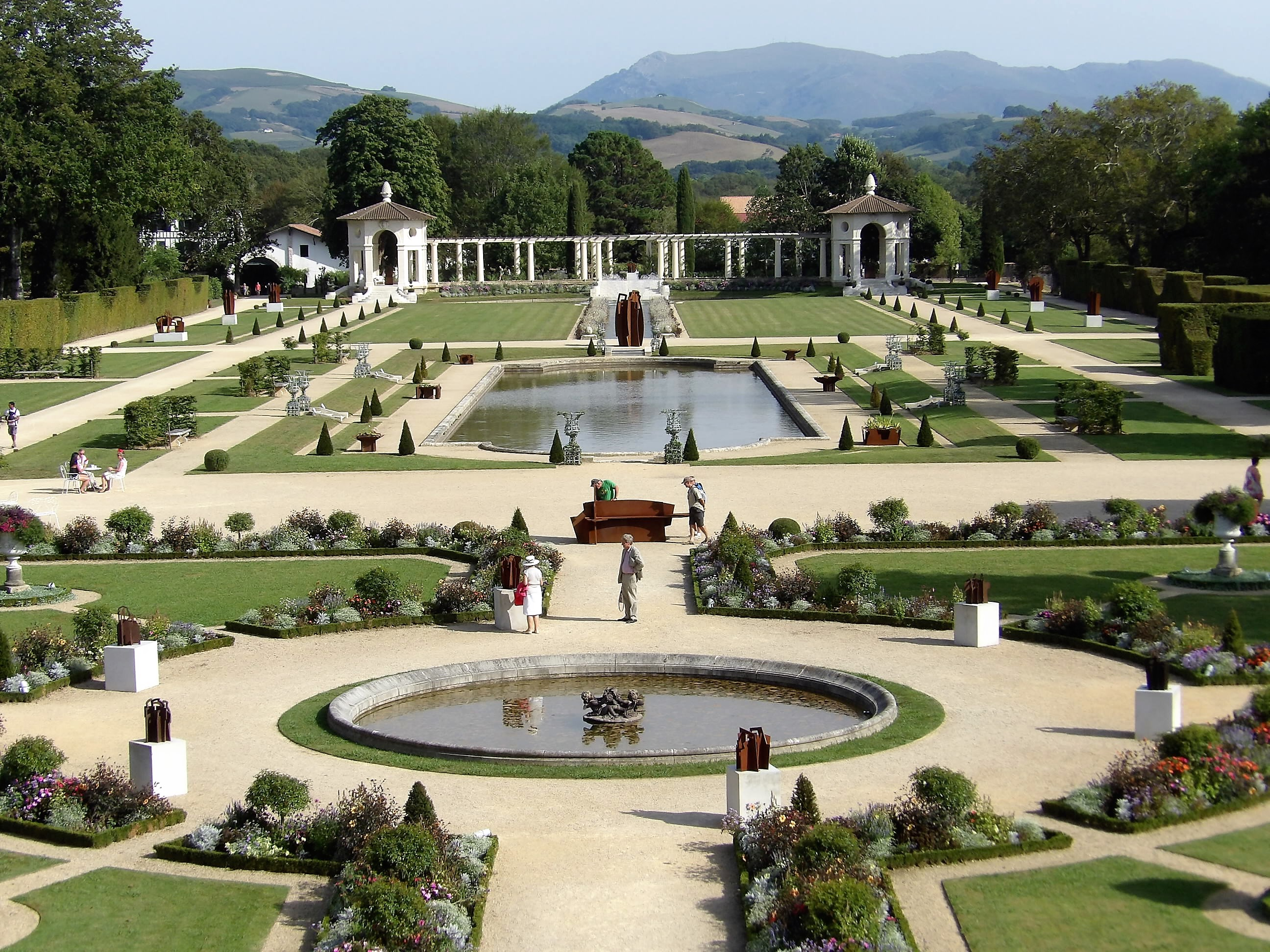
Villa Arnaga gardens

- Cambo-les-Bains – Gardens of the Villa Arnaga. These gardens were created beginning in 1903 by the French playwright Edmond Rostand, the author of Cyrano de Bergerac, next to his home, which is now the Edmond Rostand Museum. The house, in the Basque style, looks out at the Pyrenees. To the east of the house is a formal geometric French garden, with fountains, statues, three basins, a topiary garden, an orangerie, a belvedere a pergola, and a "poet's corner". The garden has colorful annual displays of rhododendrons and azaleas. Around the French garden is a wooded English landscape garden, with clusters of oak, maple, chestnut, walnut, linden, and fir trees. The park descends to banks of the River Arraga, where there is a picturesque water mill.

(see photos)

- Momas – Garden of the Château de Momas. The château is surrounded by gardens inspired by medieval gardens; with sculptures, fountains, a kitchen garden and an aromatic garden; old varieties of fruits and vegetables, and two-hundred-year-old oak and fig trees. (see photos)
- Viven – Gardens of the Château de Viven. The château was first mentioned in the 11th century; it was completely rebuilt in the 18th century. The gardens were redesigned after the original plan in 1988. The French garden features a colorful mosaic of 2,500 begonias, and more than a thousand roses, adorned with hedges and topiary gardens, a fountain and a pavilion. There are annual displays of camellias, azaleas, rhododendrons, hydrangeas, and bougainvilleas.

(see pictures)

== Gardens of the Auvergne ==
=== Allier ===
- Villeneuve-sur-Allier – The Arboretum de Balaine is the oldest private botanical garden in France. It was begun in 1804, but largely was the creation of Aglaé Adanson, the daughter of French naturalist Michel Adanson, who was responsible for the Petit Trianon botanical garden of Louis XV. She settled there in 1812, at the age of thirty, and established it as one of the earliest acclimatization gardens in France, designed to accustom exotic plants from France's colonies to the climate of France. Despite the blockade of Napoleon's Europe by the British fleet, Adanson was able to assemble a remarkable collection of plants from around the world. The garden features a romantic promenade around a pond, and more than 2,500 specimens of trees and plants, including a giant sequoia tree from California six and a half metres in diameter, a bald cypress thirty-five metres high, and a Spanish fir planted before 1850. In spring, the garden has colorful displays of camellias, rhododendrons, magnolias, dove tree, viburnum, and dogwoods. In the fall the garden is noted for its irises, old varieties of roses, and hydrangeas.

(see photos)

=== Puy-de-Dôme ===
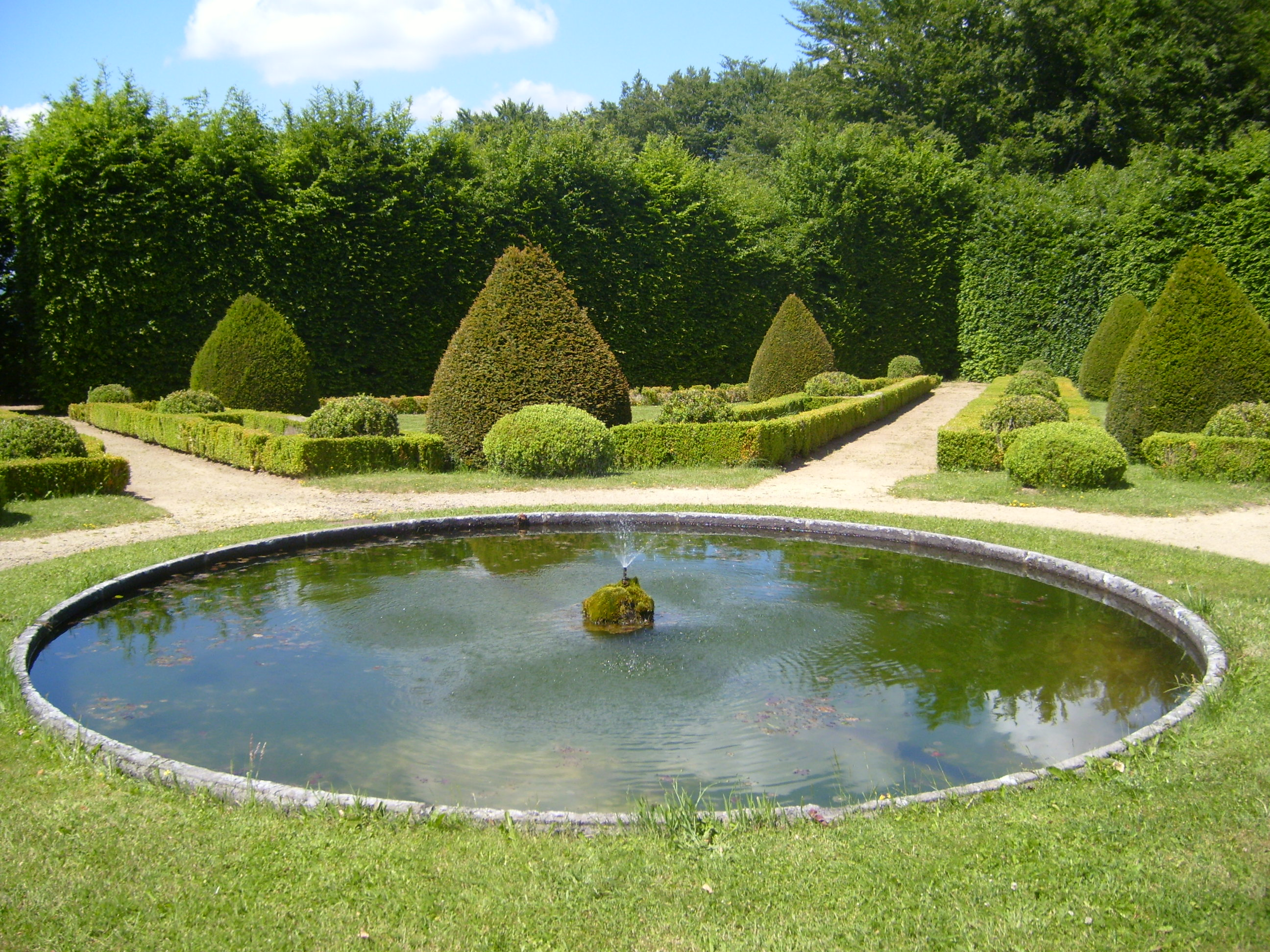
Château de Cordès Puy-de-Dôme

Issoire – The Gardens of the Château d'Hauterive were originally part of the domaine of the Abbey of Issoire, founded in the 10th century. The present buildings date to the late 17th century; documents and old watercolors show that the gardens existed in 1680–1691, with much the same plan as today. The gardens are a classical composition of lawns, avenues, eight parterres around a central basin, hedges, and small groves of trees. Flowers include peonies, irises, lilies, delphiniums, sage, lupins and dahlias. The gardens were badly damaged in the storm of December 1999, when 500 to 700 trees were uprooted or broken. The gardens are being restored. (see photos)

- The Château de Cordès in Orcival. A fifteenth-century chateau with a recreated garden à la française at an altitude of nine hundred meters in the Massif of Mont-Doré.
- Romagnat – Gardens of the Château d'Opme. The château was first built in the 11th century, and belonged to the Counts and then the Dauphins of Auvergne. It was rebuilt in the 17th century by Antoine de Ribeyre, treasurer to the King. The garden dates to 1617. The garden has two parts; a classical garden in the French style, with a circular basin, fountain, and lawns and tree-shaded alleys; and a lower Renaissance garden with fruit trees, flower beds and vegetable gardens laid out in geometric designs. The two parts of the garden are connected by an unusual stone stairway with two revolutions. The fountain with two basins dates to 1617, and is attributed to Androuet du Cerceau.

(see photos)

== Gardens of Burgundy ==
=== Côte d'Or ===
- Arceau – Gardens of the Château d'Arcelot. The gardens, located on a gentle slope between the château and a large pond, were created in 1805 by architect Jean-Marie Morel. They feature a Chinese pavilion, old trees, including a giant bald cypress large enough to hold a man inside; and an orangerie, with vegetable gardens and an orchard.

(see photos)

- Athie – The Mill of Athie. The mill was built in the 16th century and continued to operate until the early 20th century, when it was converted into a cheese-dairy. The garden was created in the late 1970s. It contains a large variety of trees, including chestnuts, maples, and sequoias; four hundred fifty varieties of roses, including three hundred old varieties; one hundred kinds of peonies; a gloriette; a pond of water lilies; and topiary shrubs.

(see photos)

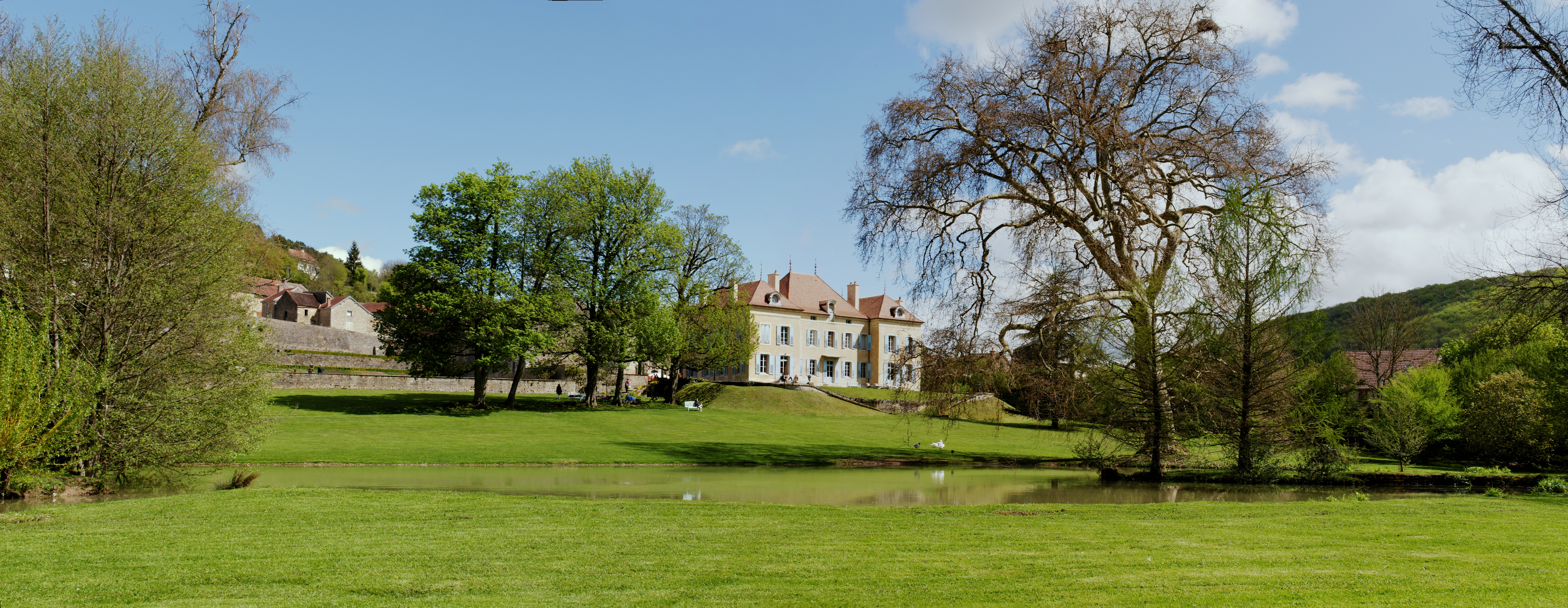
Château de Barbirey gardens

- Barbirey-sur-Ouche – Garden of the Château de Barbirey. A 19th-century English landscape garden surrounding an 18th-century country house. The garden features terraces, kitchen gardens, an orchard, belvedere, and grotto. Trees include plane trees, cedars, maples, chestnuts, and coast sequoias. The orchard contains pear, plum, apple, cherry, apricot, and quince trees. Seasonal flowers include dahlias, peonies, irises and tulips.

(See photos)

- Lantilly – Kitchen Garden of the Château de Lantilly. A garden from the mid-19th century which contains groves of century-old plane trees, cedar, sycamore and catalpa trees; yew trees pruned into fantastic shapes; a large variety of roses, fruit trees, heliotropes, zinnias, peonies, geraniums, astrantias, and Japanese anemones.

(see photos)

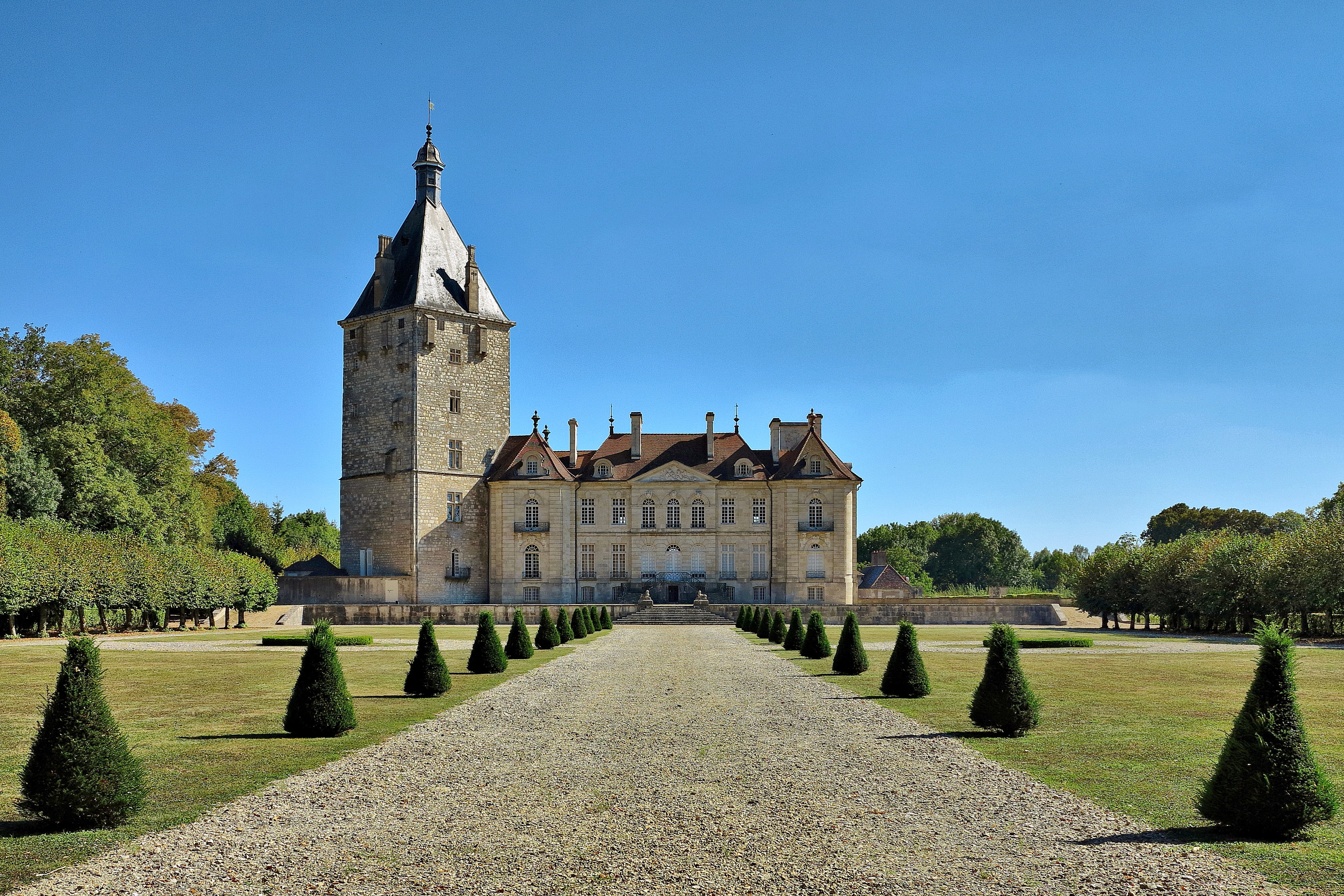
Garden of the Château de Talmay

- Saulieu – Park of Saint-Léger de Fourches. The park once surrounded a large 15th-century château, which is now more modest in size. The present park, created in 1840 and enlarged since 1972, features many old local trees; oaks, hornbeams, beeches and copper beeches; holly and larches; more exotic trees, such as coast sequoias, Canadian hemlocks and American yellowwood; and a spectacular display of rhododendrons in bloom between 15 May and 15 June. (see photos)
- Talmay – Garden of the Château de Talmay. The château is from the mid-18th century; the gardens date to 1752. The gardens have 280 apple and pear trees carved into the shape of bowls; a labyrinth of box trees; hedges of hornbeam; eight giant plane trees planted in 1752; and alleys of peonies, irises and roses.

=== Nièvre ===
- Alligny-en-Morvan – Park and Garden of the Château de La Chaux.

A pastoral garden created in the mid-19th century, around a small château and a hamlet of farm buildings. The garden features many trees planted in 1850, including a double alley of giant sequoias; a grove of Cedar of Lebanon; Copper beeches, ash trees and tulip trees; as well as beds of wisterias, roses, hortensias, alleys of pink peonies and blue irises; lavender; a medicinal herb garden; magnolias, rhododendrons, and a carpet of heather. (See photos)

- Châtillon-en-Bazois – Park and Garden of the Château de Châtillon-en-Bazois.

An English landscape park, a classic French garden, and a modern garden of fountains and basins are placed between a medieval château and a busy canal. The garden has an orangerie with rows of fruit trees and hedges beside the canal; a traditional kitchen garden; and boxwood hedges sculpted into shapes like flocks of sheep. (see photos)

- Coulanges-lès-Nevers – Gardens of Forgeneuve.

A site of an old iron forge, dating from 1660 and 1820, beside the river Nièvre, restored in 1981–1990 and turned into gardens. They feature an English landscape garden, a kitchen garden, flower beds, and many monumental old trees, including a two hundred and fifty year old plane tree.

- Limanton – Garden of the Château de Limanton.

The original gardens had been completely abandoned, and were recreated beginning in 1994 following the inspiration of the 17th-century and 18th-century gardens of the school of Le Nôtre. The garden is laid out in three terraces; the first terrace contains two lawns with sculpted yew trees at the angles; the second has a secret garden, with boxwood hedges, old roses, and a palisaded fig tree; and the third is divided into flower beds and lawns separated by palisades and rows of fruit trees.

=== Saône-et-Loire ===
- Anglure-sous-Dun – The Garden of the Zéphyr.

A private garden of one hectare in the English and contemporary styles, created beginning in 2000 by a couple passionate about gardening, which takes perfect advantage of its hilly site. The wooded portions contain twenty varieties of maple, 10 varieties of birch, and oak, conifers, beech, and hornbeam. Bushes and flowers include hydrangeas, dogwood, dahlias and three hundred varieties of roses. (see photos)

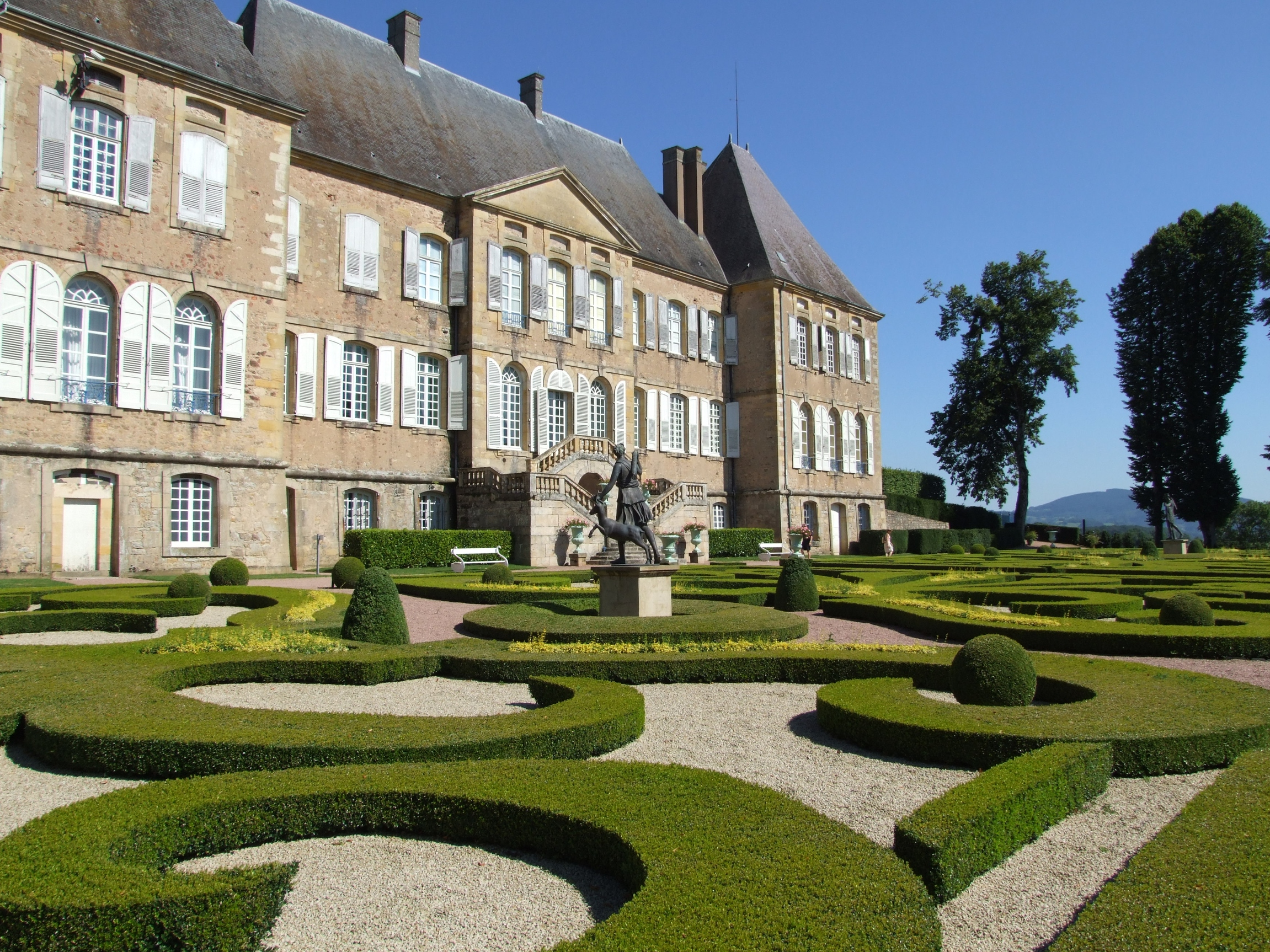
Château de Drée

- Curbigny – Gardens of the Château de Drée.

The château was built in the 17th century, rebuilt in the 19th century, then restored in the 20th century to the way it looked in the 18th century. The gardens, in the French style, feature squares of white and pink roses and lavender; large terraces of flower beds; a fountain with statues by Jean de Bologne from the fountain of Neptune in Florence; a long perspective; a folly called "The Tower of the Demoiselles"; and an elliptical rose garden, with over 1300 rosebushes in pastel colors around a basin.

- Oyé – Gardens of the Château de Chaumont

The present château and gardens in the French style were created in the 18th century, and restored in the 20th century. Parts of château date to the 16th century. The principal feature of the garden is a grand avenue from the gate to the château lined by yew trees shaped into cones, alternating with statues and vases. There are two secondary avenues of double rows of linden trees. The gardens also feature a large rectangle of chestnut trees providing shade, and avenues of hornbeam hedges 350 metres long on the west and south.

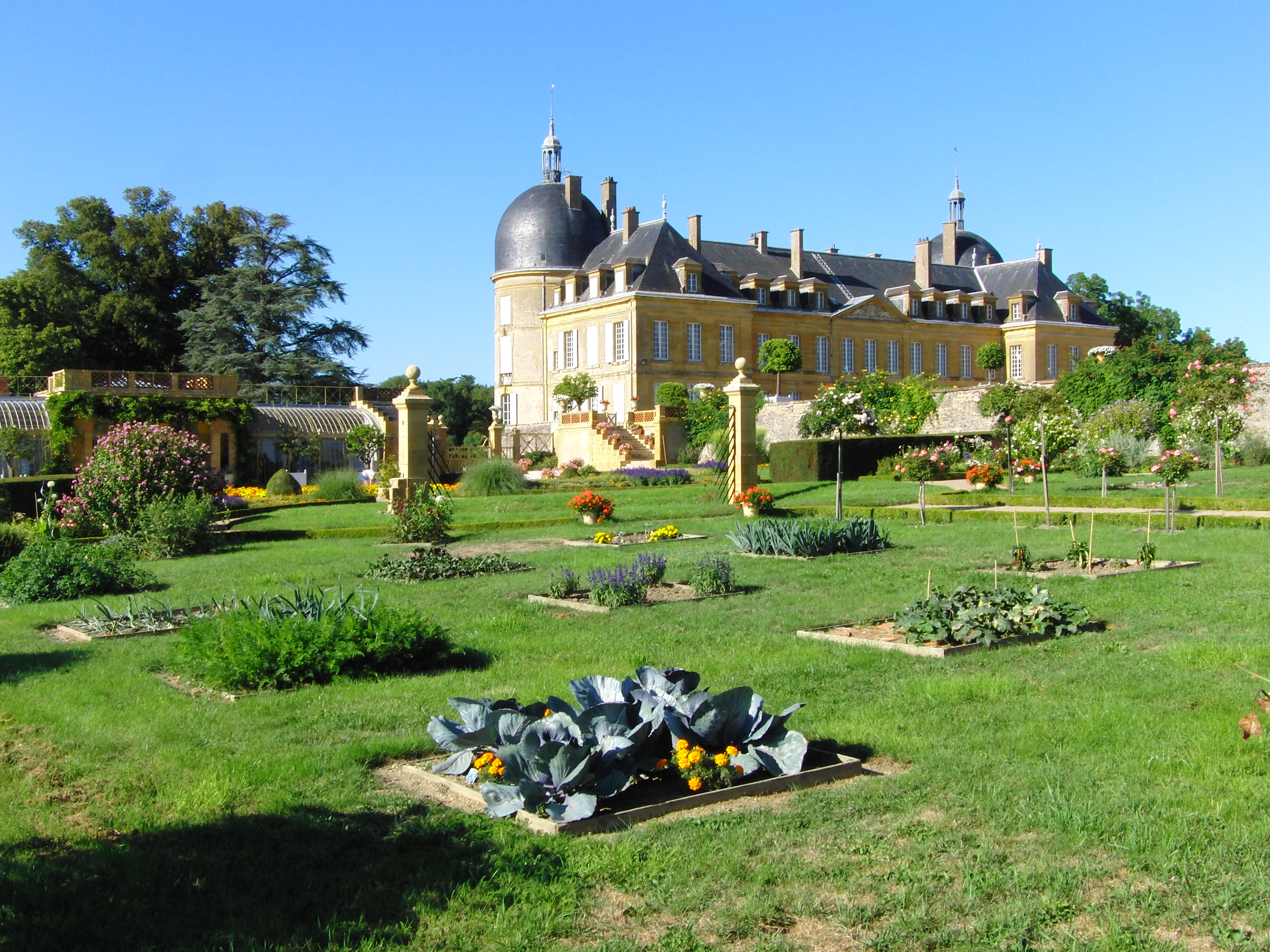
Potager at Château de Digoine

- Palinges – Gardens of the Château de Digoine

The 18th-century château is set in a French garden and a 35-hectare English landscape park, designed by the architect Veringuet. A notable feature is the neo-classical greenhouse, built in the 1830s. The French garden has boxed palm trees and orange trees carved into the shape of half-domes and colombiers, copying the shape of the domes of the château. The English landscape park has four km of avenues, a variety of forest trees and exotic ornamental trees, a lake, a river and a grotto. The flower garden next to the greenhouse was redesigned in the 1920s by landscape architect Achille Duchêne, and the kitchen garden occupies the place of the former cemetery of the convent of the Brothers of Picpus, from the 18th century.

- Sully -Park and Kitchen Gardens of the Château de Sully.

The château and gardens date to the 18th and 19th centuries, and combine elements of an English park forested avenues and giant sequoias, with a classical 18th-century French garden (a kitchen garden, fruit trees, a grand avenue leading to the house, an ornamental forecourt and flower beds.)

- Varenne-l'Arconce – The Romanesque Gardens (fr: Jardins Romans)

A contemporary botanical garden with five themes; an ethnobotanic garden, with historical plants useful to mankind; the Garden of Charlemagne, with plants which the Emperor Charlemagne decreed be planted at every monastery in the Empire, as well as plants imported from the Americas (corn, tomatoes, potatoes); The garden of acclimatization, with new, unusual and forgotten kinds of plants; the garden of scents, with wide variety of aromatic plants, and a tunnel of roses, jasmine and clematis; and an aquatic garden, with both local aquatic plants and exotic water plants, such as water lilies, lotus and papyrus of the Nile.

=== Yonne ===
- Thorigny-sur-Oreuse – Park of the Château de Thorigny.

The park was originally the domaine of the Jean-Baptiste Lambert, the treasurer of the superintendent of finances of Louis XIV, who built a château there around 1641, and who commissioned Le Nôtre to design the gardens. The château was destroyed during the French Revolution of 1789. The park was purchased in 1843 by Pierre Carlier, the Chief of the French Police from 1849 to 1851, who helped organize the coup d'état of Louis Napoléon Bonaparte in 1852. He re-created the garden as it is today, with canals, a stream and cascade, hedges, roses, plane trees, fruit trees and flower beds.

(see pictures)

== Gardens of Brittany ==
=== Côtes-d'Armor ===
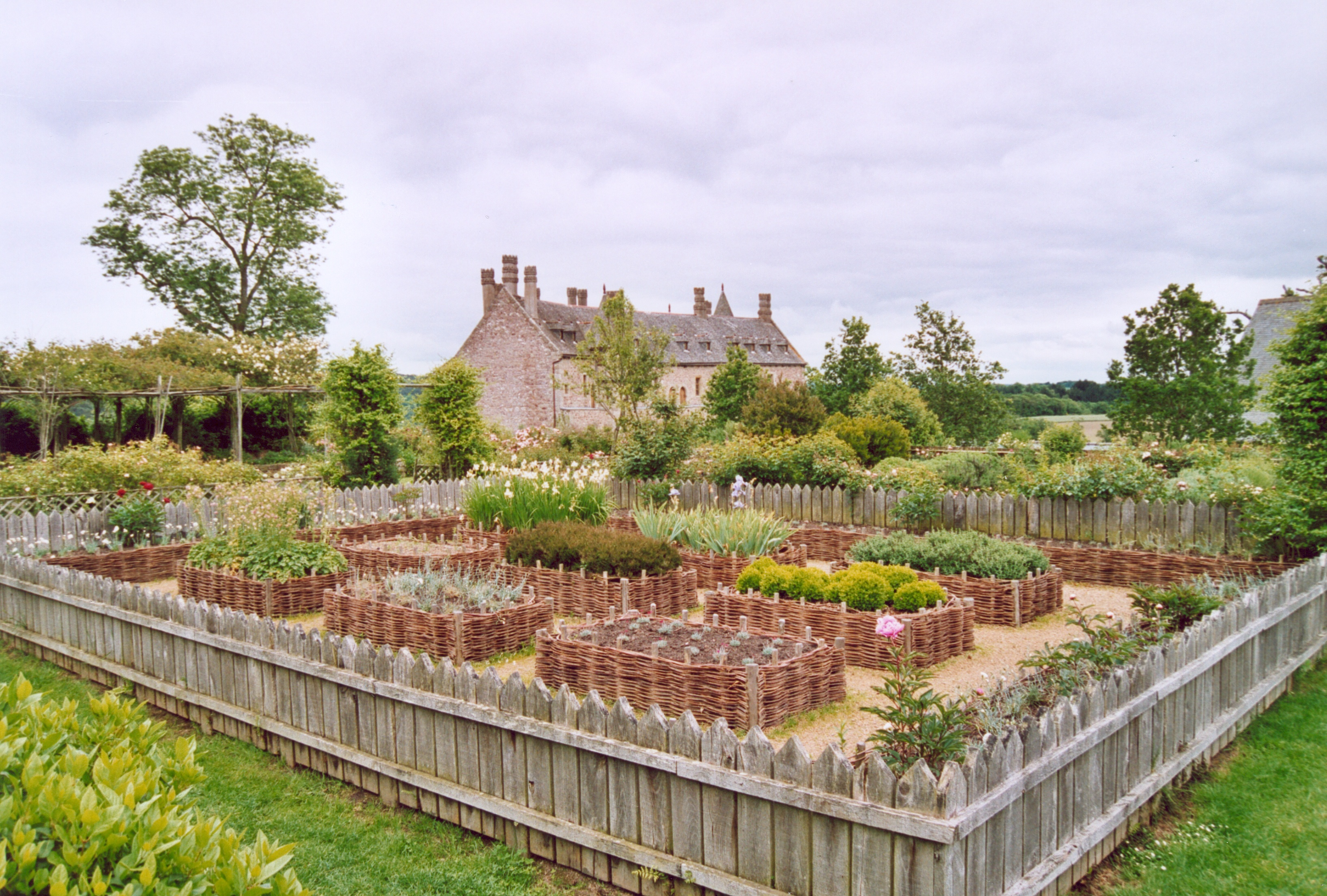
Garden of the Château de la Roche-Jagu, Côtes d'Armor

- Ploëzal – Garden of the château de la Roche-Jagu.

A contemporary garden, inspired by medieval gardens, overlooking the estuary of the Trieux River. The centerpiece is a great oak, 350 years old, in the courtyard of the château. The garden features a medieval kitchen garden; a medicinal garden, a medieval flower garden; an avenue of camellias, with one thousand plants of 350 varieties; palm trees; a rose garden; jasmine, wisterias, grapevines, and an alley of pergolas with honeysuckle. (see photos)

- Trédarzec – Garden of Kerdalo.

A romantic English garden and botanical garden, created in 1965. It includes basins, cascades and a water staircase; Italian terraces; and a fine collection of magnolias, camellias, rhododendrons, and plants of Australia, New Zealand and the Mediterranean.(see photos)

=== Finistère ===
- Île de Batz – Garden of George Delasselle. Windswept sand dunes on the Breton coast were transformed into a subtropical oasis and garden in 1897, with many varieties of cacti, palms and other plants from the northern and southern hemispheres. The garden was abandoned for thirty years, then restored beginning in 1987. (see photos)
- Combrit – The Botanical Garden of Cornouaille. A private botanical garden created in 1983, with more than two thousand varieties of trees, bushes and plants from around the world. The garden features a large water garden with many varieties of aquatic plants. (see photos) Bonus : A very rich minerals museum
- Huelgoat – The Poërop Arboretum. The arboretum was begun in 1993, in a hilly setting in the interior of Brittany. The most unusual feature is a garden of medicinal plants from Nepal and from the Yunnan Province in China, which recreates a valley in the Himalaya mountains. It also includes eucalyptus trees and plants from Australia; a water garden with ducks and other water birds; sixty kinds of bamboo; and a rose garden.

(see photos)

- Quimper – Garden of the Château de Lanniron. The Château de Lanniron was the former palace of the bishop of Quimper. The gardens were created in the 17th century by Monseigneur de Coëtlogon between 1668 and 1670. They lie next to the River Odet, and retain their original 17th-century layout- three terraces, including one for flowers and one for vegetables, descending to the river; several basins, fountains and a canal. The gardens now include an arboretum, with an exceptional assortment of trees, including a Magnolia grandiflora, Ginkgo biloba, Cryptomeria japonica and a giant sequoia. (see photos)
- Roscoff – The Exotic Garden of Roscoff. The exotic garden of the town of Roscoff was created beginning in 1986, around a massive rock eighteen meters high. It is dedicated to subtropical and exotic plants, and contains over three thousand different plants from Africa, Asia, the Americas and Australia, including many rare and endangered plants. The trees include one hundred eucalyptus from Australia.

(See photos)

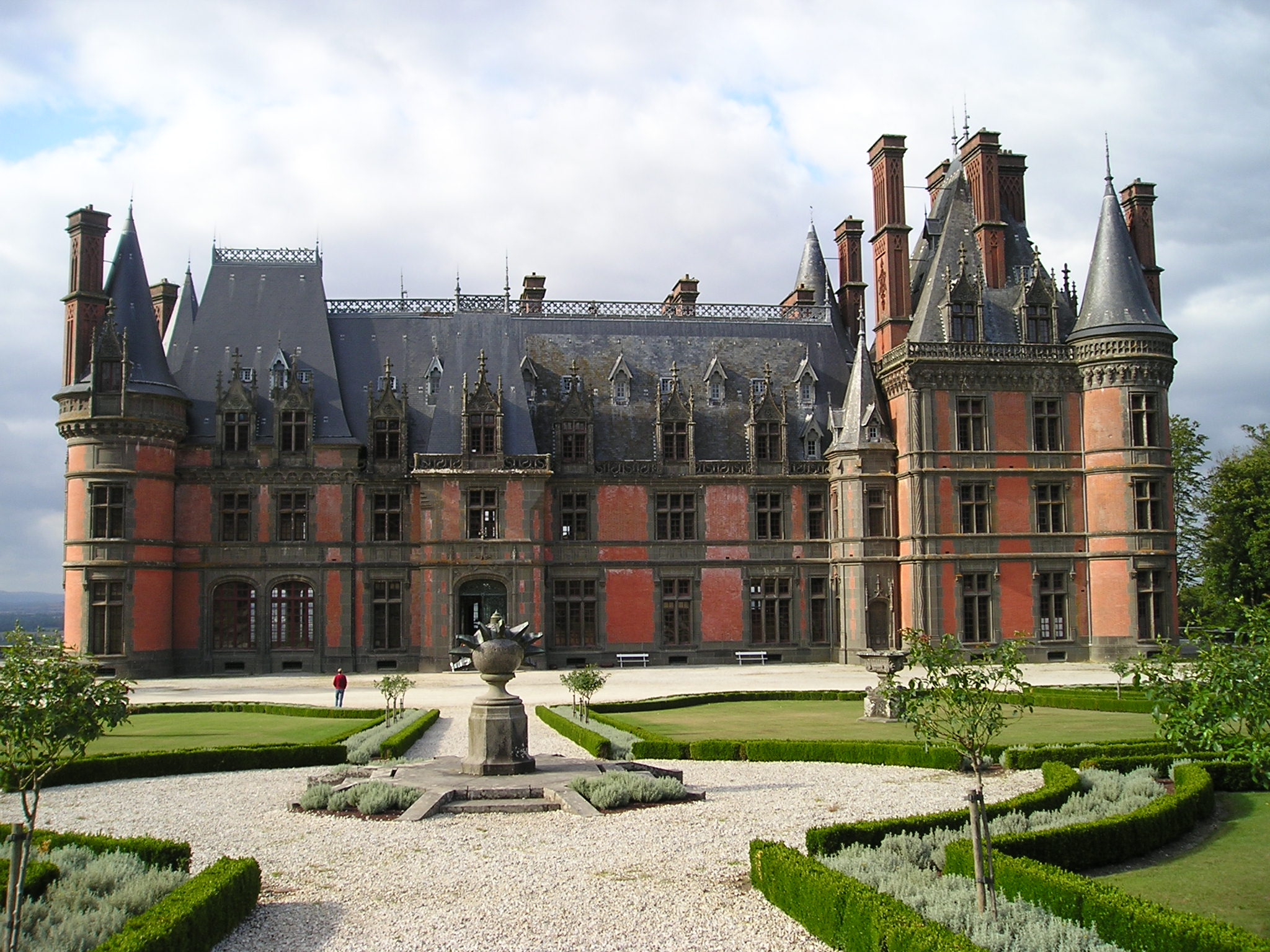
Château de Trevarez

- Saint-Goazec – Park of the Château de Trevarez. The Château of red brick and gardens were created between 1894 and 1906 by the industrialist James Montjarret de Kerjégu. During World War II the château was requisitioned by the German U-boat fleet. It was bombed by the RAF in 1944, and the holes in the roof were not restored until the 1990s.

The château is best known for its flower gardens, on the esplanade by the château and the stables. It also has an English-style park, fountains, sculpture and a cascade, all recently restored. (see photos)

=== Ille-et-Vilaine ===
- Antrain – The Park of the Château de Bonnefontaine is a large French landscape garden surrounding a restored 15th–16th-century château in the Breton Renaissance style. The garden was created beginning in 1860, when the château was restored. The garden and château are presently owned by the Count Merendec de Rohan Chabot. The 25-hectare garden consists of large natural spaces with perspectives and groves of trees, both local and exotic. The trees in the park include sequoias, bald cypresses, magnolias, cedars, palms, some three-hundred-year-old chestnut and plane trees, fuchsias, roses, hortensias, and rhododendrons. The park is known for the chestnut tree of Duchess Anne of Brittany, the last Duchess of the region, who used to sit under the tree. The tree was uprooted by a storm in 1987. (see photos)

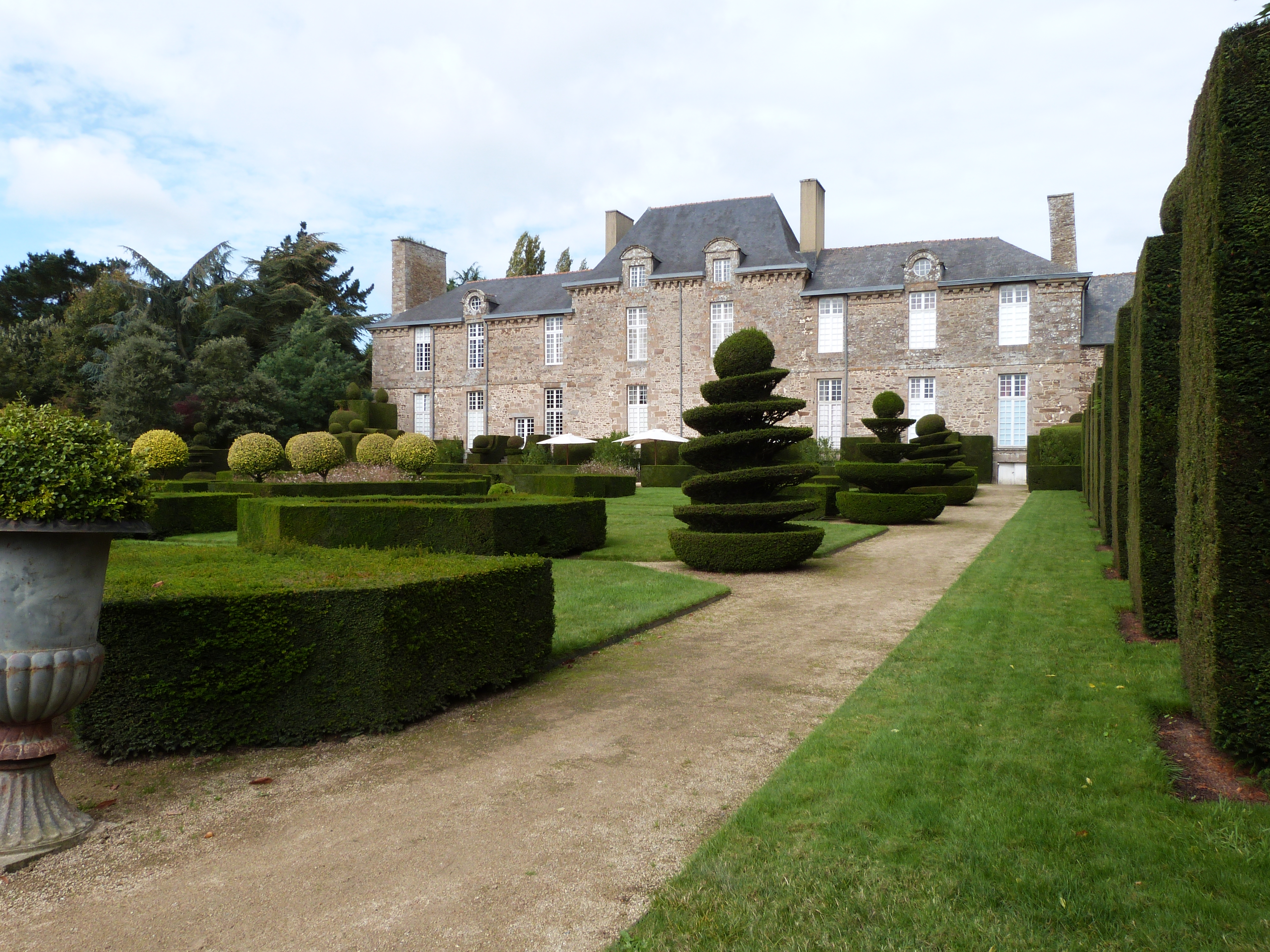
Garden of the Château de la Ballue

- Bazouges-la-Pérouse – Garden of the Château de la Ballue. An unusual Italian garden in the mannerist style, created in 1973 by the futurist architects Paul Maymont and François-Hébert Stevens. The château dates to the 17th and 18th centuries, and originally had a garden à la française on the south terrace, which was later demolished and made into a potato field. The garden today features an alley of wisterias supported by yew trees, and a picturesque winding labyrinth.

(see photos)

- Bécherel – Park of the château de Caradeuc. The château was built around 1723 by the father of the Procureur of Brittany, Louis-René Caradeuc de la Chatolais (1701–1785) in the classical regency style, French landscape park. At the end of the 19th century, the new owner, Count René de Kernier, ancestor of the present owner, asked the famed landscape architect Édouard André, best known for the Parc des Buttes Chaumont in Paris, to design the garden you see today. In the 20th century, many pieces of sculpture were added to the garden, including a rare statue of Louis XVI by the sculptor Molchenet and many figures from mythology, placed on the lawns and in niches in the boxwood hedges. The garden has long perspectives, lawns, avenues, a pavilion, kiosks and a grotto, as well as many fine stands of old trees, including lindens and American red oaks, and parterres of red and white roses.

(see photos)

- Bréal-sous-Montfort – Gardens of Broceliande Created in 1995, this 24-hectare park contains French, English, botanical, flower and kitchen gardens. Highlights include 1000 varieties of irises, 400 kinds of lilacs; 150 old apple trees; 60 types of hortensias; 150 kinds of dahlias; and 150 oak and maple trees.

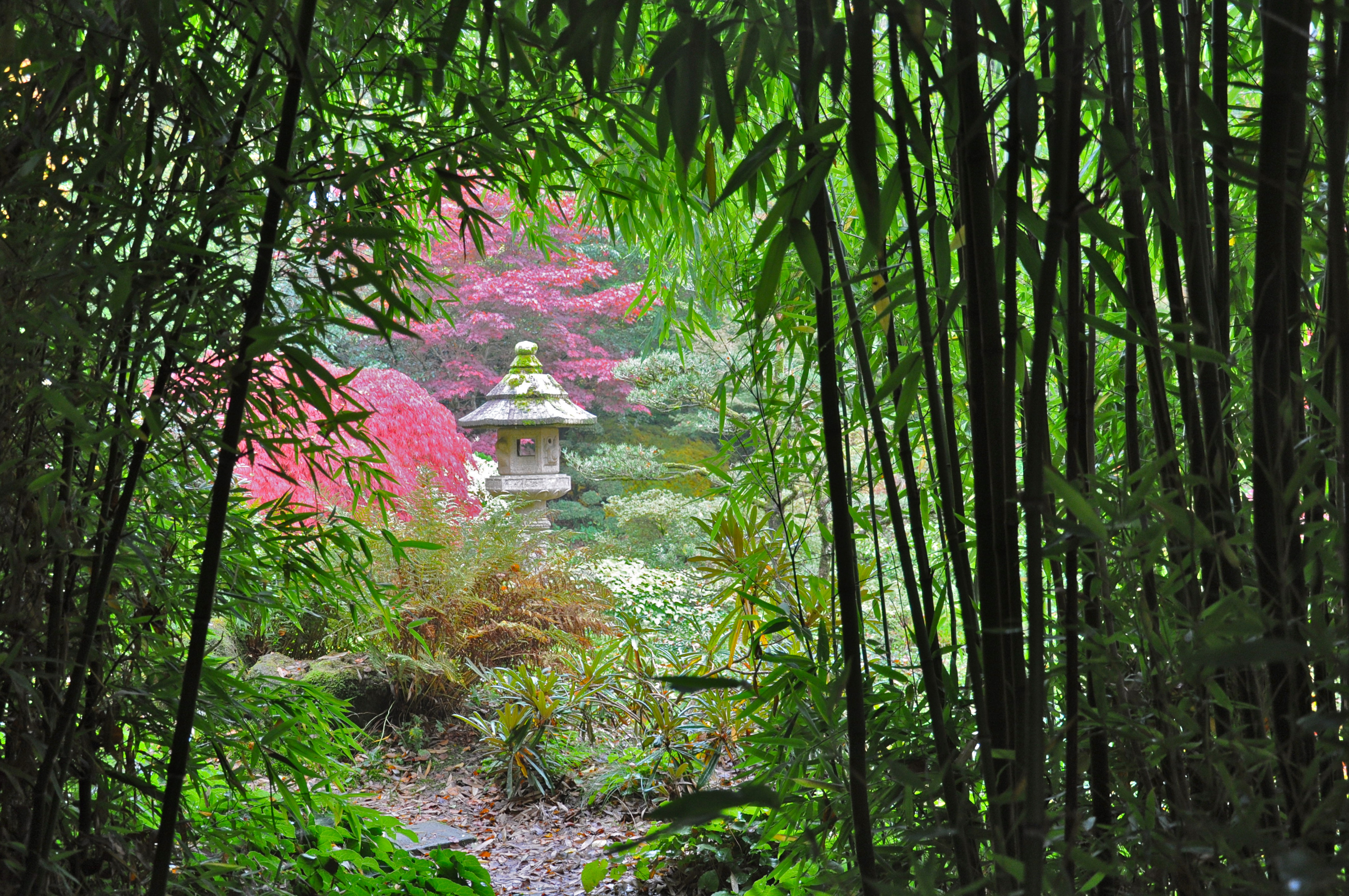
Botanical garden of Upper Brittany

- Le Châtellier – The Gardens of Haute-Bretagne, Botanical garden of Upper Brittany. The Manor of Foltière, which stood in the gardens, was the headquarters of an uprising against the government of the French Republic in 1796 led by the comte de Puisaye. In 1847, the land surrounding the pond in the park was redesigned as an English romantic landscape garden, with winding paths that followed the terrain, and a perspective from the lawn in front of the manor to the church tower of the village.

The botanical park is made up of 24 gardens and three parts : the Arcadia' gardens that refer to classical antiquity and recall the youth, the romantic gardens represent maturity and plenitude, the twilight' gardens offer a timeless composition which represents the old age. The gardens have over seven thousand varieties of plants, particularly those that grow well in an acid soil, including camellias, magnolias, rhododendrons and hydrangeas. The four hundred camellias reach their peak around 20 March, while the azaleas flower in April. (see photos) |Parc Botanique de Haute-Bretagne

- Pleurtuit – Gardens of Montmarin. A manor in the picturesque Saint-Malo style was built in 1760 by the Aaron Pierre Magon, Seigneur de Bosc, then sold to shipbuilder Benjamin Dubois in 1782. The original garden had four terraces of French gardens descending to the Rance River. In 1885, the lower two terraces were turned into romantic gardens with many exotic plants, including palms and a 250-year-old magnolia. The garden was badly damaged by a storm in 1987, but has been restored. (see photos)

=== Morbihan ===
- Landaul – Gardens of the Château de Kerambar'h. The château dates to the Middle Ages, when Brittany was an independent state. The gardens were recreated from medieval manuscripts to the way they were between the 14th century and 16th century, laid out in a symmetrical pattern inspired by the Cross of St. George and the Cross of St. Andrew. The vegetable garden allowed the château to be independent. The liturgical garden provided flowers for the altar of the chapel. The Garden of the Third Flower was a reminder that flowers were a medieval symbol of virtue. The Capitulary Garden contained medicinal plants as well as edible plants. The Garden of Courtly Pleasures was designed to elevate the spirit. The garden contains ancient roses and a number of oak trees more than three hundred years old.

(see pictures)

- Lorient – Park Victor Chevassu. This English-style and botanical garden is on the site of former quarry and the early 20th-century estate of Lorient businessman Victor Chevassu. It was bought by the city of Lorient in 1973 for development, but after protests it was turned into a park and the old house and garden restored. Today it features a stream which flows into two ponds; a collection of exotic tropical ferns and giant bamboo; collections of camellias and rhododendrons; an animal park for children; large old oak trees; and colorful seasonal flowers in spring and summer. (see pictures)

== Gardens of the Centre-Val de Loire ==
=== Cher ===
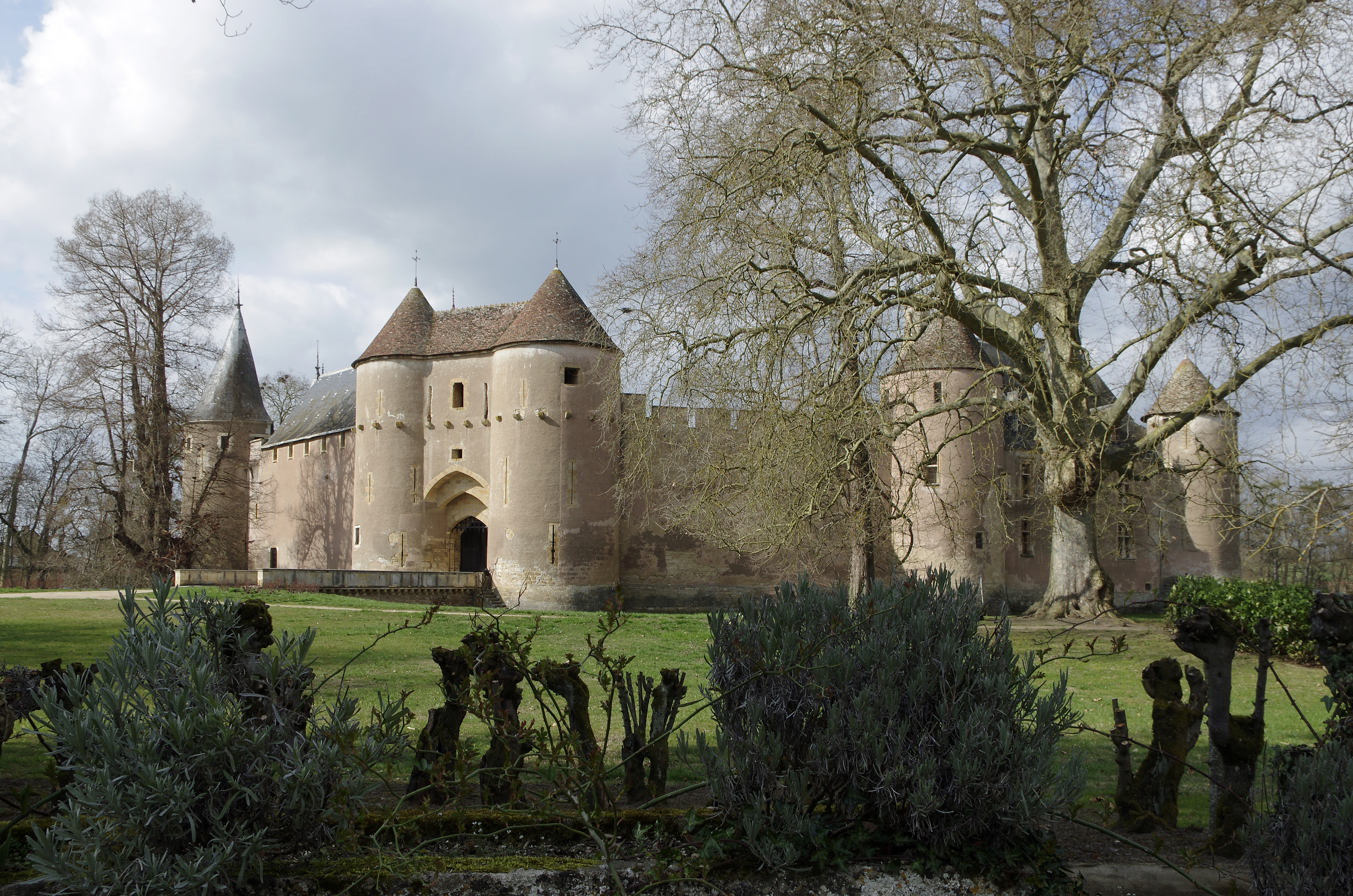
Gardens of the Château d'Ainay-le-Vieil

- Ainay-le-Vieil – Gardens of the Château d'Ainay-le-Vieil. The gardens feature a large collection of roses, a one-hectare island garden, a meditation garden, and a topiary garden of trees and shrubs carved into ornamental shapes.
- Apremont-sur-Allier – Flower gardens of Apremont.
- Bourges – Garden of Prés Fichaux.
- Chassy – Gardens of the Château de Villiers. The château dates to the 17th and 18th centuries, and originally had a formal French floral garden laid out in parterres. The château and gardens were abandoned after the French Revolution, and restored beginning in 1985. Features include the floral gardens, roses, and a lake with wild herons.
- Maisonnais – Gardens of the Priory of Notre-Dame-d'Orsan. The Priory was built in the 12th century, and rebuilt in the 16th and 17th centuries, then abandoned after the French Revolution. It was bought by two architects in 1992, who recreated the gardens in a modern form following the inspiration of medieval monasteries. It features a labyrinth of fruit trees, a pergola, and a cloister garden with a fountain symbolizing the source of the four rivers of Paradise.
- Loye-sur-Arnon – The Gardens of Drulon. The 15-hectare park is composed of six gardens on different themes, ornamented with modern sculpture. Features include the secret garden of the château, 500 different kinds of roses, and a marsh surrounded by paths and natural labyrinths created by grazing sheep. In 2004 and 2006 a peony garden with over 300 different tree peonies was created, making Drulon one of the biggest peony gardens of France. This new garden was completed with a large collection of David Austin roses and an enormous number of hemerocallis (day-lilies).

=== Eure-et-Loir ===
- Illiers-Combray – The Pré Catelan. The forested park along the Loire River was created in the 19th century by Jules Amiot, the uncle of author Marcel Proust. Proust played there as a child – in Proust's novel In Search of Lost Time, the park is called Le Parc de Swann. The lower part of the park has several small exotic ornamental structures, recalling Algeria, where Amiot spent part of his life.

=== Indre ===
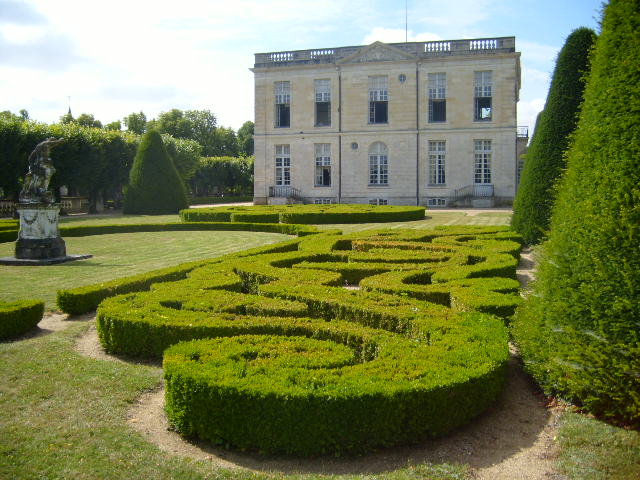
The Château de Bouges

- Bouges-le-Château – Gardens of the Château de Bouges. The château was built in 1765 on lands acquired by Charles-François Leblanc de Manarval, the master of the royal forges and the director of the royal manufacturer of cloth in Châteauroux, and was modeled after the Petit Trianon Palace in the domain of Versailles. After the French Revolution, the château became the property of Charles-Maurice de Talleyrand-Périgord, the Foreign Minister of Emperor Napoleon. Talleyrand put it at the disposition of Dorothée de Courlande (1793–1862), a wealthy heiress who had been Talleyrand's mistress. and married Talleyrand's nephew. In 1917, the château was purchased by the industrialist Henry Viguier and his wife, Renée Normant, who restored it, decorated and refurnished it. The Viguiers, who had no children, left the house and its furniture to the French State.

The château has a park of eighty hectares, which include a landscape garden, an arboretum, large greenhouses, and a formal French garden. The château and the park were used as sets for scenes of the film Colonel Chabert with Gérard Depardieu and Fanny Ardant(see photos)

- Nohant – The Garden of the House of George Sand. The home and garden of writer George Sand, purchased by the French State in 1961 and carefully restored to the way it was during the writer's life, when she hosted Frédéric Chopin, Delacroix, Balzac, and other great writers and artists of her time. It combines features of a utopian 18th-century French garden and a romantic English garden. It has a court of honor under a large yew tree; an avenue that crosses the wooded park to a lake; a garden of aromatic plants; a garden of cedar trees; and a garden of climbing roses.

=== Indre-et-Loire ===
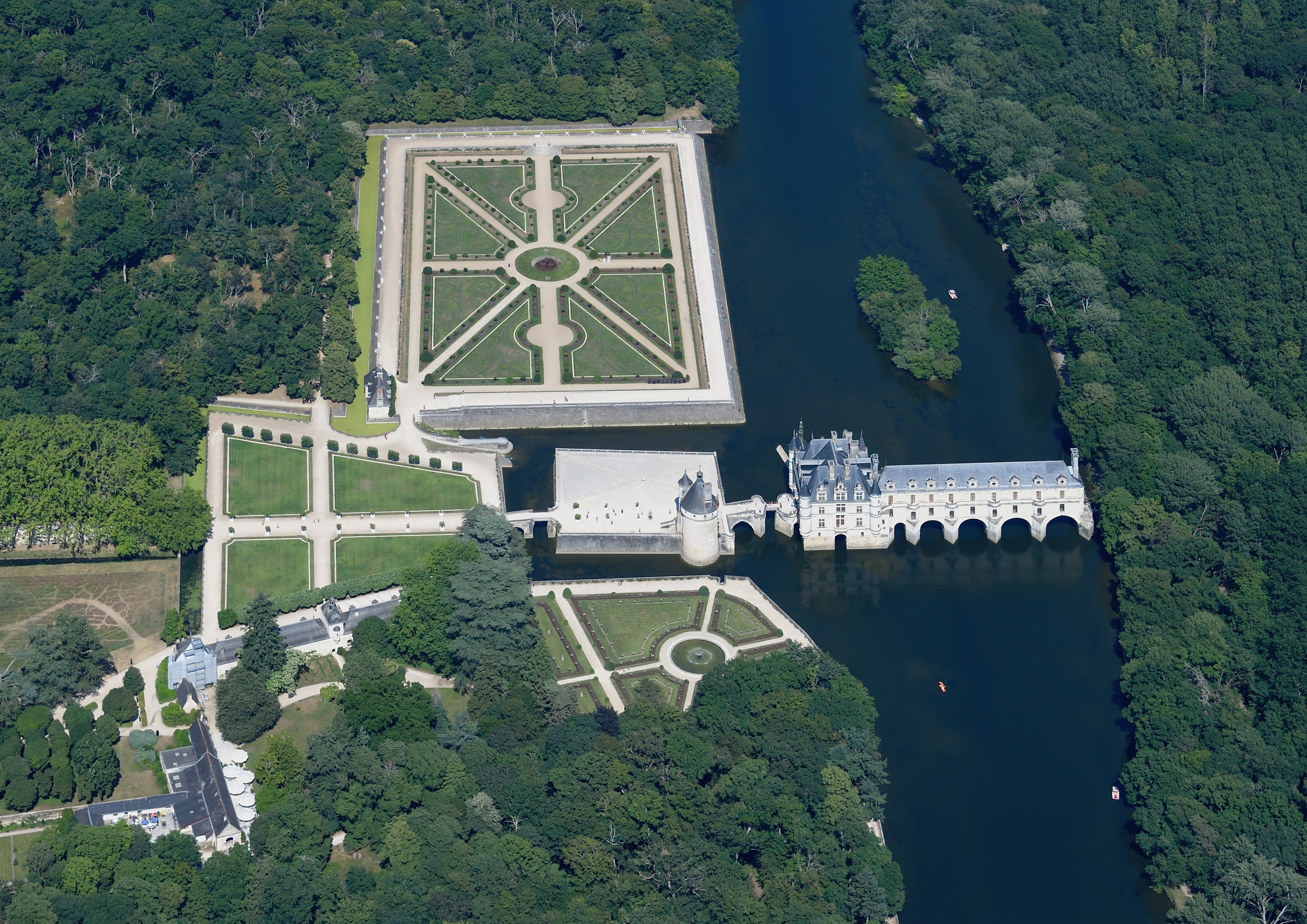
Aerial view of Château de Chenonceau and its gardens

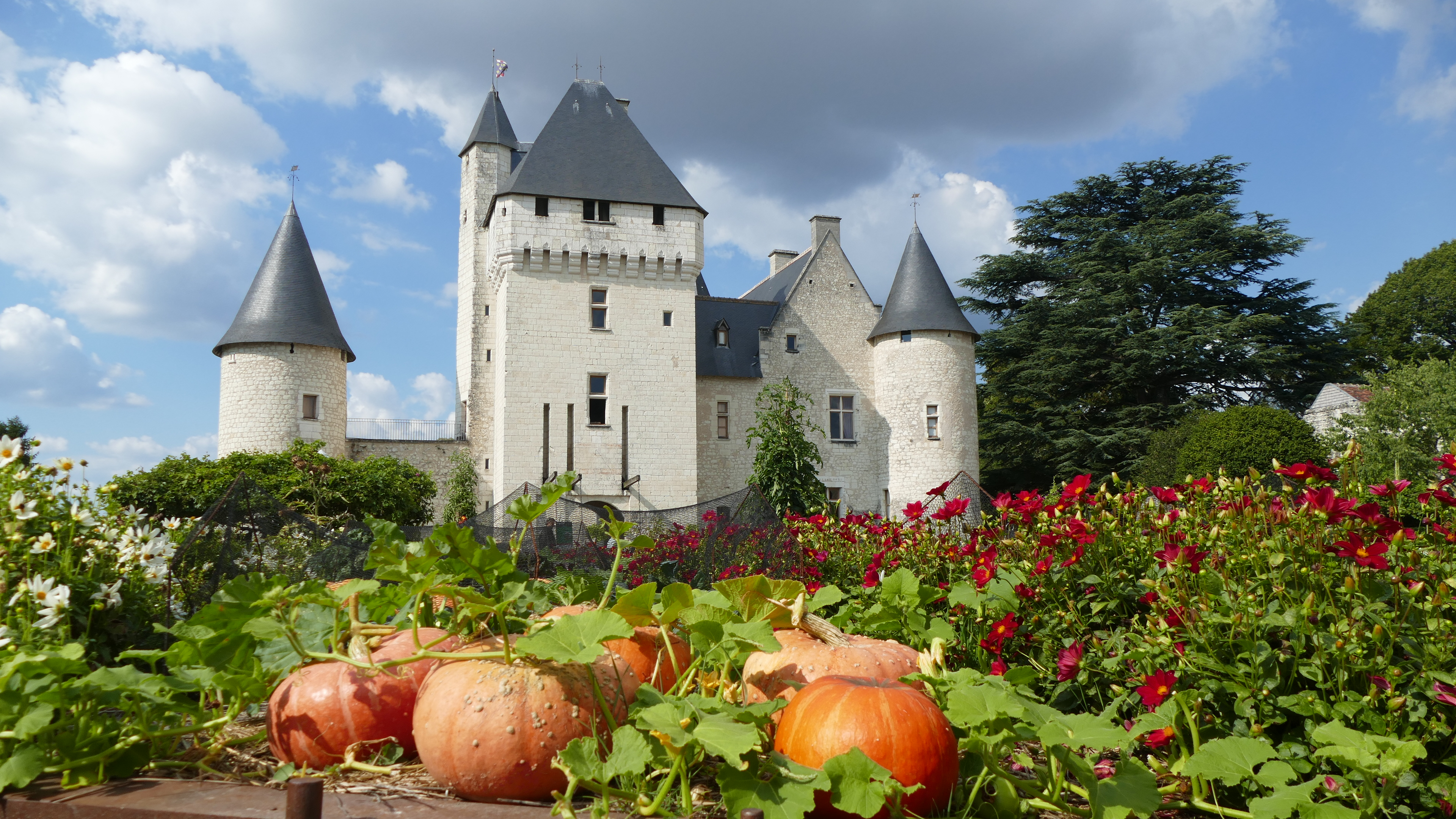
Château du Rivau

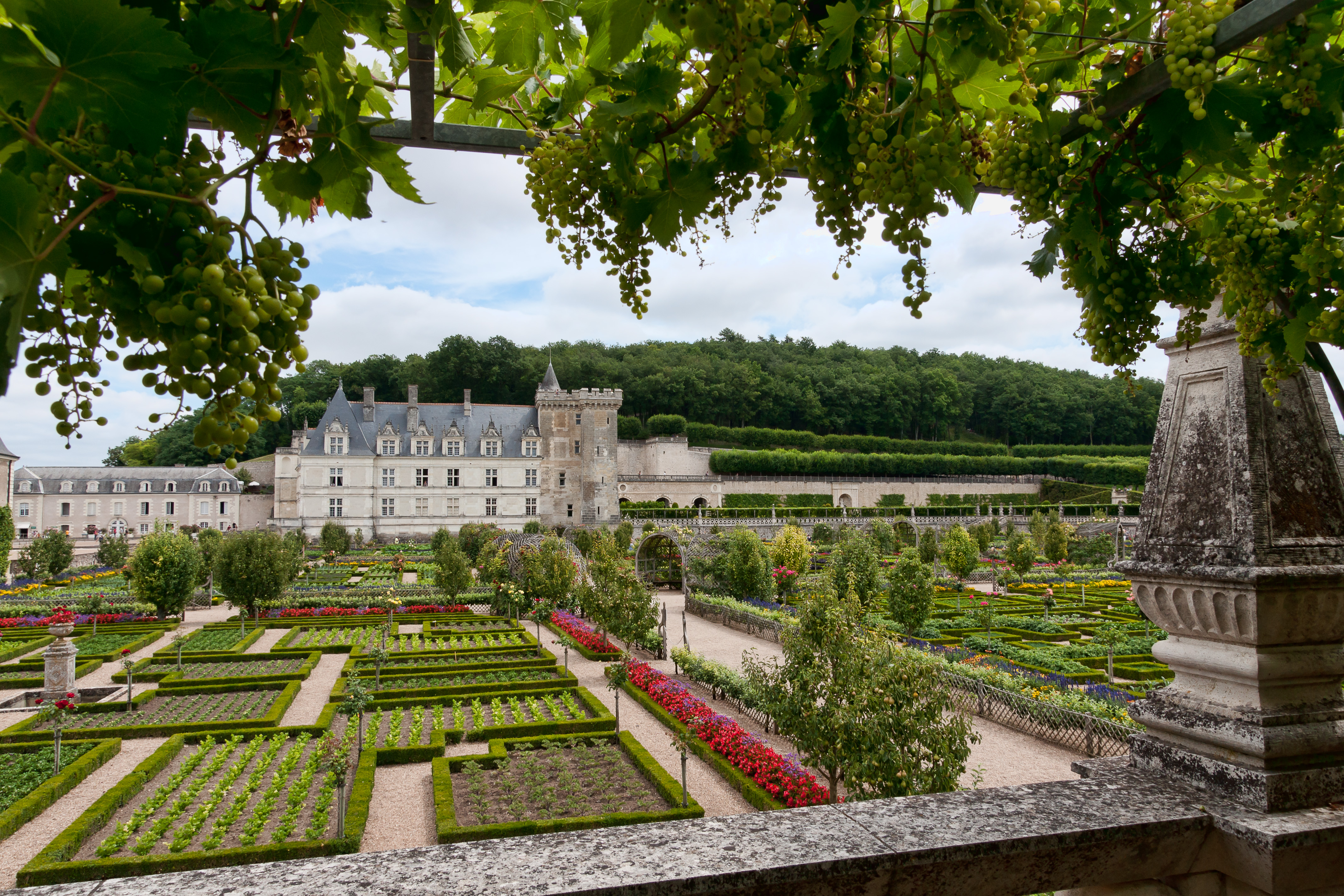
Château de Villandry gardens

- Azay-le-Rideau – The Gardens of la Chatonnière are located three kilometers from the château of Azay-le-Rideau. They were created beginning in 1993 around the restored medieval château de la Chatonnière by gardener Ahmed Azeroual, who was head gardener at the Château de Villandry for twenty years. They are composed of ten gardens, each with a different theme: Silence, the Senses, Fragrance, Intelligence, Elegance, Abundance, Water, Wonder, Luxuriance, and Romance. Features include a pergola covered with roses, and an abundance of clematis and wisterias.
- Chenonceaux – Park and Gardens of the Château de Chenonceau. The château has two carefully restored Renaissance gardens; that of Diane de Poitiers (1499–1566), which still has its original fountain, and that of Catherine de Médicis (1519–1589). It also possesses a circular maze one hectare in area, created with two thousand yew trees a meter and thirty centimeters high, with a gloriette in the middle, so those who reach the center can see the entire maze.
- Chançay – The Park and Gardens of the Château de Valmer belong to a domaine which produces the local Vouvray wine. The gardens, in the French and Italian style, feature a colorful mixture of fruit trees, vegetable gardens and floral displays, ornamented with balustrades and fountains and a labyrinth. From August to October visitors can find a garden filled with giant squash. There is also an underground chapel dating from 1524 in the garden.

(see photos)

- La Riche – The Gardens of the Priory of Saint-Cosme.
- Lémeré – The Gardens of the Château du Rivau surround a restored white stone castle built from the 13th century to the 15th century. They are composed of twelve different gardens, and feature a 16th-century fountain, modern sculpture, and a maze. Six thousand irises are in bloom in May, four hundred types of roses in June, and poppies and other flowers cover the fields around the château in summer.(see photos of the Gardens of Chateau Le Rivau)
- Tours – The Prébendes d'Oë is a municipal landscape park and arboretum in the city of Tours. It was created by the Bühler brothers in 1874. It features a group of bald cypresses, statues, and a bandstand.
- Villandry – The gardens of the Château de Villandry. One of the grandest and most-visited of French gardens. The château was built in 1536 by Jean Le Breton, Minister of Finance of Francis I of France. It was modified in the 18th century, then purchased in 1906 by Joachim Carvallo. He and his descendants devoted their attention lavishly to the gardens over the last century. The gardens are laid out on three terraces, and feature a water garden, an ornamental vegetable garden, and several salons of ornamental plants, as well as a maze and a forest. Nine gardeners work full-time on the 1,200 linden trees, nine hectares of garden, and fiFty-two kilometers of hedges.

(See photos)

=== Loir-et-Cher ===
- Blois – Rose gardens and terraces of the bishop's residence.

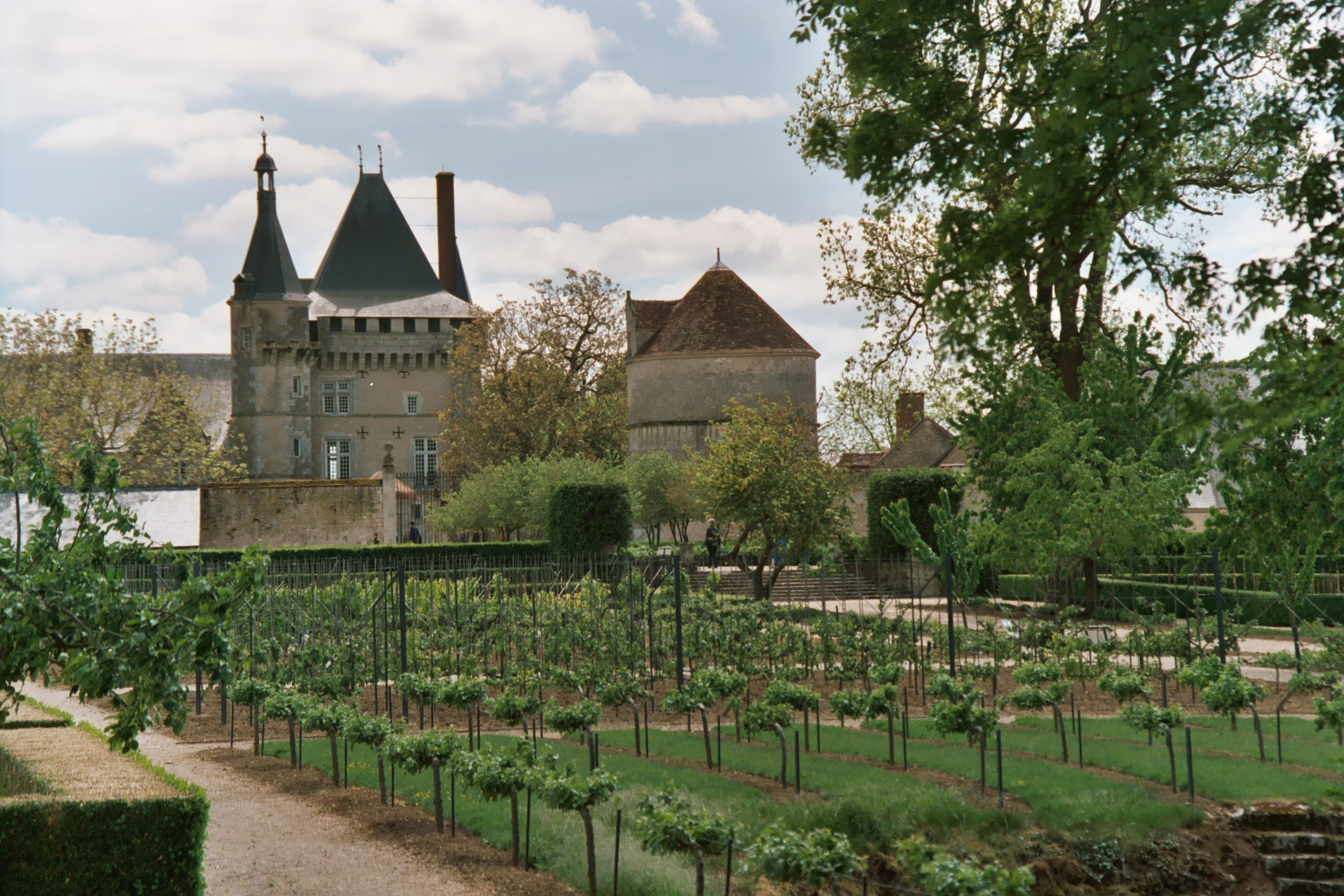
Kitchen garden at Talcy

- Cellettes – Garden of the Château de Beauregard. The Renaissance château features a Gallery of the Illustrious, 327 portraits of important personalities over three centuries. The contemporary garden, created by landscape architect Gilles Clément, is inspired by the gallery, and presents the colors, plant varieties and symbols of three centuries of gardens, in twelve different chambers of the garden.
- Sasnières – Garden of Plessis Sasnières. A private botanical and English garden in a small valley, around a pond. The flower gardens are organized on the theme of colors. Other features include, basins full of trout, Japanese primroses, and colorful bushes in bloom in the spring.
- Talcy – The Château de Talcy. Talcy is not a large château, but a Renaissance country house of the style typical to the Loire Valley. The garden is a recreation of an 18th-century fruit orchard, largely of pear and apple trees, including many old varieties, with the trees cultivated in a variety of ornamental shapes and forms.

=== Loiret ===
- Ingrannes – Arboretum des Grandes Bruyères. A contemporary arboretum of 12 hectares created within the forest of Orléans in 1968, inspired by the work of British landscape architect Gertrude Jekyll. The park features a topiary garden and a classic garden à la française; tunnels covered with rose and clematis; and 4500 plants from the temperate zones of Europe, North America and Asia.
- La Bussière – Garden of the Château de la Bussière. The garden adjoins a brick château built in the 17th century. The park was originally designed by André Le Nôtre, and restored in about 1911 by the landscape architect Édouard André. The park features a recreation of an 18th-century kitchen garden, enclosed by walls, with old varieties of vegetables and fruits; and a large French landscape garden, with a promenade beside a lake, and groves of old cedars, oaks, lindens trees and pourpres.

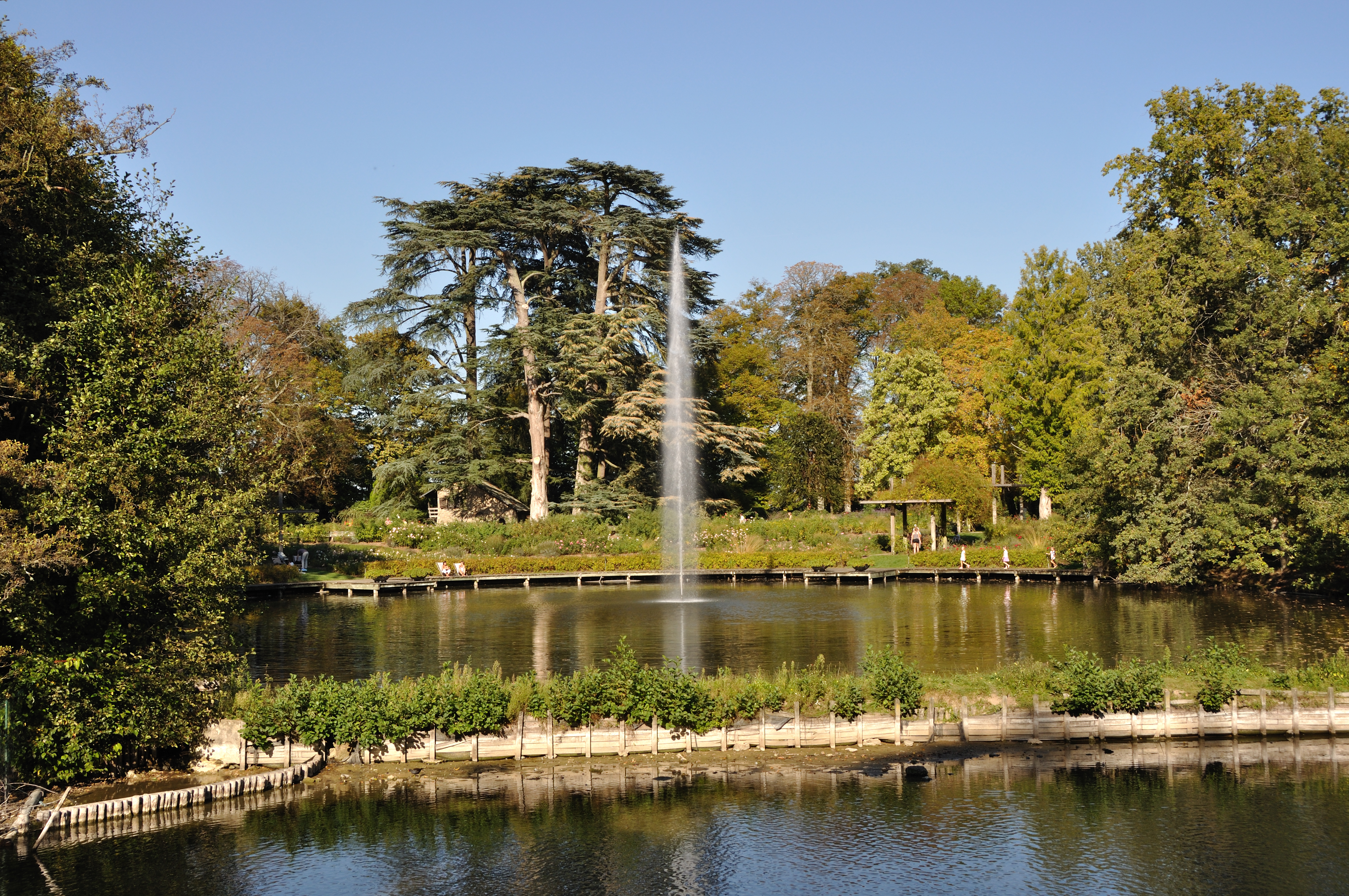
Fountains of the Parc Floral de la Source

- Meung-sur-Loire – The Arboretum des Prés des Culands, also called the Conservatoire National d'Ilex, is a two-hectare landscape garden created in 1987 in a marsh along the Loire River between Orléans and Blois. It is composed of small islands connected by wooden bridges, featuring trees, bushes, flowers, and aquatic and semi-aquatic plants from Europe, China and Japan. See Photos
- Nogent-sur-Vernisson – The Arboretum National des Barres. Formerly, the domain of the seed growers, the de Vilmorin family, the Arboretum has 35 hectares containing 2700 species of trees, bushes and plants, including a 46-meter high giant sequoia and 70 varieties of oak and other venerable trees.
- Orléans – Parc Floral de la Source at Orléans-la-Source. Source of the Loiret. Created as the site of the Floralies internationales d'Orléans in 1967 and the most visited attraction in the Loiret département
- Triguères – Gardens of the Manor of Grand Courtoiseau. Six hectares of French, Italian and exotic gardens surround the 17th-century manor of Grand Courtoiseau. Features include old varieties of roses, a topiary garden, and an avenue of three-century-old linden trees. See photos

== Gardens of Champagne-Ardenne ==
=== Aube ===
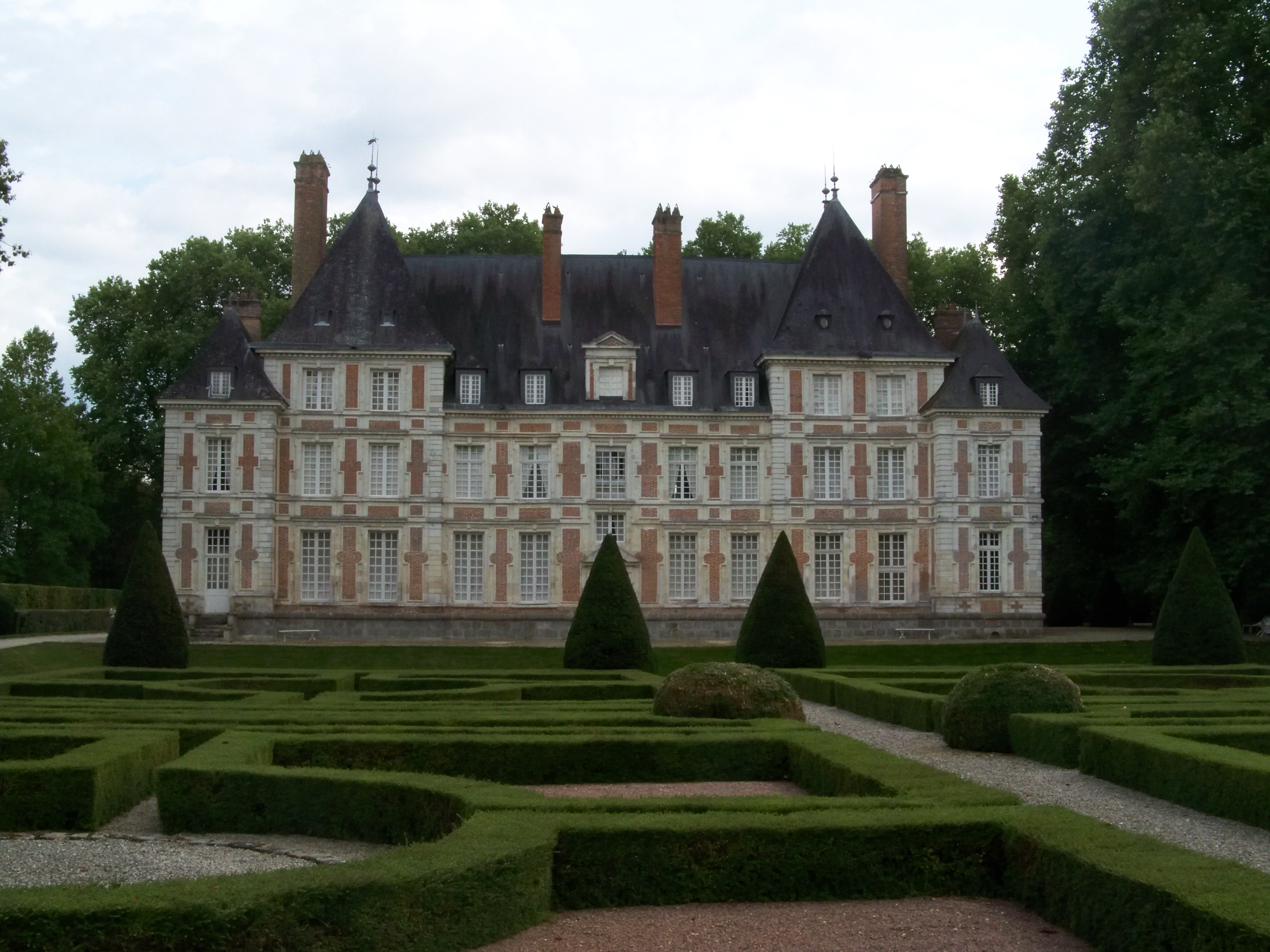
Garden of the Château de Barbery

- Barberey-Saint-Sulpice – Park and Garden of the Château de Barbery. The château was built in 1626 by Jean Ier de Mairat, in the Louis XIII style. The gardens were restored in 1965, and feature a French garden with hedges and topiary trees and hedges, and an English-style park with Italian poplars, lindens, Atlas cedar (Cedrus atlantica 'glauca'), American oaks, and Virginia tulip trees.(See photos)

=== Marne ===
- Nanteuil-la-Forêt – Jardin botanique de la Presle. A private botanical garden of two hectares created in 1998, featuring five hundred varieties of roses, and plants from North America, Europe and Asia.

(See photos)

- Sézanne – Entre Cour et Jardin. A private garden surrounding an 18th-century residence in the vineyards of Champagne which once belonged to the Marquise de la Forge. The garden in the French classic style features sculpted hedges and bushes, fountains, and a colorful variety of seasonal flowers.

(see Photos)

=== Haute-Marne ===
- Thonnance-lès-Joinville (Haute-Marne) – Les Jardins de mon Moulin. Located next to an old mill, this one-hectare garden features a rose garden with 500 rosebushes; a water garden; a garden of white flowers; and a recreation of a medieval garden.

(See Photos)

== Gardens of Franche-Comté ==
=== Jura ===
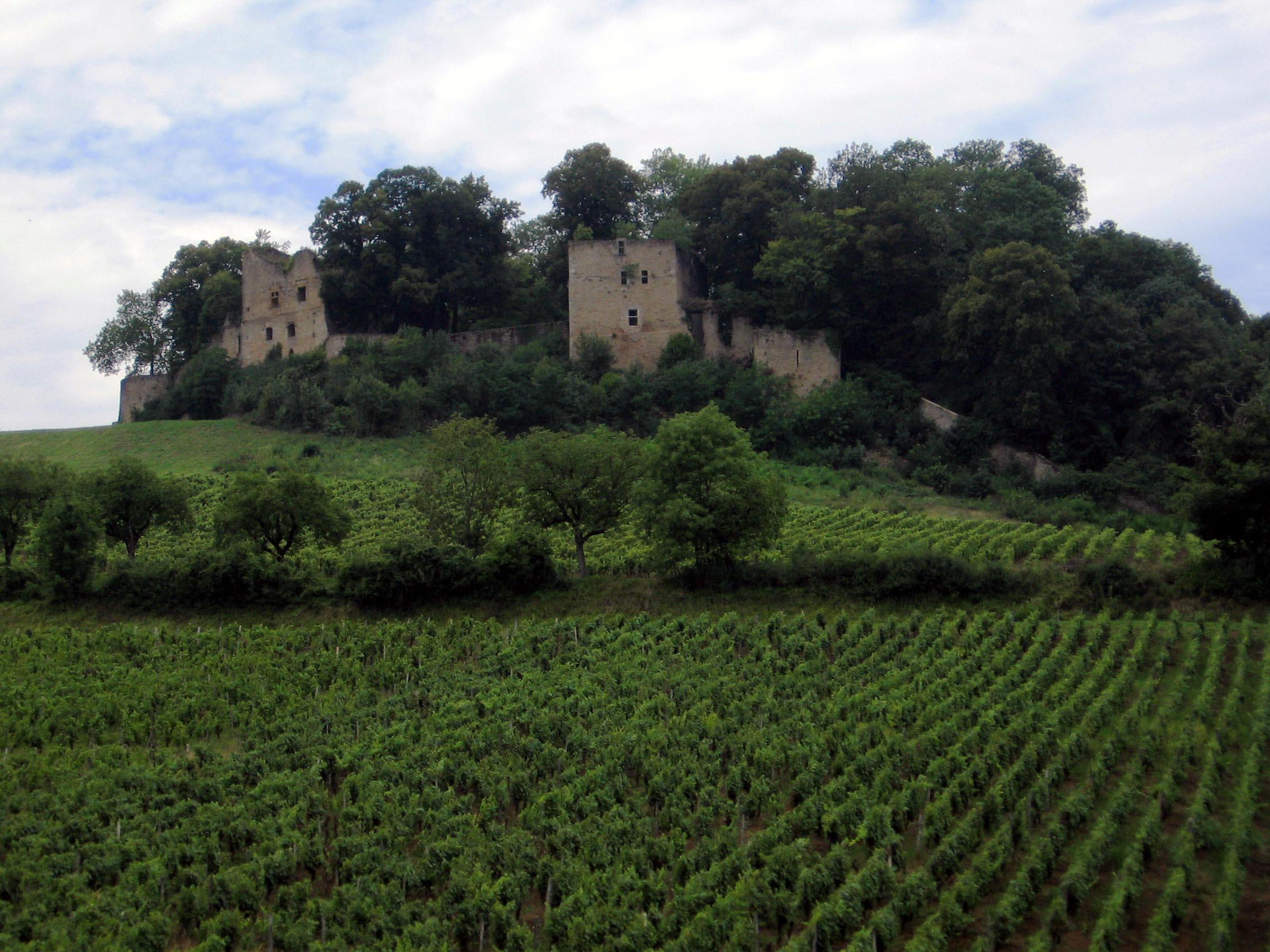
The Château d'Arlay

- Arlay – The Park and the "Garden of Games" of the Château d'Arlay. The pre-romantic park was created in 1780, around the ruins of a château which had belonged to the lords of Chalon-Arlay, princes of the House of Orange. An avenue of linden trees leads to a hill where the ruins of the château overlook the vineyards. In 1996, the Garden of Games was created beside the château, with a bowling green, cascades of plants and flower gardens illustrating the theme of amusement.
- Dole – Le Jardin à la Faulx. A contemporary private garden of one hectare, begun in 1983, devoted to the harmony of textures, colors, and compositions of both native and rare flowers, trees and bushes.

(see pictures)

=== Haute-Saône ===
- Battrans – Parc de l'Étang. A private arboretum of three hectares beside a pond, with 350 varieties of trees, bushes and flowers, created beginning in 1972.

(see photos)

=== Territoire-de-Belfort ===
- Anjoutey – Roseraie du Châtelet. A private contemporary arboretum begun in 1990, located in an old glacial valley, featuring six hundred varieties of roses and a water garden with sixty-five types of bamboo.

(See Pictures)

== Gardens of the Île-de-France ==
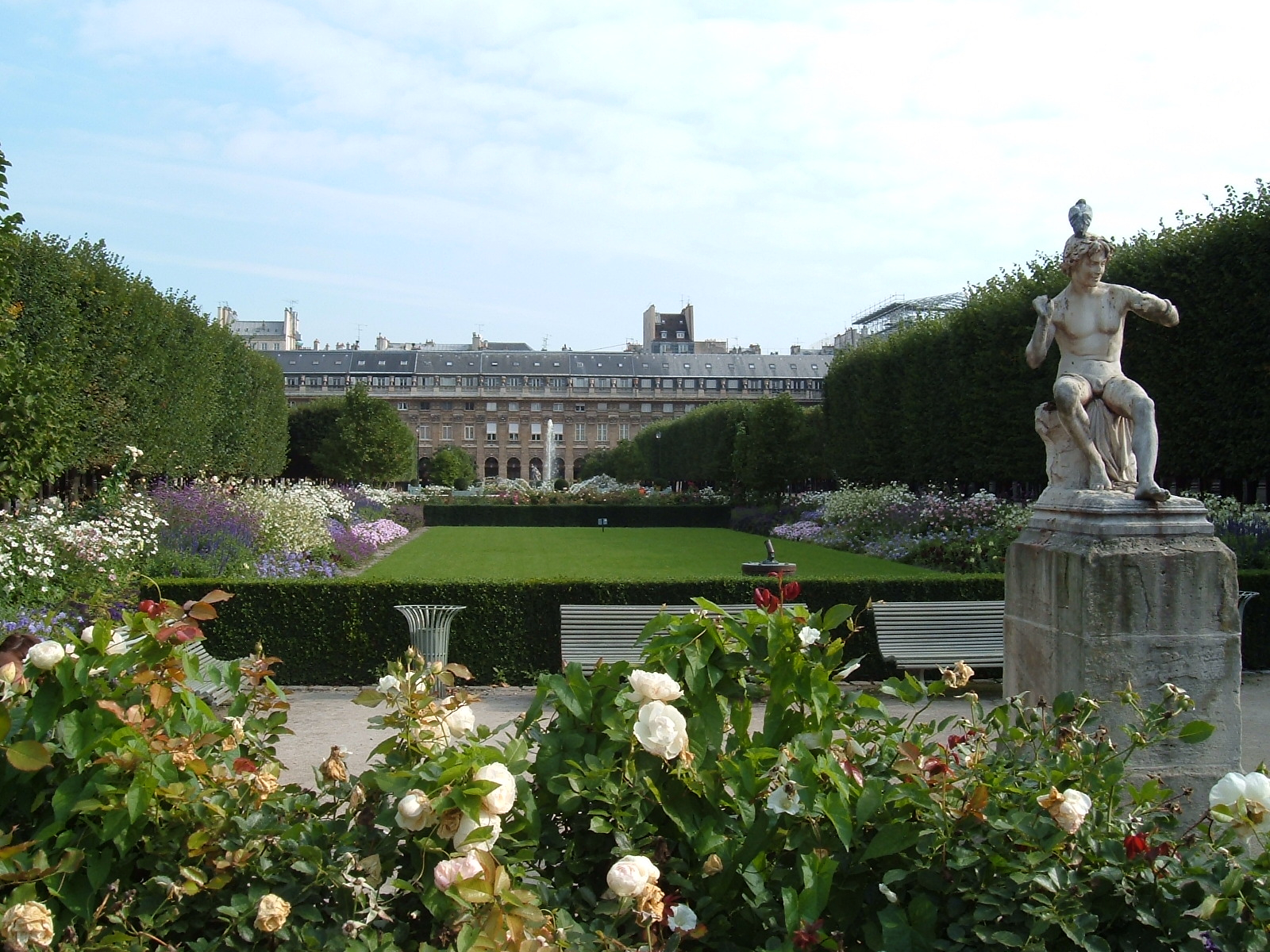
Garden of the Palais-Royal, Paris

=== Paris ===
- Paris – The Garden of the Palais-Royal. The Palais-Royal was the residence of Cardinal Richelieu in the 17th century until his death in 1642. It was then the residence of the young King Louis XIV and his brother, then of the Orléans family, until the French Revolution, when it was confiscated in 1793. The garden was created in 1731 by the architect Victor Louis and renovated in 1992 by landscape architect Mark Rudkin, who added new promenades and spaces for contemplation. The courtyard of columns designed by Daniel Buren was installed in 1986. (see photos)
- Coulée verte René-Dumont – This linear park is a 4.7 km (2.9 mile) green belt created on top of 19th-century railroad infrastructure. Beginning just east of the Opera Bastille, it rests on top of a brick viaduc that rises 10 meters above street level. The promeneur encounters reflecting pools, statuary, pedestrian bridges and densely planted parcels of perennials. This project was one of the first in the world (if not the first) to re-purpose an elevated railway line as an urban garden. The re-purposing was initiated under President François Mitterrand as part of a broader plan to enhance neighbourhoods in the east of Paris. It was inaugurated in 1993.
- Tuileries Garden –This is a public garden located between the Louvre and the Place de la Concorde in the 1st arrondissement of Paris, France. Created by Catherine de' Medici as the garden of the Tuileries Palace in 1564, it was opened to the public in 1667 and became a public park after the French Revolution. In the 19th, 20th, and 21st centuries, Parisians have used it to celebrate, meet up, stroll and relax.

=== Seine-et-Marne ===
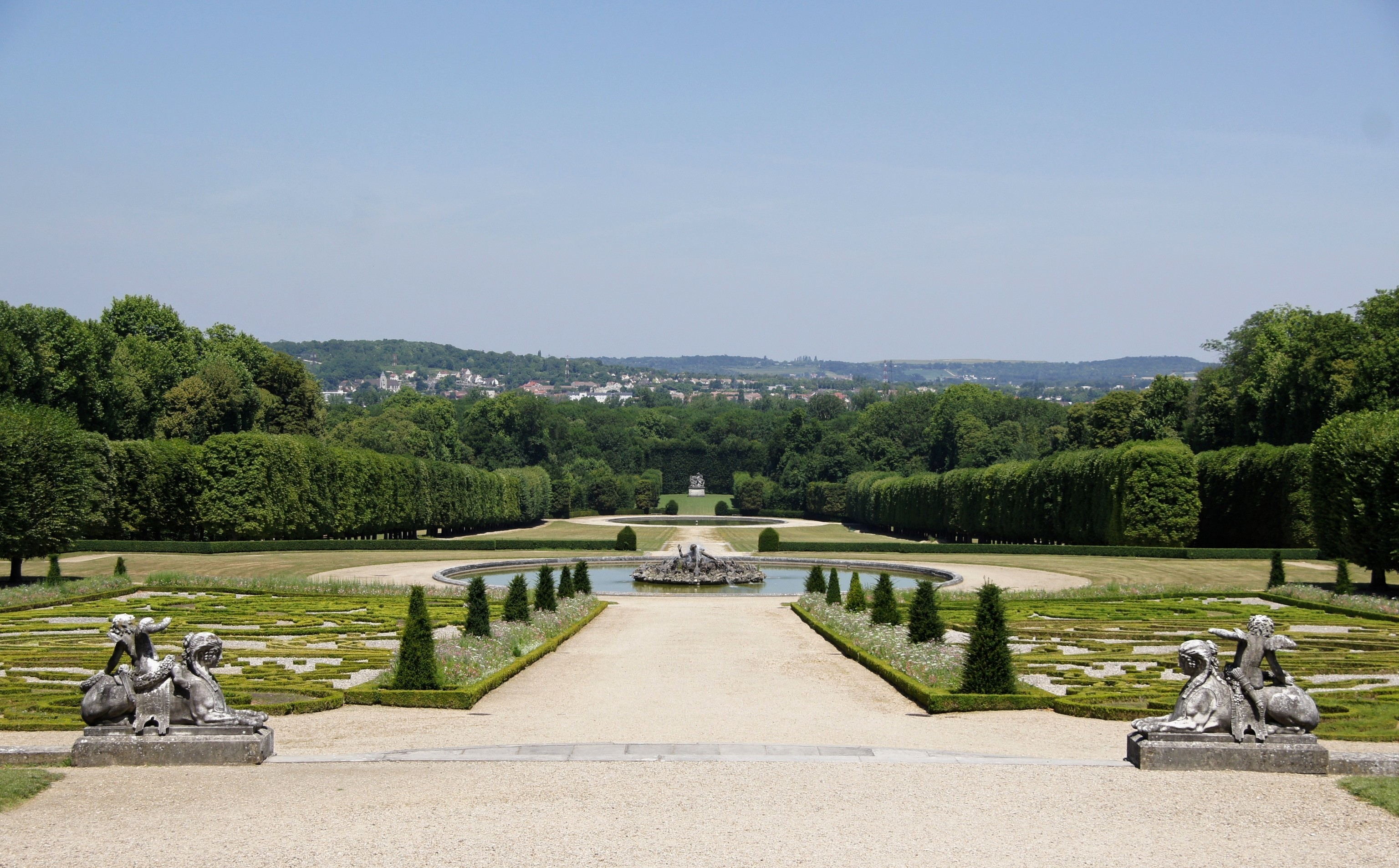
Château de Champs-sur-Marne gardens

- Champs-sur-Marne – Garden of the Château de Champs-sur-Marne. The château and gardens were created in 1703, in the reign of Louis XIV, by a businessman, Monsieur Bourvallais, who commissioned Claude Desgots, grandnephew of André Le Nôtre, to design a classical garden with a grand perspective of the Marne Valley. In 1739, it became the property of the duc de La Vallière, who had the garden modified by Garnier d'Isle. During the French Revolution the garden was abandoned and used to grow vegetables. In 1801, the park was inherited by the duc de Lévis, who combined it with the park of a neighboring estate and laid out an English-style park, with meadows, groves of trees and winding alleys. In 1895, it was purchased by the Count Louis Cahen d'Anvers, who commissioned landscape architects Achille Duchêne and Heni Duchêne to recreate the original garden à la française. (see photos)

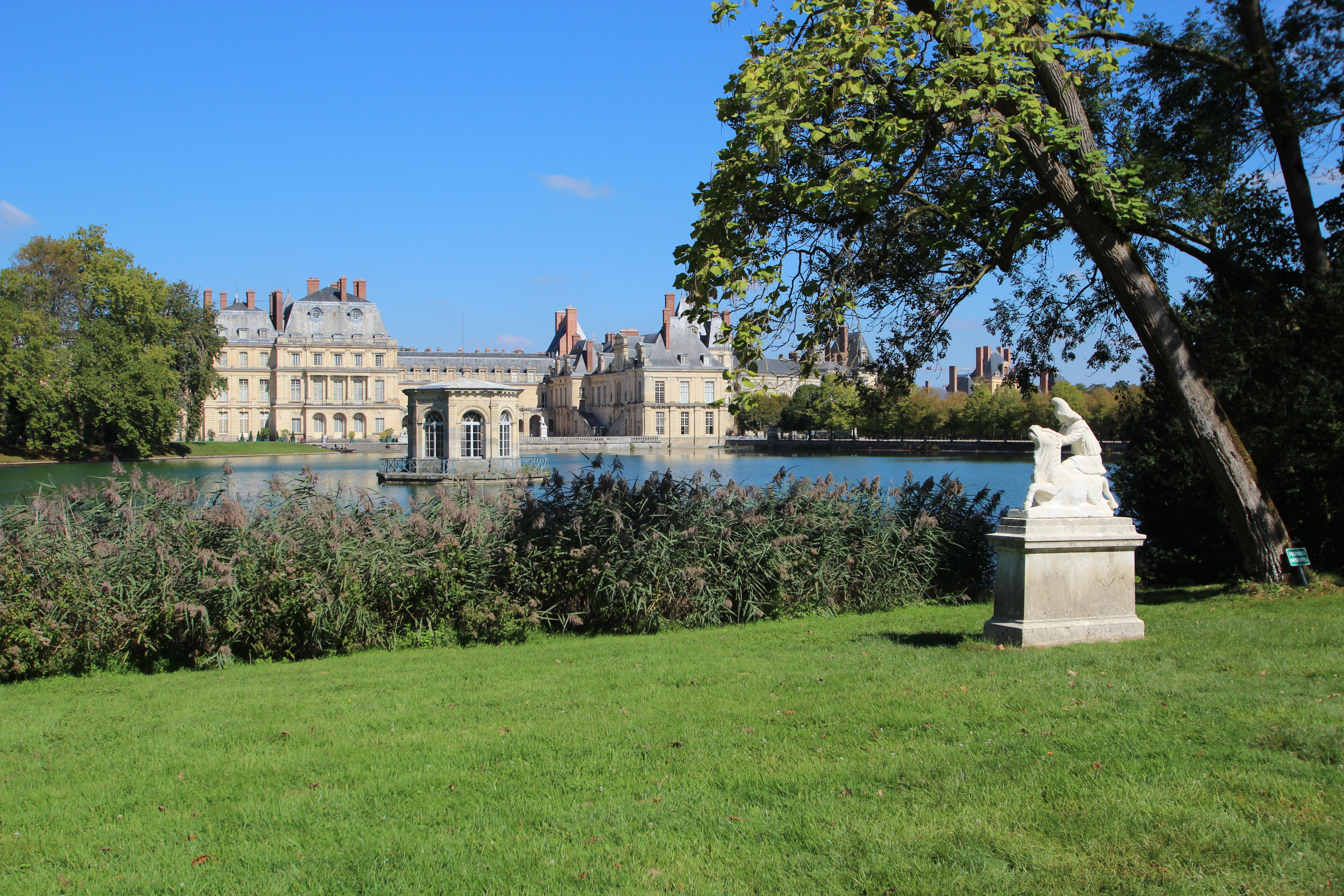
Gardens of the Château de Fontainebleau

- Fontainebleau – Gardens of the Château de Fontainebleau. The park of the royal residence, covering 130 hectares, is one of the largest and most famous landscape gardens in France. East of the palace is the forest and a 1200 meter long canal created by Henry IV of France. Near the palace is the Grand Parterre, a garden à la française created for Louis XIV, decorated with two large basins, one square and the other circular. Nearby is the Garden of Diane, which was the garden of the Queen, with the fountain of Diane in the center; a pavilion created for King Louis XV of France by the architect Louis Le Vau; and the English garden, created at the time of Napoleon I, crossed by a river, with a large pond and a collection of ornamental sculpture.

(See photos)

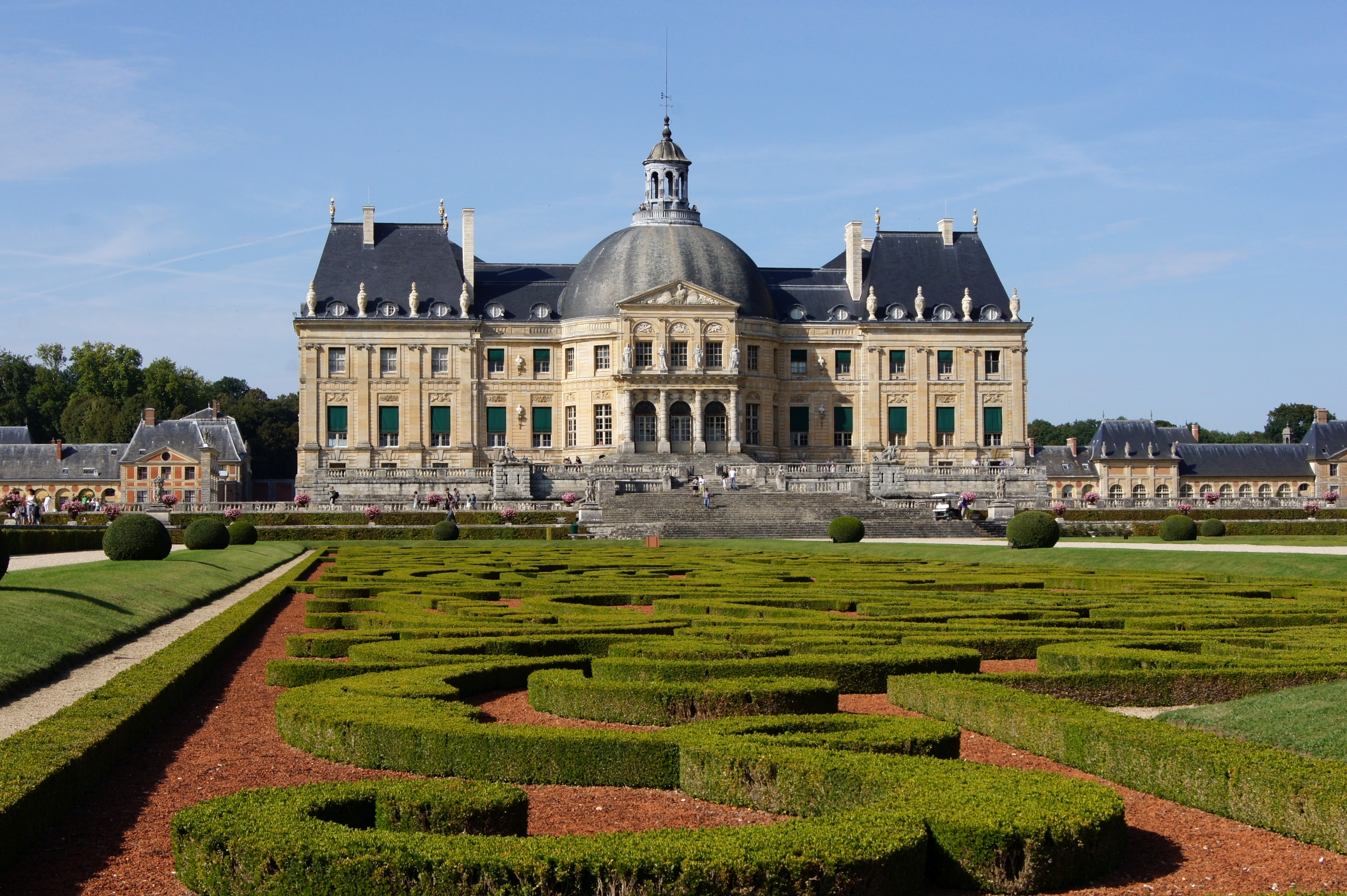
Garden of Vaux-le-Vicomte today

- Maincy – The Park of the Château de Vaux-le-Vicomte was the garden that inspired the gardens of Versailles. The 40 hectares of terraces and fountains were created by André Le Nôtre, working with Louis Le Vau, the architect of the château, for Nicolas Fouquet (1615–1680), the surintendant of finances of Louis XIV. The distance from the gate to the statue of Hercules is 1500 meters, and the carefully ordered perspective from the castle is three kilometers long. The magnificence of the gardens and their opening festivities inspired the envy and anger of Louis XIV, who fifteen days later had Fouquet arrested and imprisoned for the rest of his life.

(see photos)

=== Yvelines ===
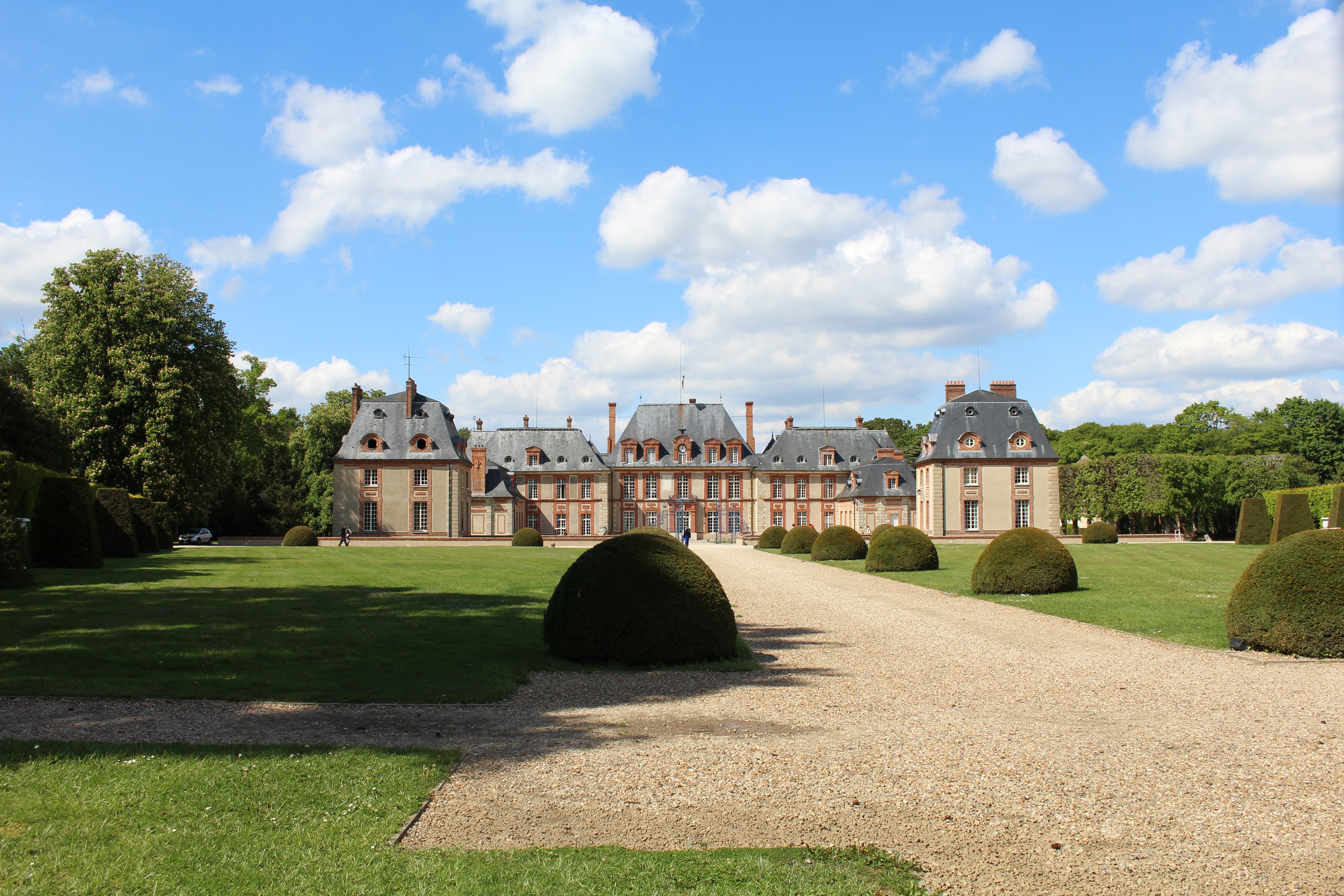
Park of the Château de Breteuil

- Choisel – Park of the Château de Breteuil. A private park and garden of 75 hectares, surrounding the château. The French garden was begun in the 17th century, an English park added in the 18th century, and the French garden was redesigned in 1895 by the owner, Henri de Breteuil, and the landscape architect Achille Duchêne. Major features, including a labyrinth, were added since 1990 by the current owners, Henri-François and Séverine de Breteuil.

See photos

- Rambouillet – Domaine national. The Château of Rambouillet is the summer residence of the Presidents of the French Republic, surrounded by 147 hectares of French and English-style gardens. The gardens are open to the public when the French President is not in residence. The château began as a simple fortified manor house, purchased by a French knight, Jehan Bernier, in 1368. The avenues of the park led directly into the renowned game-rich forest of Rambouillet. In 1783, it was purchased by King Louis XVI whose wife, Queen Marie Antoinette, referred to the château as a "gothic toadhouse" (fr: gothique crapaudière). Her husband had an elegant dairy built for her in the park, with milk pails made of Sèvres porcelain. The château and gardens became the property of the French State during the French Revolution. Emperor Napoleon I stayed there several times, the last time on the night of 29–30 June 1815, on his way to exile on Saint Helena. In 1810, Napoleon created an avenue of bald cypress trees (Taxodium distichum). During the hurricane that ravaged the northern half of France on 26 December 1999, the park lost nearly five thousand trees, including the handsome avenue of bald cypresses.
- Saint-Germain-en-Laye – The Domaine National of the Château de Saint-Germain-en-Laye was originally the site of a castle of King Louis VI (Louis Le Gros). A chapel was added by Louis IX of France in 1238. The present château was built by Pierre de Chambiges in 1537. It became a residence of the kings of France until 1682, when Louis XIV moved his residence to Versailles. Today the château contains the Musée d'Archéologie nationale (French National Museum of Archeology). The park was created by Le Nôtre in 1663. He added a grand terrace overlooking the valley of the Seine in 1669. In 1845, the landscape garden was added by Loaisel de Treogate.

See photos

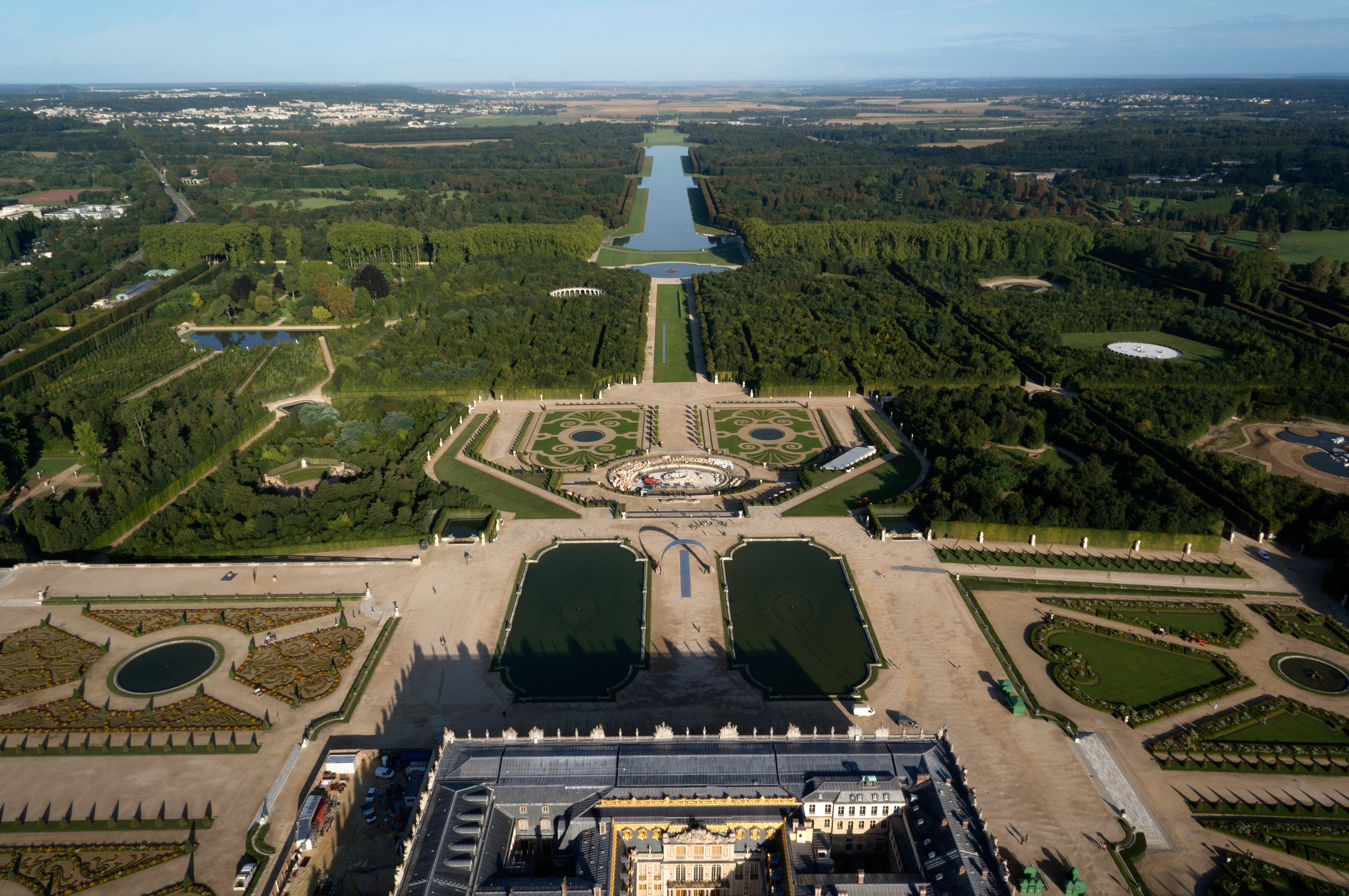
Aerial view of the Gardens of Versailles

- Versailles – The Gardens of Versailles (850 hectares), created by André Le Nôtre for Louis XIV between 1661 and 1700, are the best-known and most visited gardens in France, and a UNESCO World Heritage Site.
- Versailles – The Potager du roi, the kitchen gardens of King Louis XIV, located near the Château of Versailles, were originally created between 1678 and 1683 by Jean Baptiste de la Quintinie at the request of Louis XIV, on a swampy section of 9 hectares called the "stinking pond." They were composed of thirty different walled gardens and orchards producing fruit and vegetables for the Court. Today the gardens belong to the National Higher School of Landscape Architecture (Fr: École Nationale Supérieure du Paysage). Twelve gardens remain, with 5000 fruit trees belonging to 350 different varieties, plus a wide variety of vegetables and other plants.

See photos

- Thoiry -The Château de Thoiry (450 hectares) and its gardens are privately owned by Annabelle and Paul de la Panouse. They were originally created in the 16th century by alchemist Raoul Moreau. The gardens were built as a setting for the château, designed by Philibert de l'Orme, They were redone 150 years later by landscape architect Claude Desgot, the nephew of André Le Nôtre, who included optical illusions in the perspectives of the long axes, making distances seem greater. In the 19th century, an English landscape garden was added, including 51 giant sequoias planted in 1852, which obscured many of the original perspectives. Masses of rhododendron and azalea bushes were also added for color. In the 1970s, the owners restored the original axes of the park, and added modern features, including a new labyrinth by Adrian Fisher; an autumn garden by Timothy Vaughn; and a floral border by Alain Richert.

See photos

- Montfort L'Amaury. Gardens of the Château de Groussay. A contemporary garden, created between 1950 and 1970 by the French esthete Carlos de Beistegui (who owned the property since 1939). The garden was inspired by Anglo-Chinese gardens of the 18th century, and by the gardens of Swedish châteaux, and is decorated with follies, including a Chinese pagoda, a Tatar tent, and a théâtre de verdure. See photos

=== Essonne ===
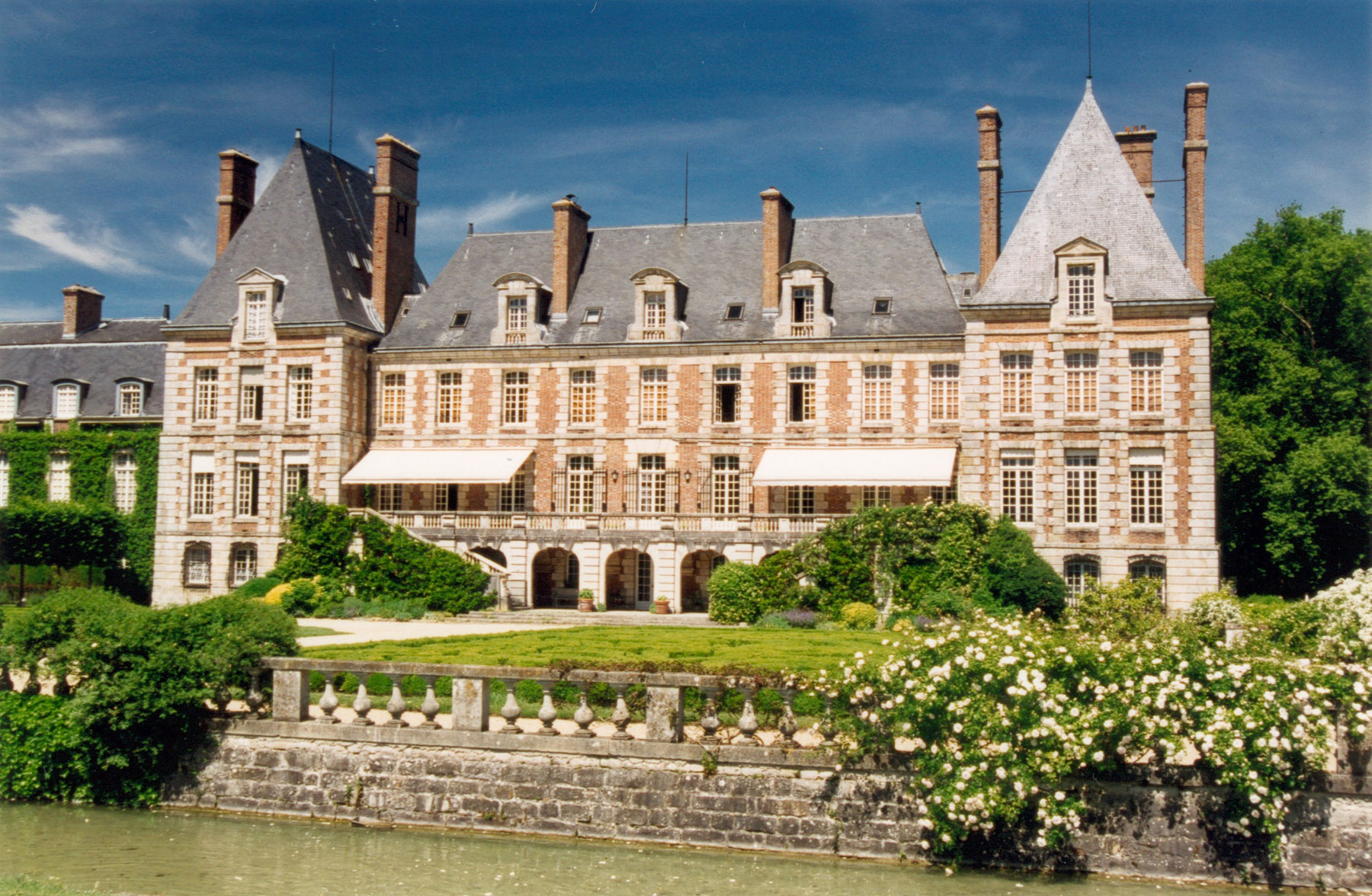
Château de Courances

- Chamarande – Château de Chamarande. The original Renaissance-style garden (1654) was enlarged between 1739 and 1763, and transformed into a French landscape garden in the 1780s.

(See photos)

- Courances – The Park of the Château de Courances. 17th-century water garden and Garden à la française. In 1870 landscape architect Achille Duchêne restored the formal garden and added a French landscape garden. The château dates to Louis XIII.(See photos)
- Courson-Monteloup – Château de Courson. The house and formal French park dates to 1680, the French landscape garden to 1820.

(see photos)

- Saint-Jean-de-Beauregard – Domaine de Saint-Jean-de-Beauregard. A 17th-century floral and kitchen garden, enclosed by walls, along with a Garden à la française and a French landscape garden. (See photos)

=== Hauts-de-Seine ===
- Châtenay-Malabry – Arboretum de la Vallée-aux-Loups. A public French landscape garden, botanical garden and arboretum, created at the end of the 18th century by the chevalier de Bignon. Later, Charles-Louis Cadet de Gassicourt, the pharmacist of Napoleon, added a garden of rare plants. The arboretum was enlarged in the 19th century, and now has 500 types of trees and bushes. The park adjoins the park and residence of the writer Chateaubriand.

See photos

- Rueil-Malmaison – The Gardens of the Château de Malmaison, the residence of Joséphine de Beauharnais who bought the manor house in April 1799 for herself and her husband, General Napoléon Bonaparte, the future Emperor.
- Saint-Cloud – The French landscape garden, Parc de Saint-Cloud of the Château de Saint-Cloud, a royal residence destroyed during the Franco-Prussian War of 1870.
- Sceaux – The Park of the Château de Sceaux. The vestiges of the formal French-style gardens designed by André Le Nôtre for Jean-Baptiste Colbert, Louis XIV's minister of finance, who purchased the domaine in 1670.

=== Val d'Oise ===
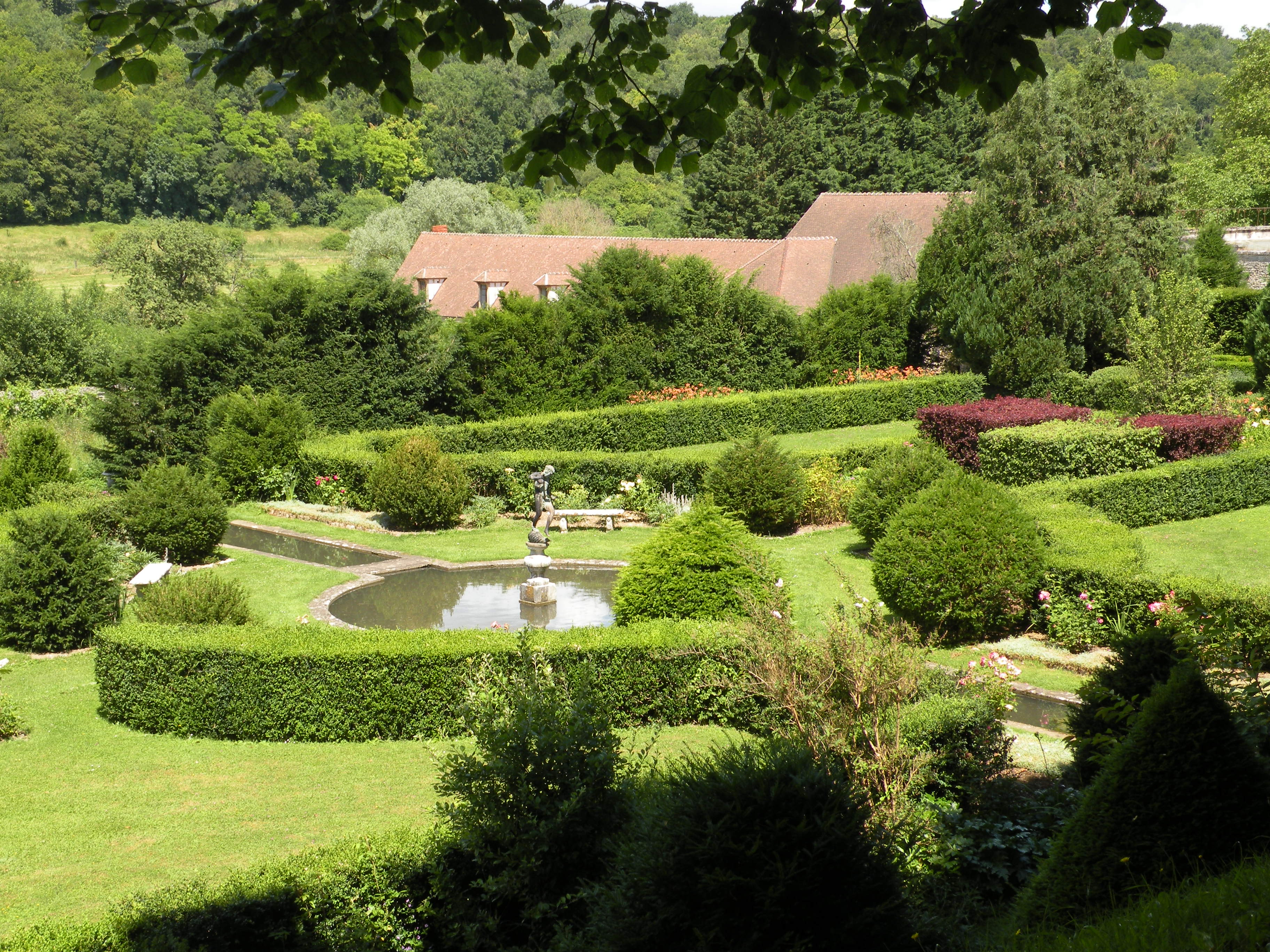
Gardens of the Château d'Ambleville

- Ambleville. The Gardens of the Château d'Ambleville. (4 hectares). A private garden, inspired by the gardens of the Italian Renaissance. The three terraces are composed into a garden of the moon, a garden of black and white tulips, and a garden inspired by the painting of Mantegna, Triumph of the Virtues.
- Asnières-sur-Oise – Park of the Royaumont Abbey. The Abbey was built by Louis IX in the 13th century, and destroyed during the French Revolution. The cloister garden was restored by Achille Duchêne in 1912, and the medieval herb and vegetable garden, between the kitchen and the refectory, was recreated in 2004 based on the writings of the Benedictine Abbesse Saint Hildegard van Bingen (1098–1179).

see photos

- Chaussy – Domaine of Villarceaux (70 hectares). Public French garden, English garden, botanical garden, and flower gardens. The water gardens date from the 17th century, the Louis XV château from the 18th century. The 18th-century garden has a rare vertugadin, in the shape of a woman's basket skirt of the 18th century, surrounded by eighteen statues from Italy.

See photos

== Gardens of Languedoc-Roussillon ==
=== Gard ===
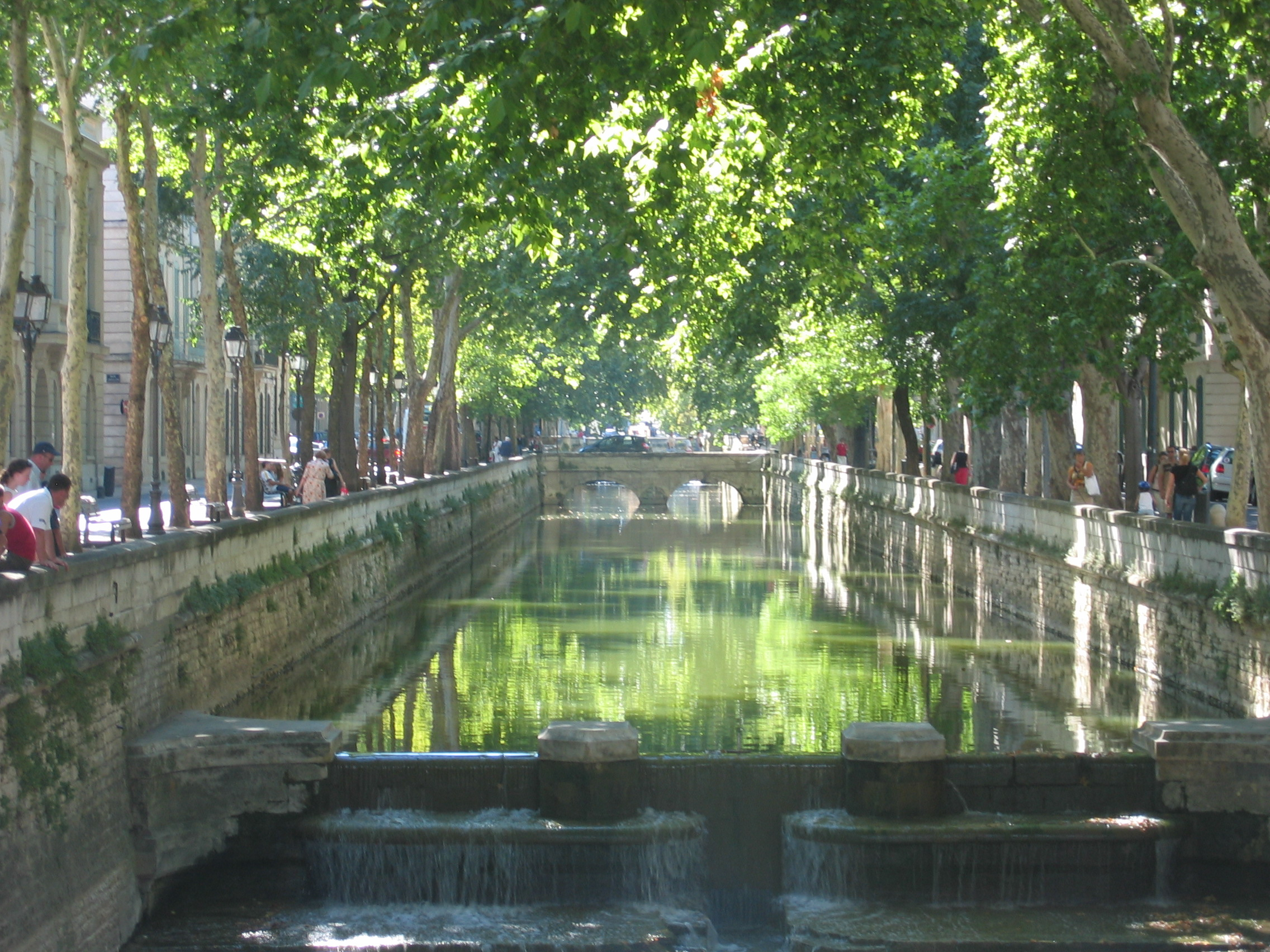
Le Jardin de la Fontaine, Nîmes.

- Montaren – Le Jardin du Temple. A collection of fourteen traditional walled gardens with the flowers and vegetables of the region. (see pictures and description)
- Générargues – the Bamboo Garden of Prafance is a private botanical garden, created in 1856, with one of Europe's oldest and largest collections of bamboos.
- Nîmes – Jardin de la Fontaine. A public park with a water garden and garden à la française created in 1738–1755 around a spring which provided water to the city since Roman times. It was one of the first public gardens in France. (see details)
- Ponteils-et-Brésis – Jardin du Mas de l'Albri. A small private English landscape garden and flower garden in a picturesque high valley of the Cèze, with collections of roses and aquatic plants. (see picture and description)
- Saint-André-de-Majencoules – The Garden of Sambucs. A small private floral and water garden. (see details)

=== Hérault ===
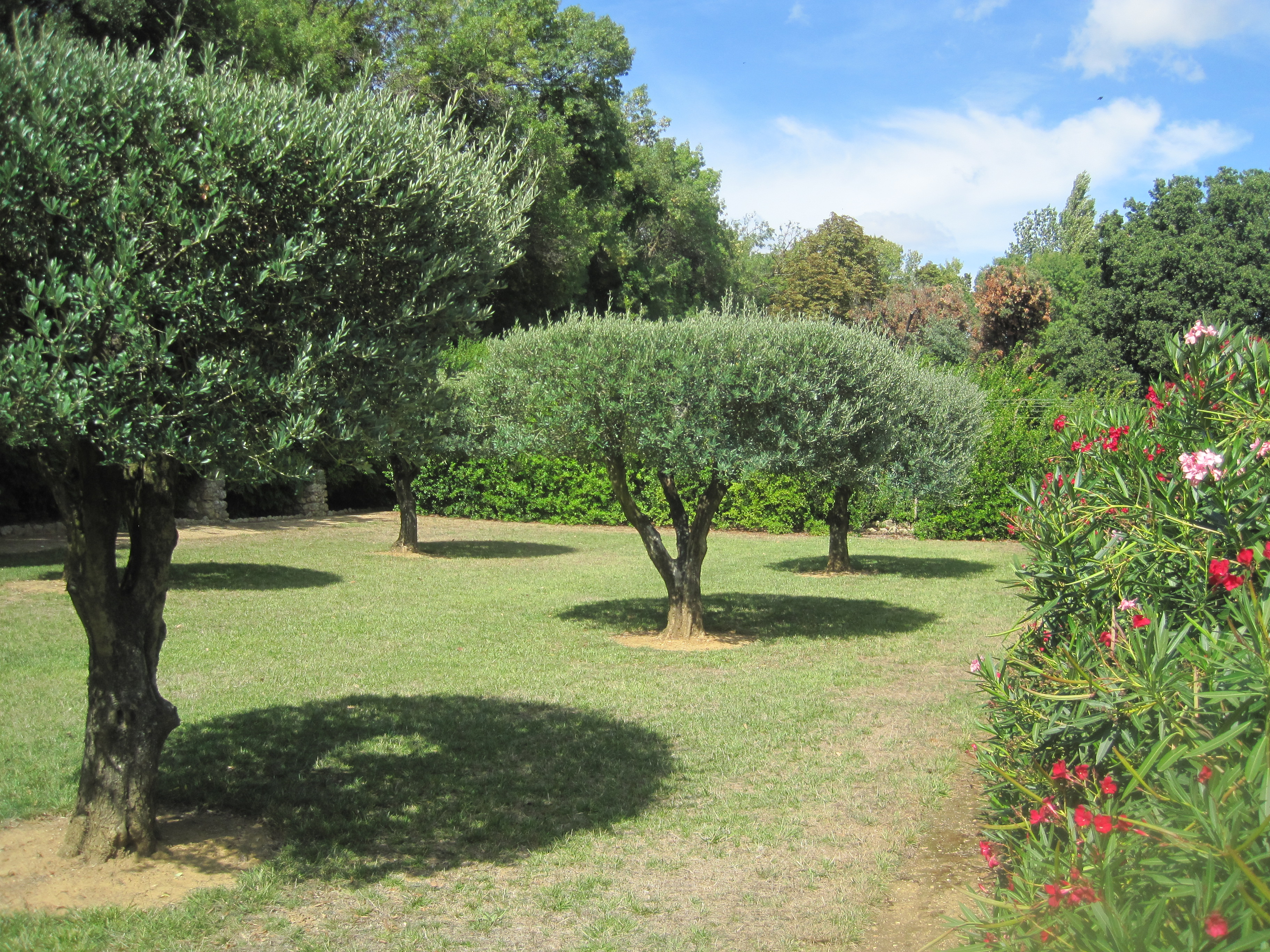
Château de Margon, Hérault

- Margon – The Park and Garden of the Château de Margon. The château dates to the 15th century, with additions made in the 16th, 17th and 18th century. The park and terraces are open to the public.
- Montpellier – The Park and Gardens of Flaugergues. An 18th-century château and garden à la française, a 19th-century landscape park, and a botanical garden.

(photos and more information)

- Servian – Jardin des Carrières de Saint-Adrien (Garden of the Quarries of Saint-Adrien). A modern private botanical garden located in a water-filled quarry from the Middle Ages. (pictures and description)

== Gardens of Limousin ==
=== Corrèze ===
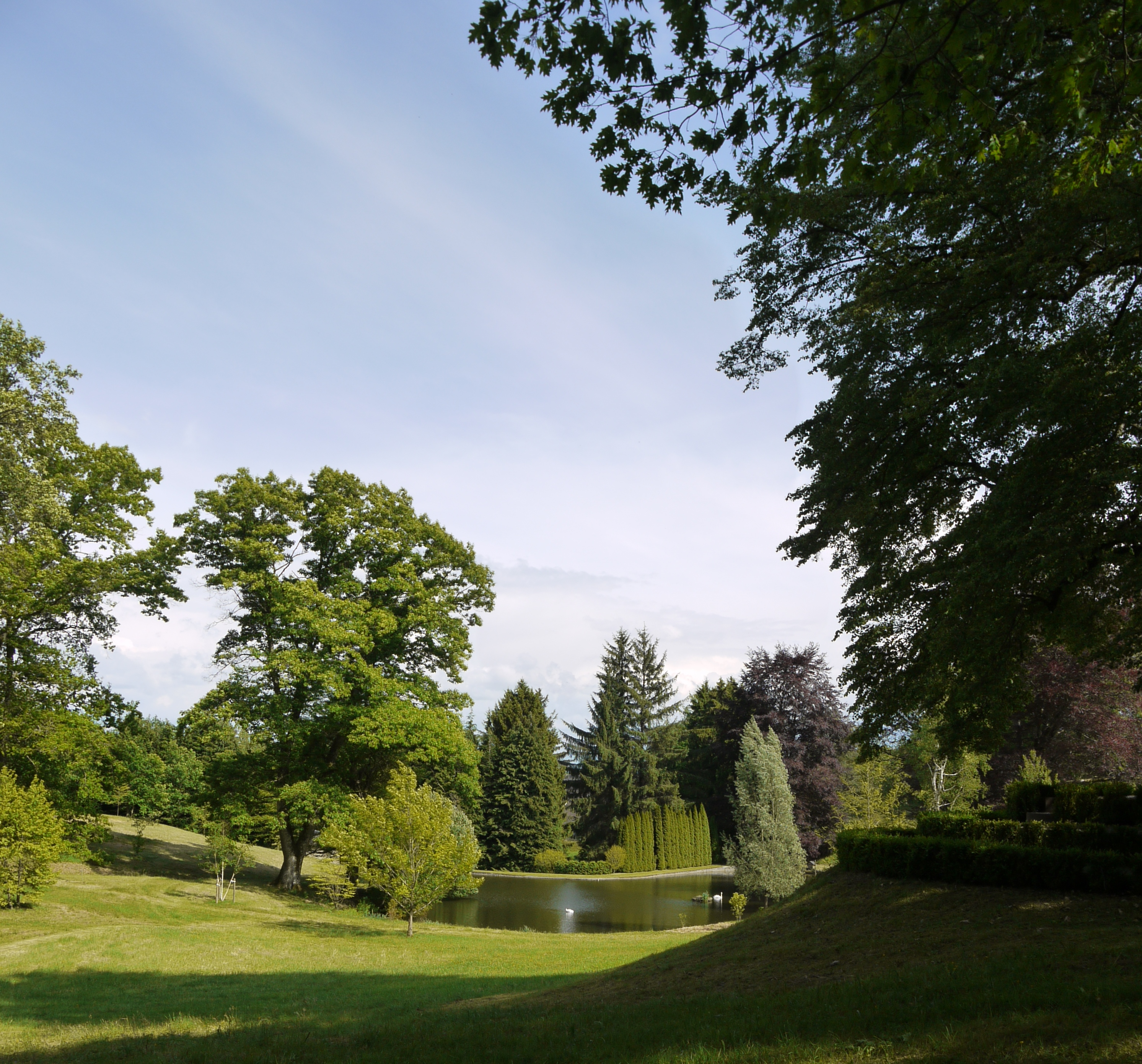
Arboretum of the Château de Neuvic d'Ussel

- Château du Saillant in Voutezac
- Arboretum du château de Neuvic d'Ussel in Neuvic An historical garden created by Jean-Hyacinthe d'Ussel around 1815. This place is also labelled by the A.R.B.R.E.S "Arbres remarquables de France" for his collection of huges trees : one of the largest French sequoia, tilia cordata...

=== Creuse ===
- Arboretum de la Sédelle in Crozant
- Jardins Clos de la forge in Crozant

=== Haute-Vienne ===
- Château de Montméry in Ambazac
- Jardin de Liliane in Saint-Laurent-sur-Gorre

== Gardens of Lorraine ==
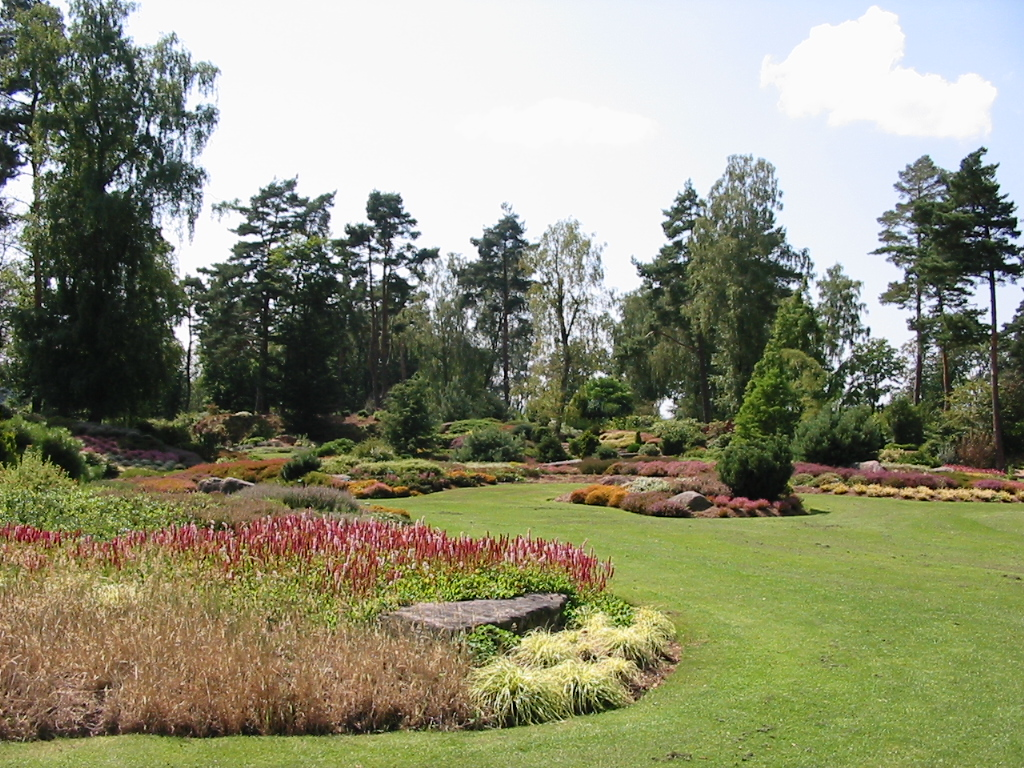
Jardins de Callunes, specializing in heather

=== Meurthe-et-Moselle ===
- Château de Fléville in Fléville-devant-Nancy
- Château de Gerbéviller in Gerbéviller
- Jardin botanique du Montet in Villers-lès-Nancy –

=== Meuse ===
- Parc Gilles de Trèves in Ville-sur-Saulx
- Parc de la Varenne in Haironville

=== Moselle ===
- Pange, parc du château

=== Vosges ===
- Jardins de Callunes in Ban-de-Sapt
- Jardin d'altitude du Haut Chitelet in Xonrupt-Longemer

== Gardens of the Midi-Pyrénées ==
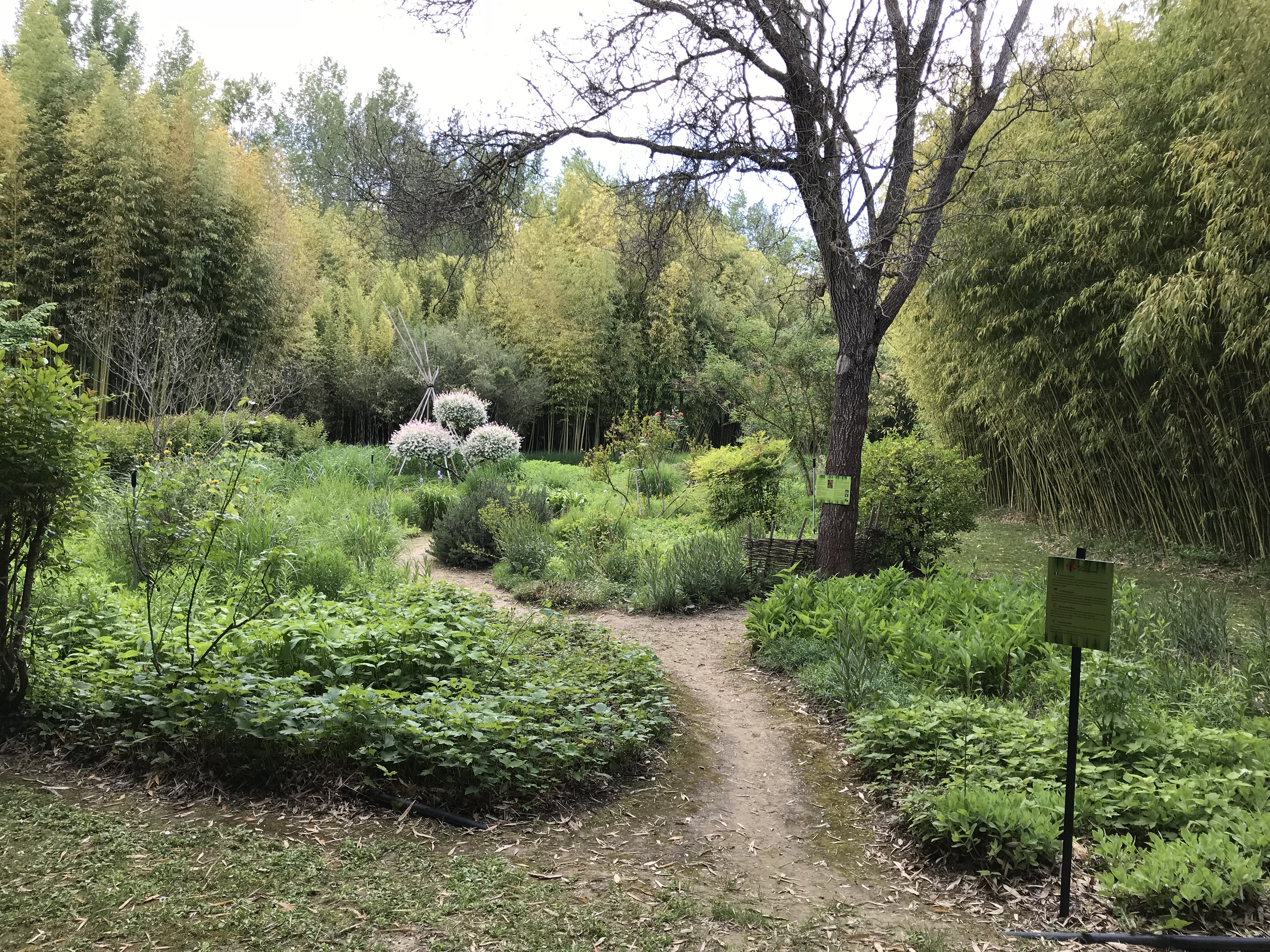
Parc aux Bambous

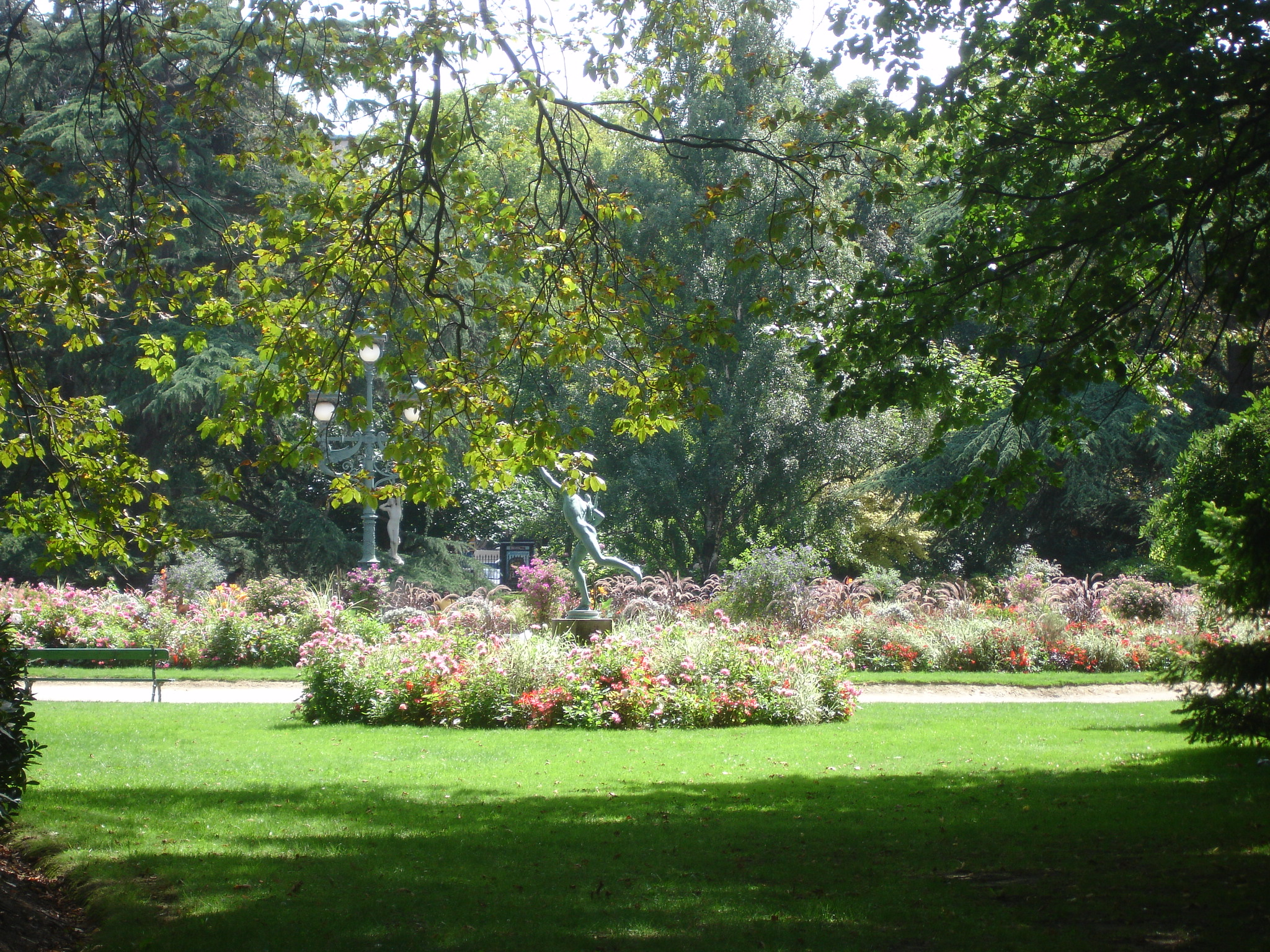
The Royal Garden of Toulouse

=== Ariège ===
- Lapenne – Broques – Parc aux Bambous

=== Aveyron ===
- Salles-la-Source – Garden of Eden of the Château du Colombier

=== Haute-Garonne ===
- Larra – Garden and park of the Château de Larra
- Loubens-Lauragais – Garden and park of the Château de Loubens
- Bagnères-de-Luchon – Hot springs park of Quinquonces
- Bagnères-de-Luchon – Park of the Casino and Arboretum de Jouéou
- Merville – Park of the Château
- Montréjeau – Gardens and park of the Château de Valmirande
- Toulouse – The Royal Garden
- Toulouse – Parc de la Reynerie
- Toulouse – The Japanese Garden in Compans-Caffarelli

=== Gers ===
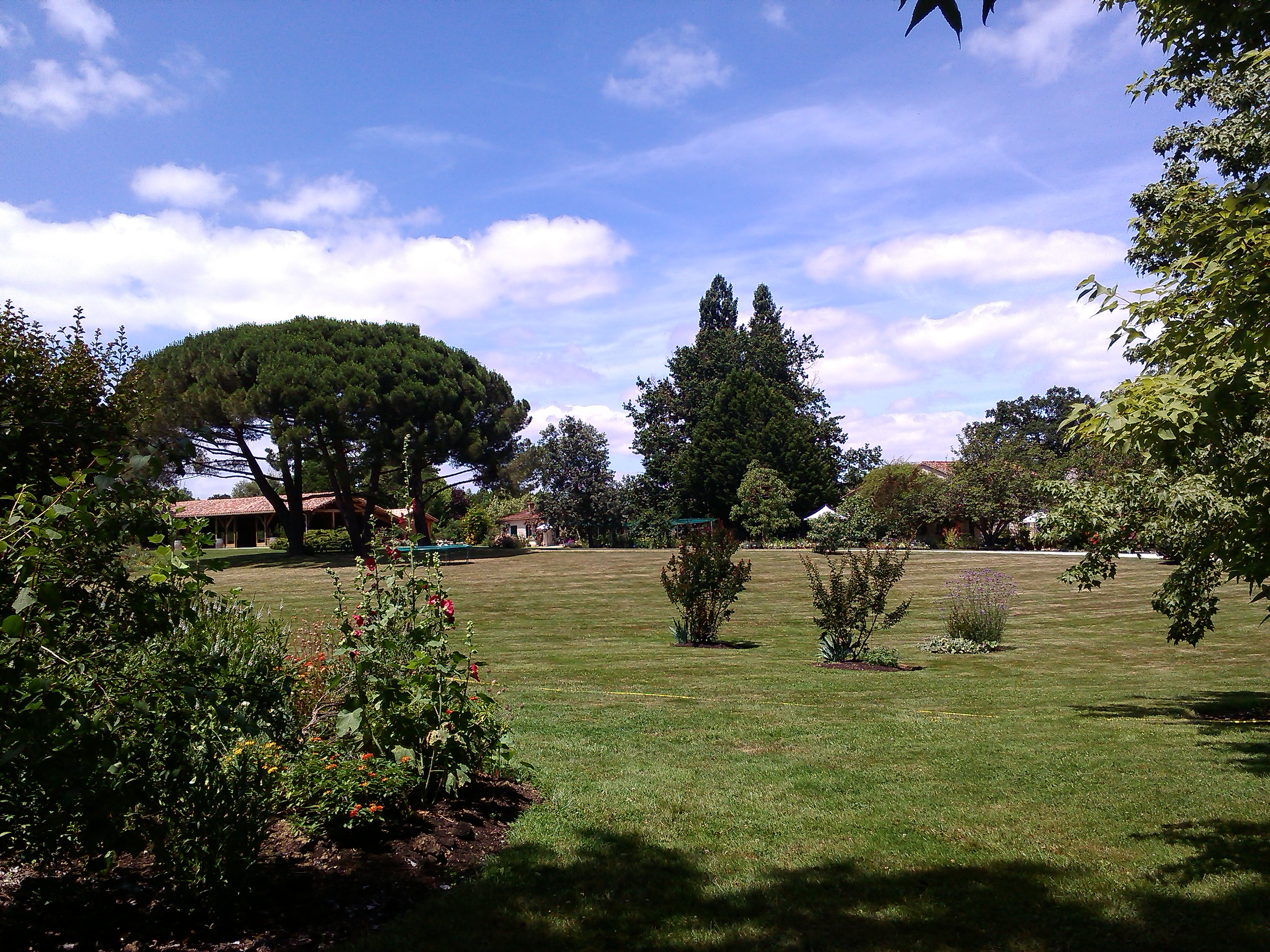
The Jardins de Coursiana

- Bétous – Palm garden of Sarthou
- La Romieu – Jardins de Coursiana

=== Lot ===
- Cahors – The Secret Gardens

=== Hautes-Pyrénées ===
- Tarbes – Jardin Massey
- Thermes-Magnoac – Les jardins de la Poterie Hillen

=== Tarn ===
- Castres – Garden of the Bishop
- Cordes-sur-Ciel – Jardin des Paradis
- Giroussens – Jardins des Martels

== Gardens of the Nord-Pas-de-Calais ==
=== Nord ===
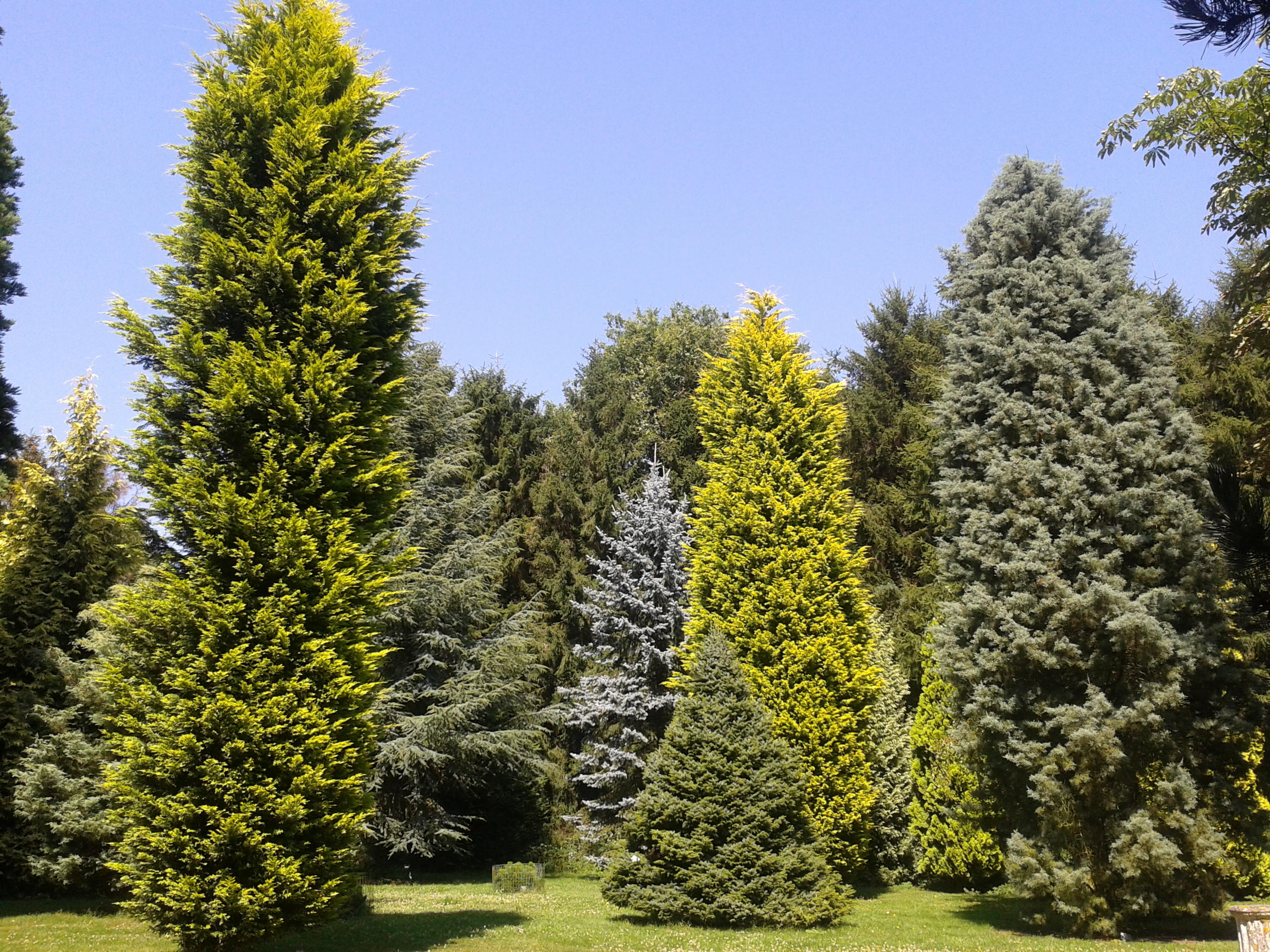
Parc Arboretum du Manoir aux Loups

- Cassel – The Farm of Mont des Récollets.
- Halluin – Parc Arboretum du Manoir aux Loups.
- Maroilles – The garden of Sylvie Fontaine.

=== Pas-de-Calais ===
- Chériennes – The garden of Lianes.
- Séricourt – Park of the Château de Sericourt.
- Le Touquet-Paris-Plage – The Channel gardens.

== Gardens of Lower Normandy ==
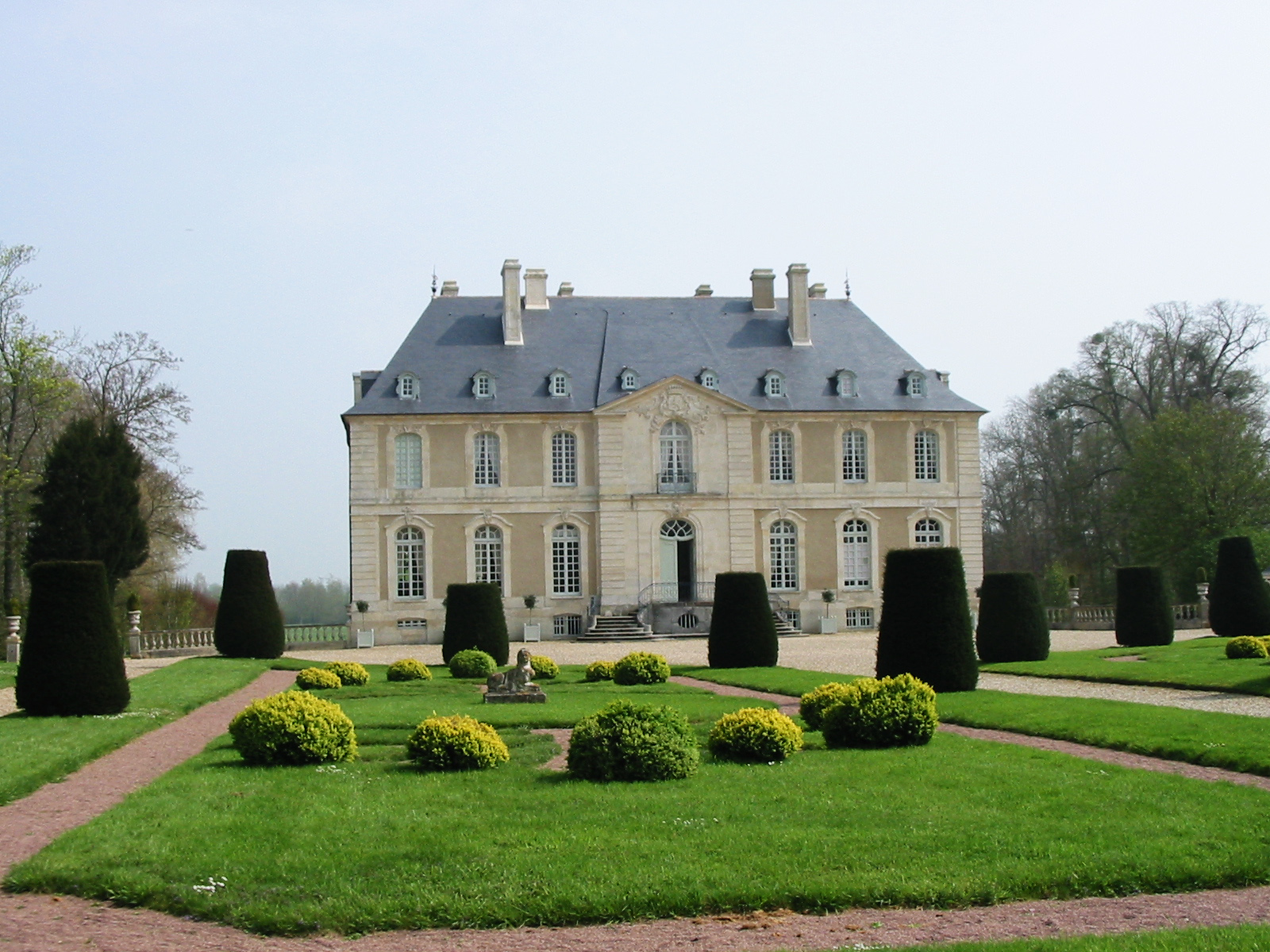
Château de Vendeuvre

=== Calvados ===
- Cambremer – Gardens of the Pays d'Auge.
- Castillon – Plantbessin.
- Mézidon-Canon – Canon.
- Ouilly-le-Vicomte – Boutemont.
- Saint-Gabriel-Brécy – Gardens of the Château de Brécy.
- Vendeuvre – Gardens of the Château de Vendeuvre

=== Manche ===
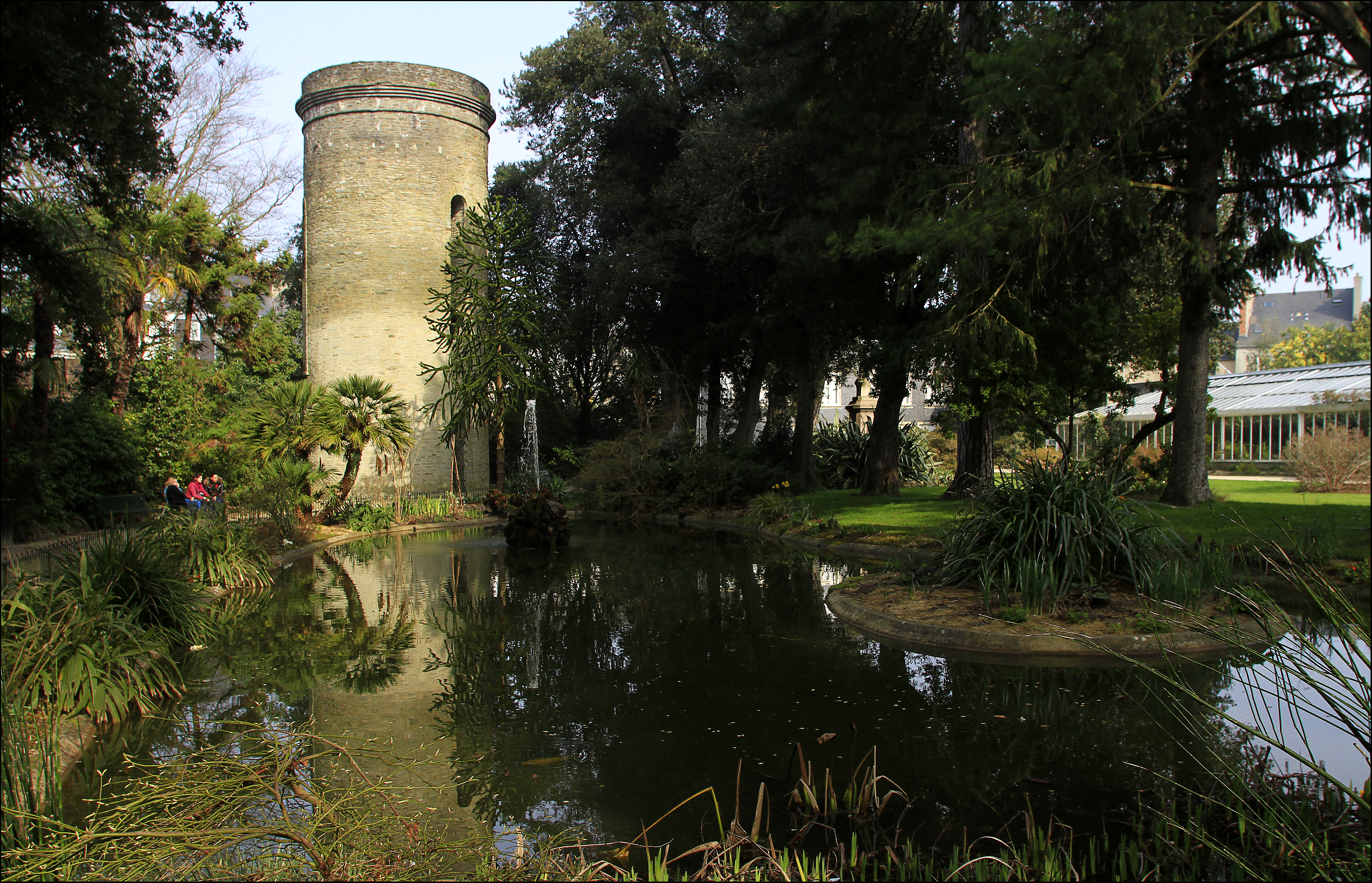
Park Emmanuel Liais

- Cherbourg-Octeville – Park Emmanuel Liais
- Martinvast – Château of Beaurepaire
- Saint-Germain-des-Vaux – Garden Jacques Prévert
- Saussey – Argences
- Tourlaville – Château des Ravalet
- Urville-Nacqueville – Château de Nacqueville
- Vauville – Château of Vauville

=== Orne ===
- Athis-Val de Rouvre - Jardin Intérieur à Ciel Ouvert
- Bagnoles-de-l'Orne - Jardin Retiré
- Le Champ-de-la-Pierre – Parc du Domaine
- Chemilli – The Montperthuis Gardens
- Val-au-Perche – Parc du Château de Lorière
- Perche en Nocé – Le Jardin François
- Rémalard en Perche – Jardin de ma petite Rochelle
- Boischampré – Sassy
- Sainte-Honorine-la-Chardonne - Jardin Renaissance de Sainte-Honorine-la-Chardonne

== Gardens of Upper Normandy ==
=== Eure ===
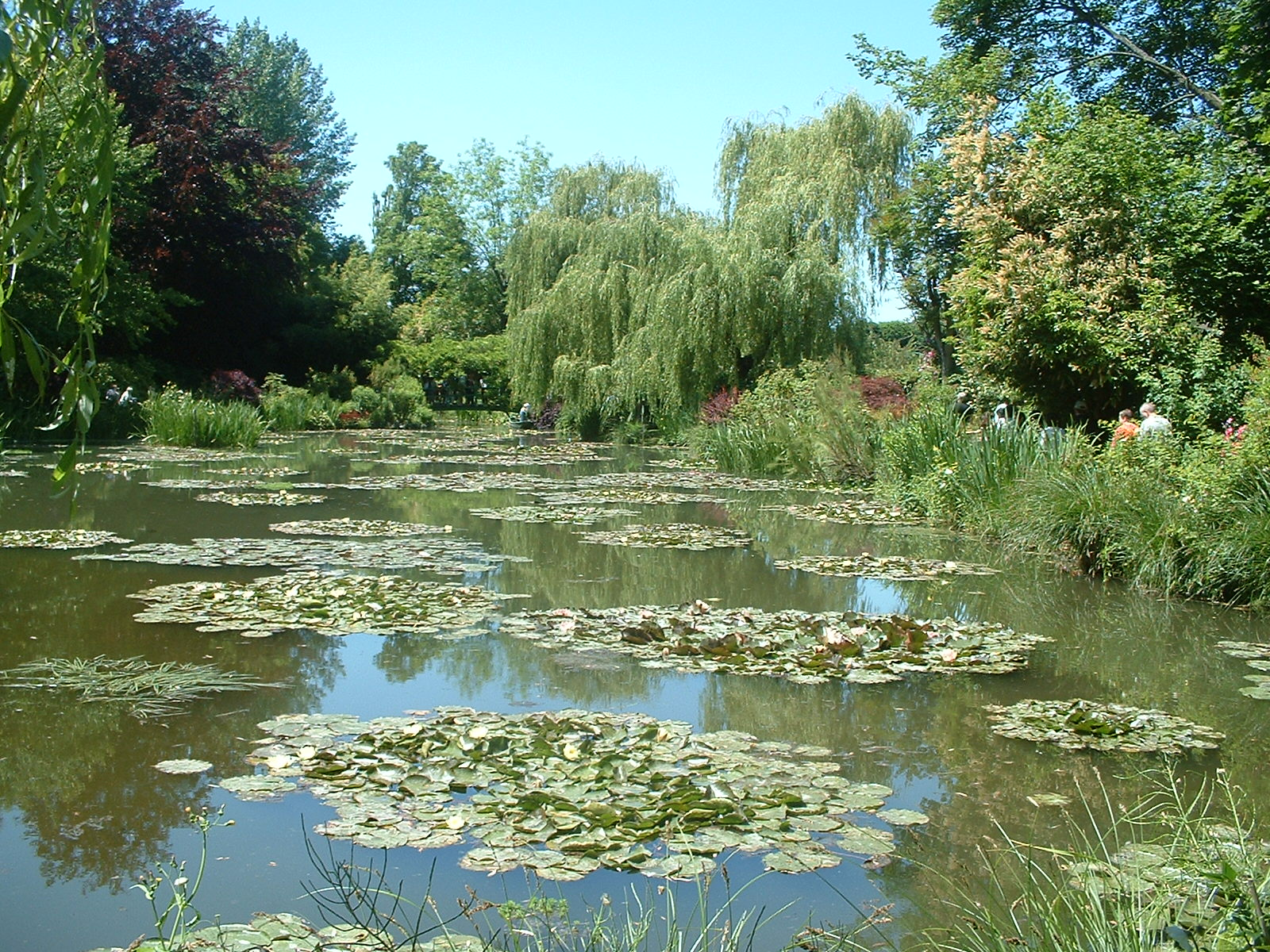
Garden of Claude Monet at Giverny

- The Gardens of Claude Monet at Giverny
- Arboretum d'Harcourt at Harcourt
- Château du Champ-de-Bataille at Le Neubourg
- Château de Miserey at Miserey
- Château de Saint-Just at Saint-Just, a 17th-century Renaissance manor and water garden near the Seine.
- Château de Vandrimare at Vandrimare

=== Seine-Maritime ===
- Jardin potager arc-en-ciel in Auffay
- Parc de Galleville in Doudeville
- Jardin d'art et d'essai in Normanville
- Miromesnil in Tourville-sur-Arques
- Abbey Saint-Georges in Saint-Martin-de-Boscherville
- Bois des Moutiers in Varengeville-sur-Mer
- Clos du Coudray in Étaimpuis
- Manoir de Villers in Saint Pierre de Manneville

== Gardens of the Pays de la Loire ==
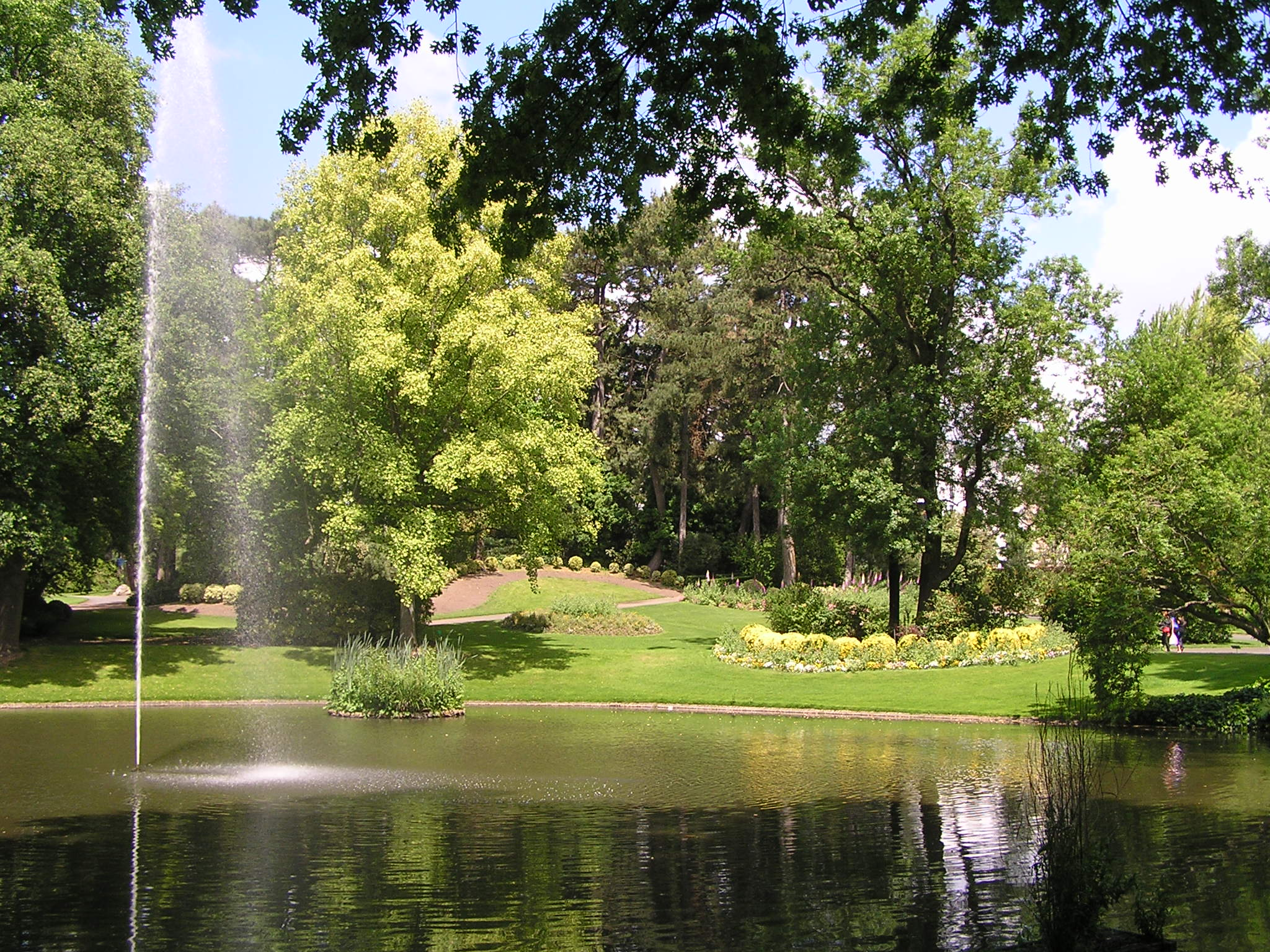
Jardin des plantes de Nantes

=== Loire-Atlantique ===
- Jardin des plantes de Nantes in Nantes

=== Maine-et-Loire ===
- Parc Oriental de Maulévrier in Maulévrier –
- Parc de Lathan in Breil
- Château du Pin in Champtocé-sur-Loire

=== Mayenne ===
- Château de Craon in Craon
- Jardin de la Pellerine in La Pellerine :
- Château de Clivoy in Mailland

=== Sarthe ===
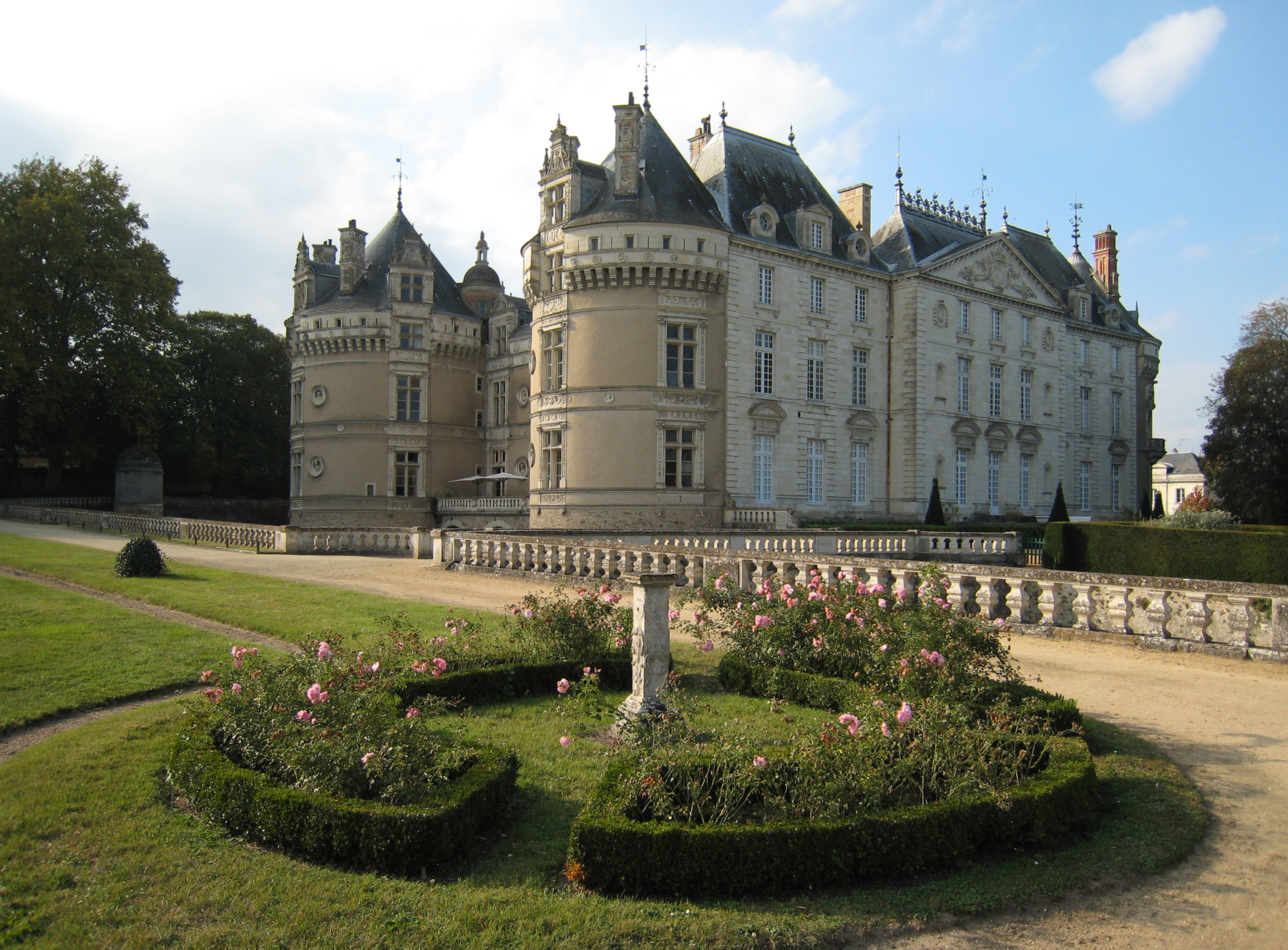
Château du Lude and gardens

- Crannes-en-Champagne – Gardens of Mirail
- Poncé-sur-le-Loir – Gardens of the Château de Poncé
- Le Lude – Park and gardens of the Château du Lude
- Louplande – Garden of the Château de Vilaines
- Saint-Christophe-en-Champagne – Gardens of la Massonnière

=== Vendée ===
- Thiré – Gardens of Bâtiment

== Gardens of Picardy ==
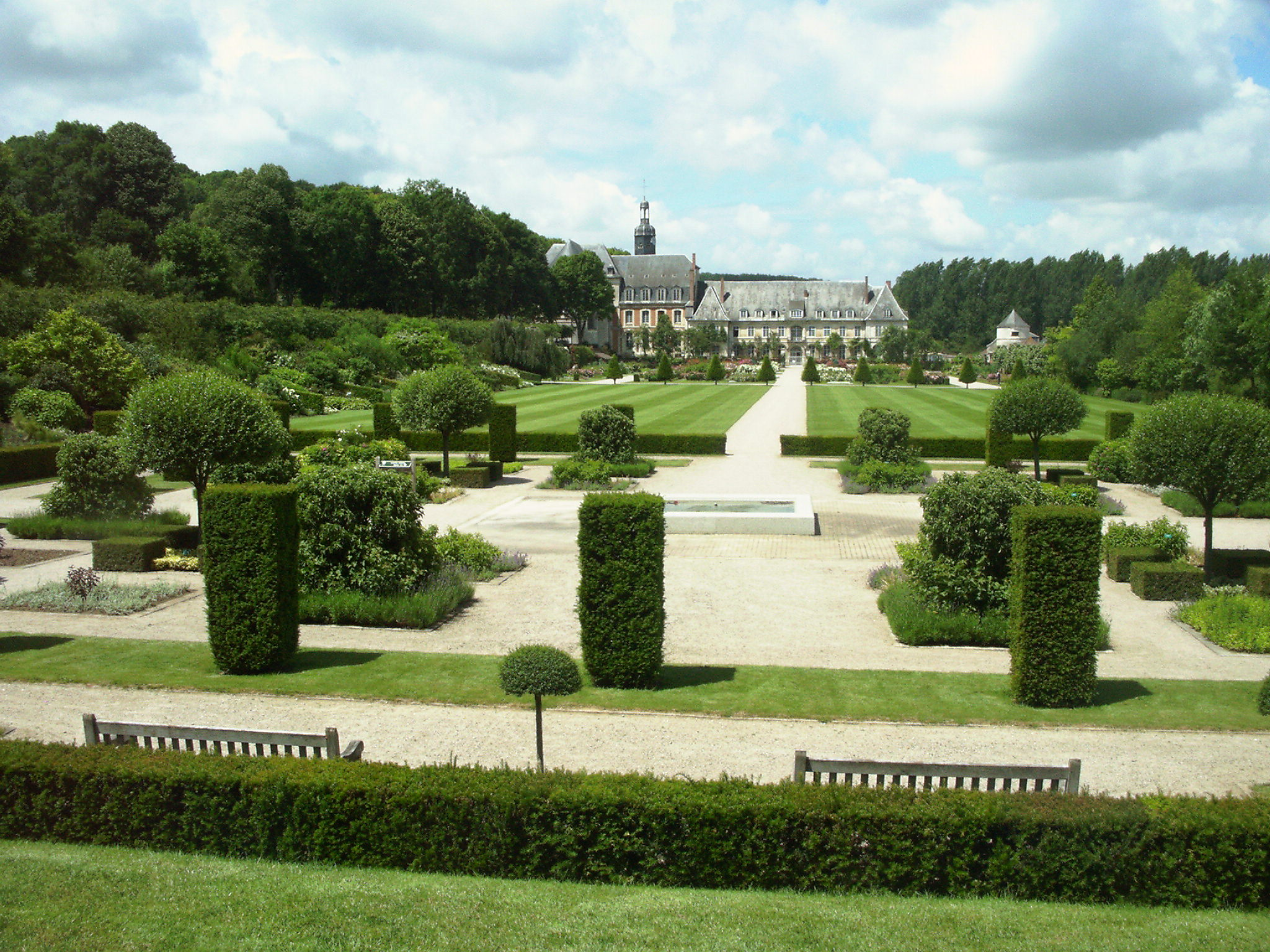
Gardens of Valloires (Somme)

=== Aisne ===
- Bosmont-sur-Serre – Garden of Bosmont-sur-Serre.
- Largny-sur-Automne – Garden of the château de la Muette.
- Orgeval – Le Vendangeoir.
- Puisieux-et-Clanlieu – gardens of the château.
- Viels-Maisons – Gardens of Viels-Maisons.

=== Oise ===
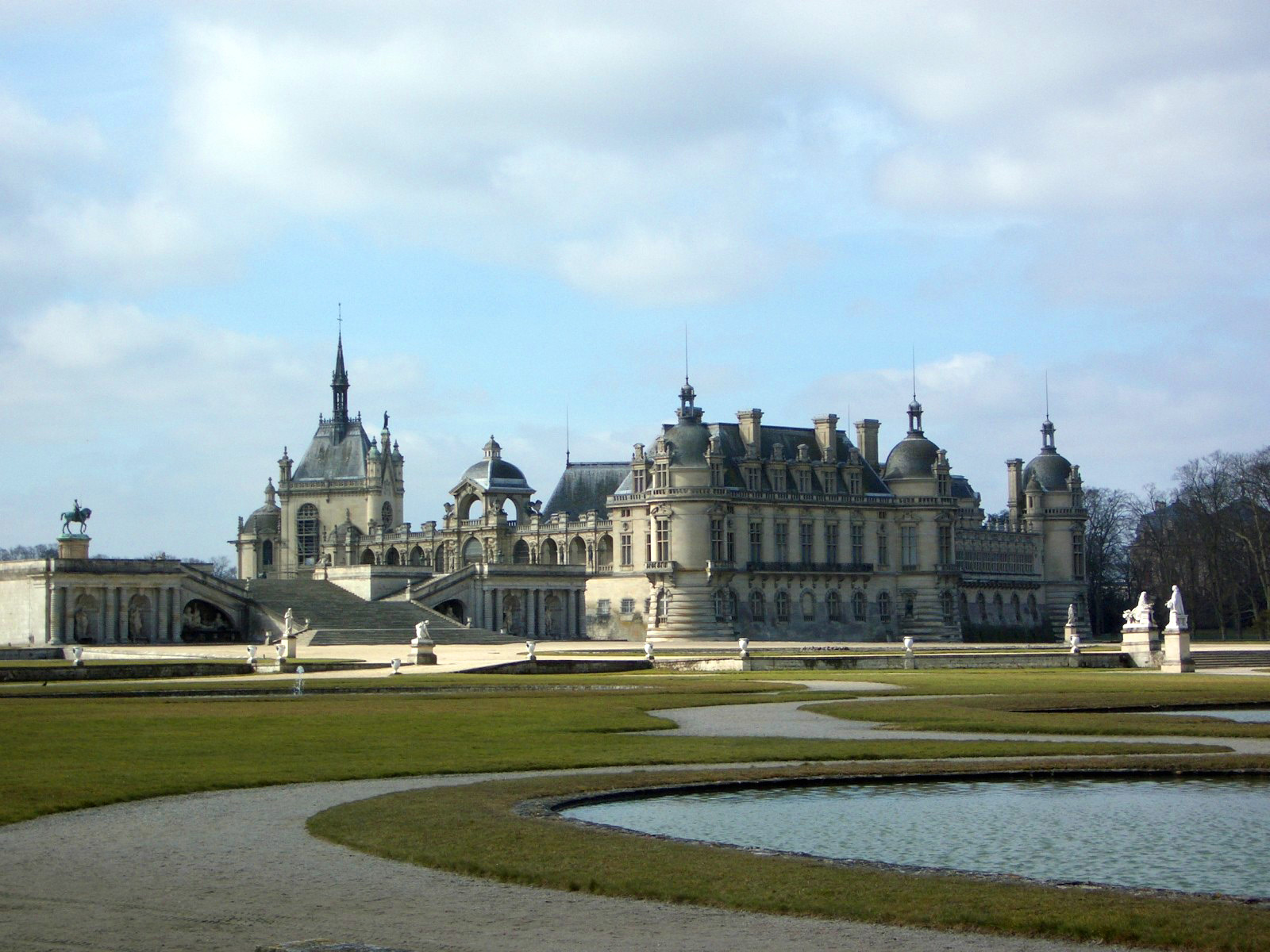
Gardens of the Château de Chantilly.

- Gardens of the Château de Chantilly at Chantilly –
- Potager des Princes at Chantilly –
- Château de Compiègne at Compiègne –
- Rose garden of the Abbey of Chaalis at Fontaine-Chaalis
- Park of the château de Valgenceuse at Senlis –
- Garden of the castle-keep of Vez at Vez –

=== Somme ===
- Abbeville – Gardens of the Château de Bagatelle
- Argoules Gardens of Valloires
- Maizicourt – Garden of the château de Maizicourt
- Morvillers-Saint-Saturnin – Park of the Château de Digeon
- Rambures – Parc et Roseraie du Château de Rambures
- Saint-Valery-sur-Somme – Herbarium of the ramparts

== Gardens of Poitou-Charentes ==
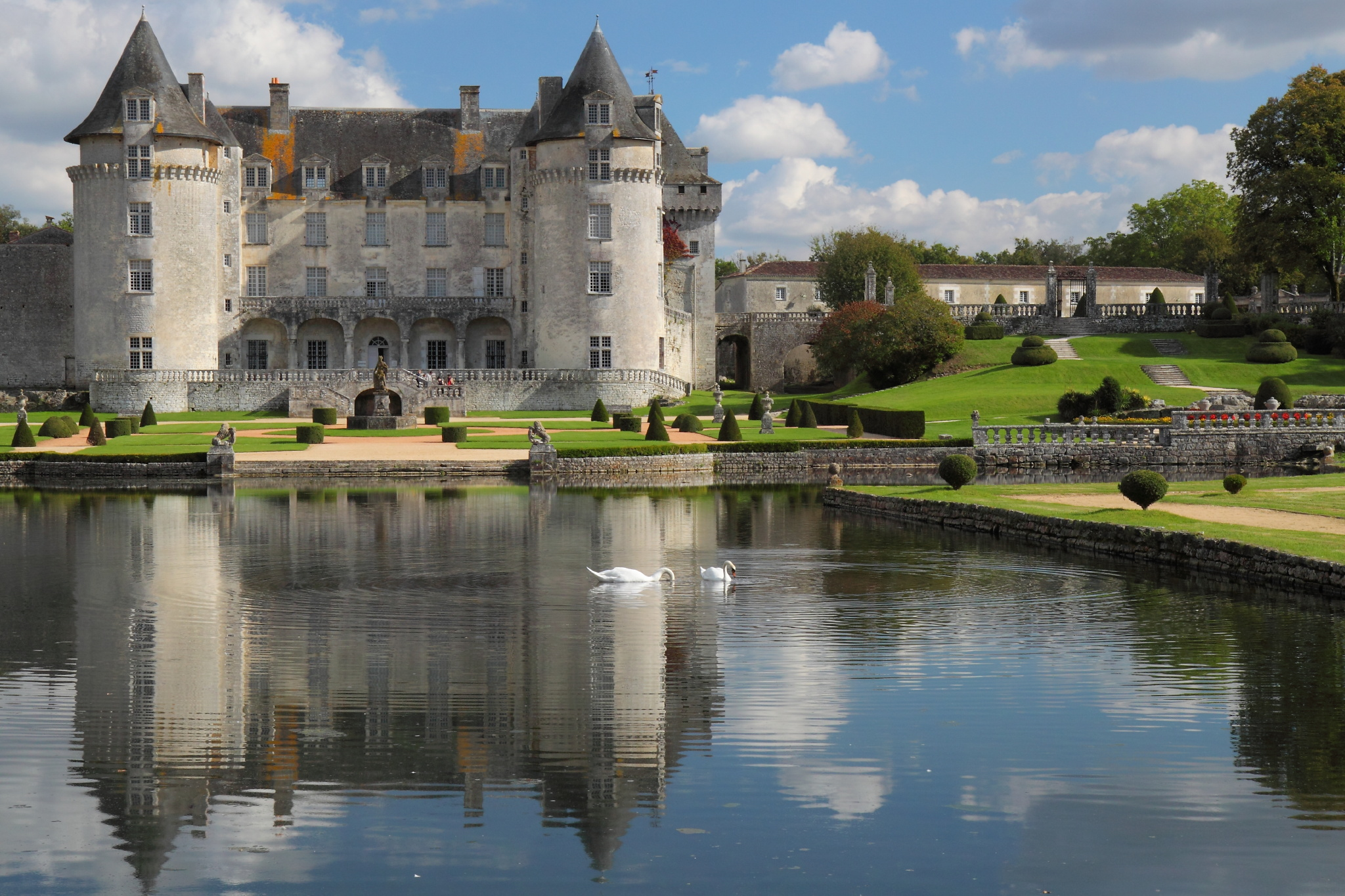
Château de La Roche-Courbon

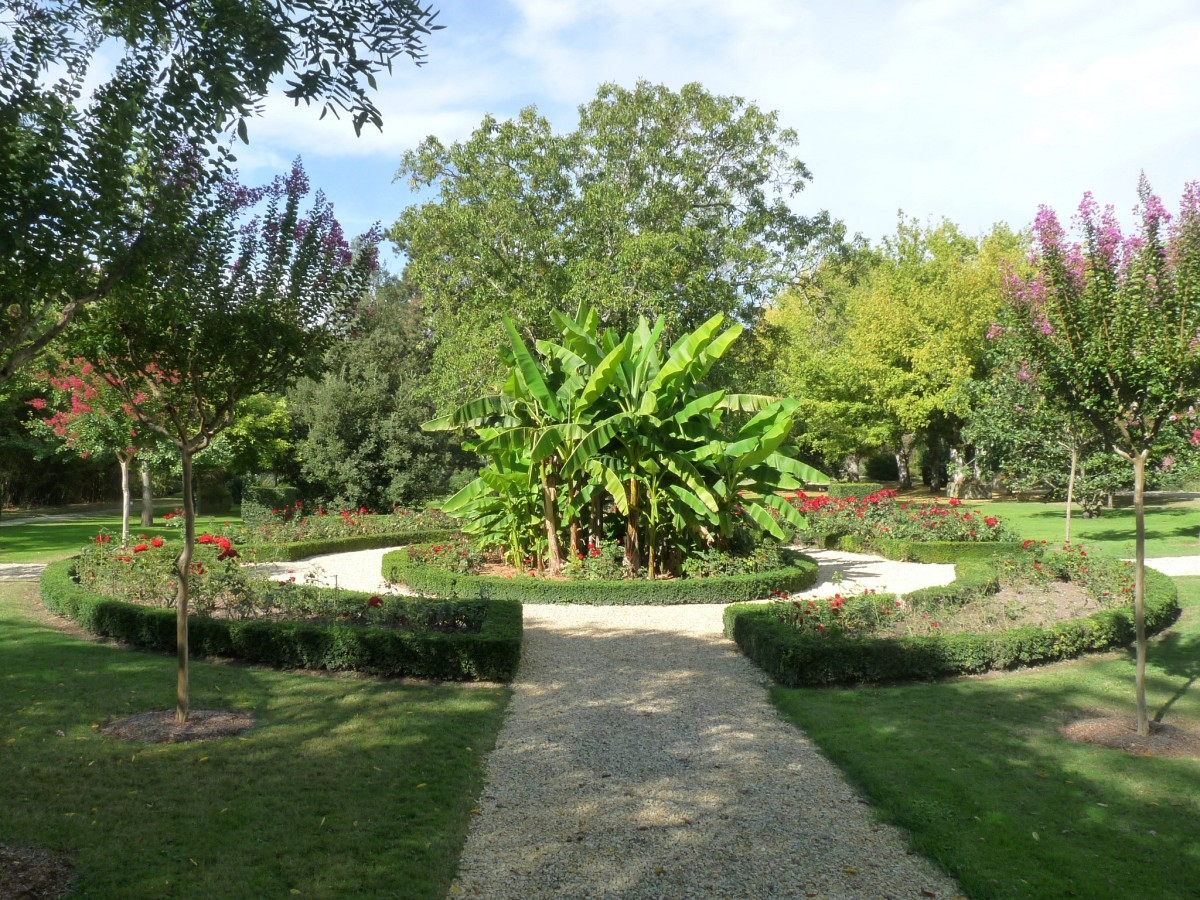
Château de Beaulon garden

=== Charente ===
- Jardins du Chaigne in Touzac
- Jardins du Logis de Forge in Mouthiers-sur-Boëme
- Jardin Monastique Medieval in Tusson
- L'Abregement in Bioussac

=== Charente-Maritime ===
- Château de La Roche-Courbon in Saint-Porchaire :
- Château de Beaulon in Saint-Dizant-du-Gua
- Gardens of la Boirie in Saint-Pierre-d'Oléron

=== Deux-Sèvres ===
- Beaulieu-sous-Parthenay : La Guyonnière (recreation of a medieval garden)

=== Vienne ===
- Aslonnes : Laverré
- Château de Touffou in Bonnes.

== Gardens of Provence-Alpes-Côte d'Azur ==
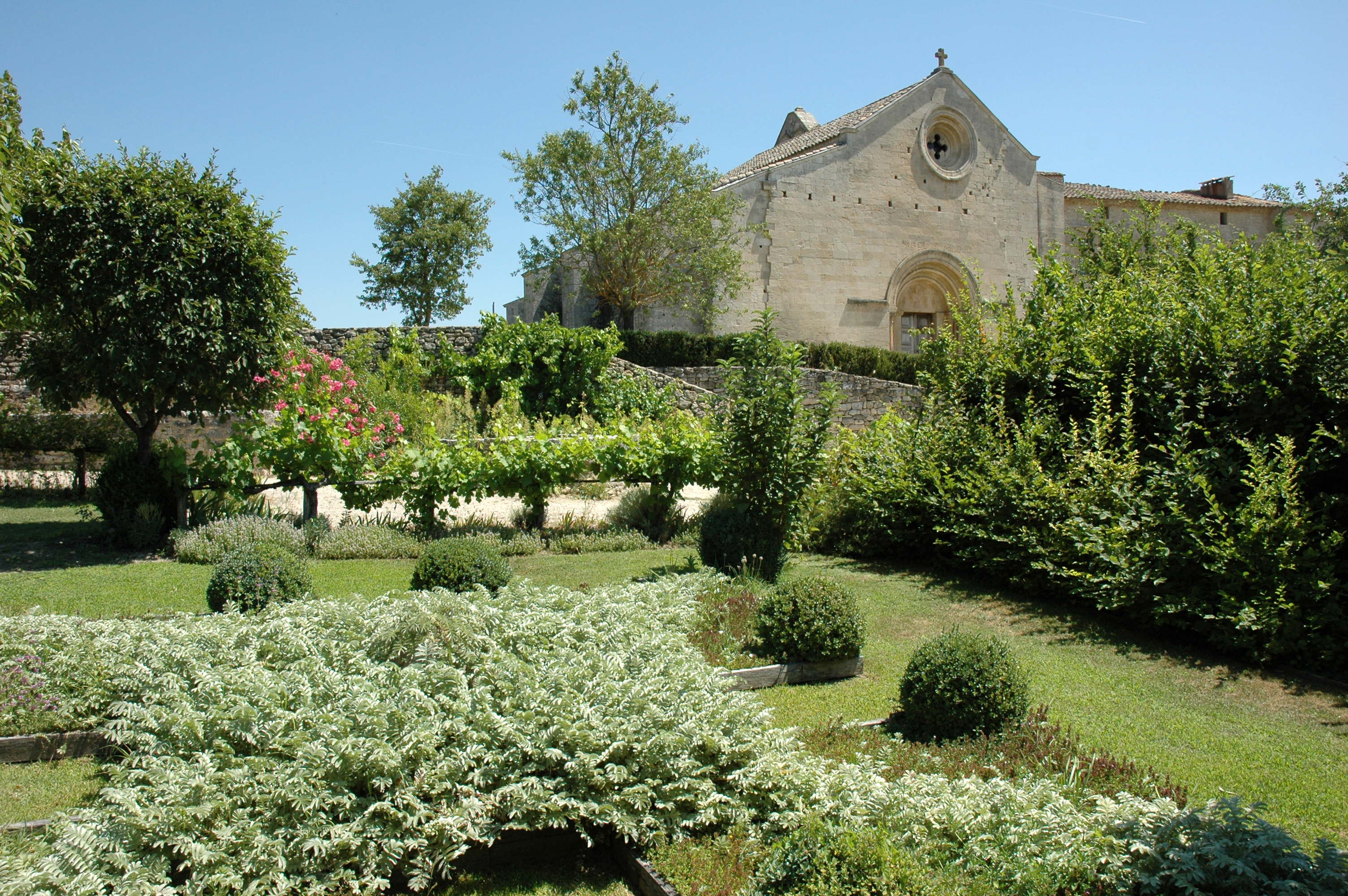
Jardins de Salagon

=== Alpes-de-Haute-Provence ===
- Jardins de Salagon in Mane. Five modern gardens, including a garden of perfumes, surrounding a 12th-century priory.
- Château de Sauvan in Mane. Eighteenth-century château with a Garden à la française.
- Clos de Villeneuve in Valensole.

=== Hautes-Alpes ===
- Conservatoire botanique national alpin de Gap-Charance in Gap. A botanical conservatory devoted to alpine plants.
- Jardin botanique alpin du Lautaret in Villar-d'Arêne. A botanical garden specializing in the flowers and plants of the high Alps.

=== Alpes-Maritimes ===
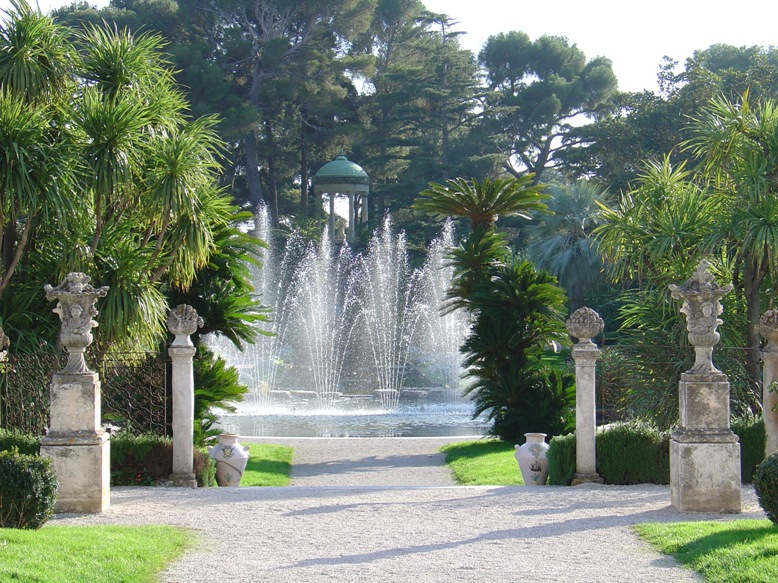
The Villa Ephrussi de Rothschild

- Château de la Napoule in Mandelieu-la-Napoule.
- Jardin d'agrumes du Palais Carnolès in Menton.
- Serre de la Madone in Menton.
- Villa Ephrussi in Saint-Jean-Cap-Ferrat.

=== Bouches-du-Rhône ===
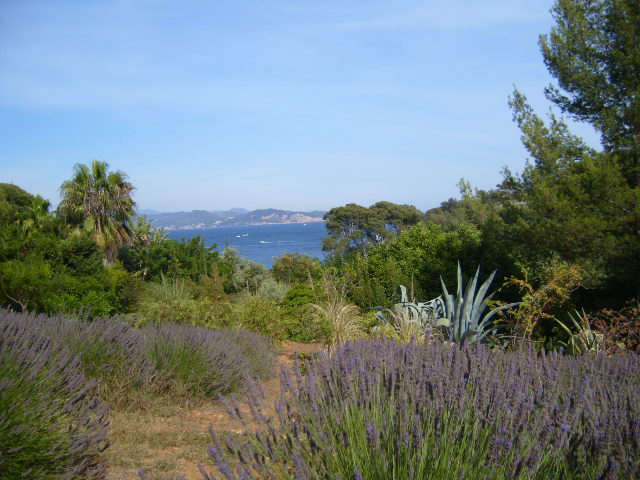
Parc du Mugel, La Ciotat

- Parc du Mugel in La Ciotat. A municipal garden, exotic garden, and nature preserve of the native plants of Provence, located next to a calanque, or rocky inlet of the Mediterranean.
- Jardin d'Éguilles in Éguilles
- Jardin de l'alchimiste in Eygalières (closed in 2017)
- Jardins d'Albertas in Bouc-Bel-Air
- Parc Borély in Marseille.
- Parc Longchamp in Marseille
- Jardin de la Magalone in Marseille
- Parc du XXVième Centenaire in Marseille

=== Var ===
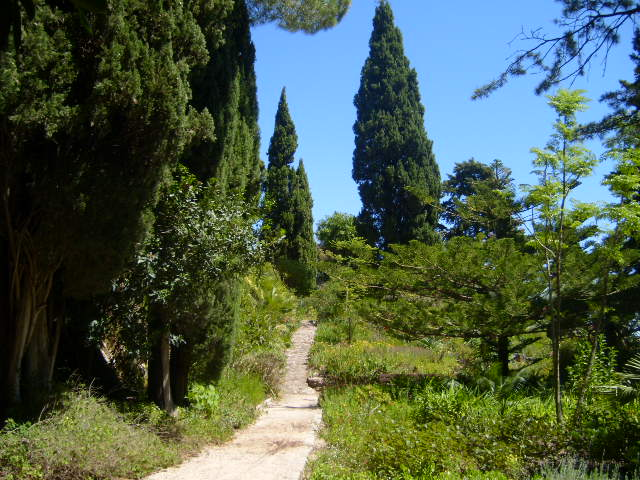
Edith Wharton's Garden, Castel Sainte-Claire, Hyères

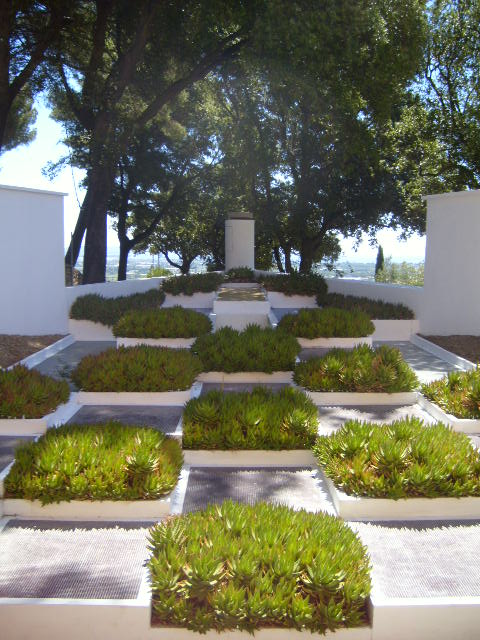
Cubist garden of the Villa Noailles, Hyères

- Domaine du Rayol in Le Rayol-Canadel-sur-Mer
- Jardin d'Oiseaux Tropicaux in La Londe-les-Maures
- Parc du Moulin Blanc in Saint-Zacharie
- Jardin L'Hardy-Denonain in Gassin
- Le Plantier de Costebelle
- Domaine d'Orvès in La Valette-du-Var
- Domaine de Baudouvin in La Valette-du-Var. Formerly owned by Henri de Rothschild, then the residence of the Prefet Maritime, the domaine, recreated in 2008, is now a public park and a contemporary Provençal garden, featuring Provençal, tropical and Mediterranean trees and flowers, orchards, vineyards and kitchen gardens, a grand alley of plane trees. fountains and pools fed by a spring, a solar-powered "orchard" cooled by mist, and views of the mountains of the Var.
- Castel Sainte-Claire in Hyères. The house, on the site of the 17th-century Convent of Sainte-Claire, was built by Olivier Voutier, a French naval officer who discovered the statue of the Venus de Milo in Greece, and later was the home of writer Edith Wharton, who planted much of the garden.
- Parc Saint-Bernard of the Villa Noailles in Hyères : 'The Parc Saint-Bernard was created by the vicomte de Noailles, a 20th-century art patron, next to his summer house, the Villa Noailles, (1923–1926), which was one of the first modernist houses in France. The villa features a small triangular modern garden by Guevrekian. The main garden, now a public park, is a series of tree-shaded terraces and paths overlooking the Mediterranean, devoted to the native plants of the Mediterranean, both common and rare, including a garden of rosemary and other aromatic plants.
- Parc Olbius Riquier in Hyères. A municipal park with a botanical garden, featuring bamboo, palms and a greenhouse with tropical birds and plants.

=== Vaucluse ===
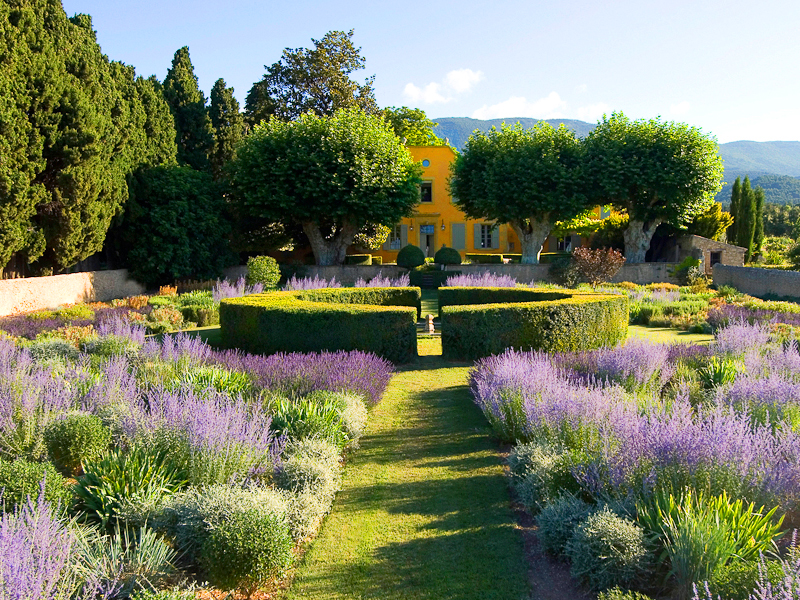
A contemporary garden à la française in Provence: the Pavillon de Galon in Cucuron

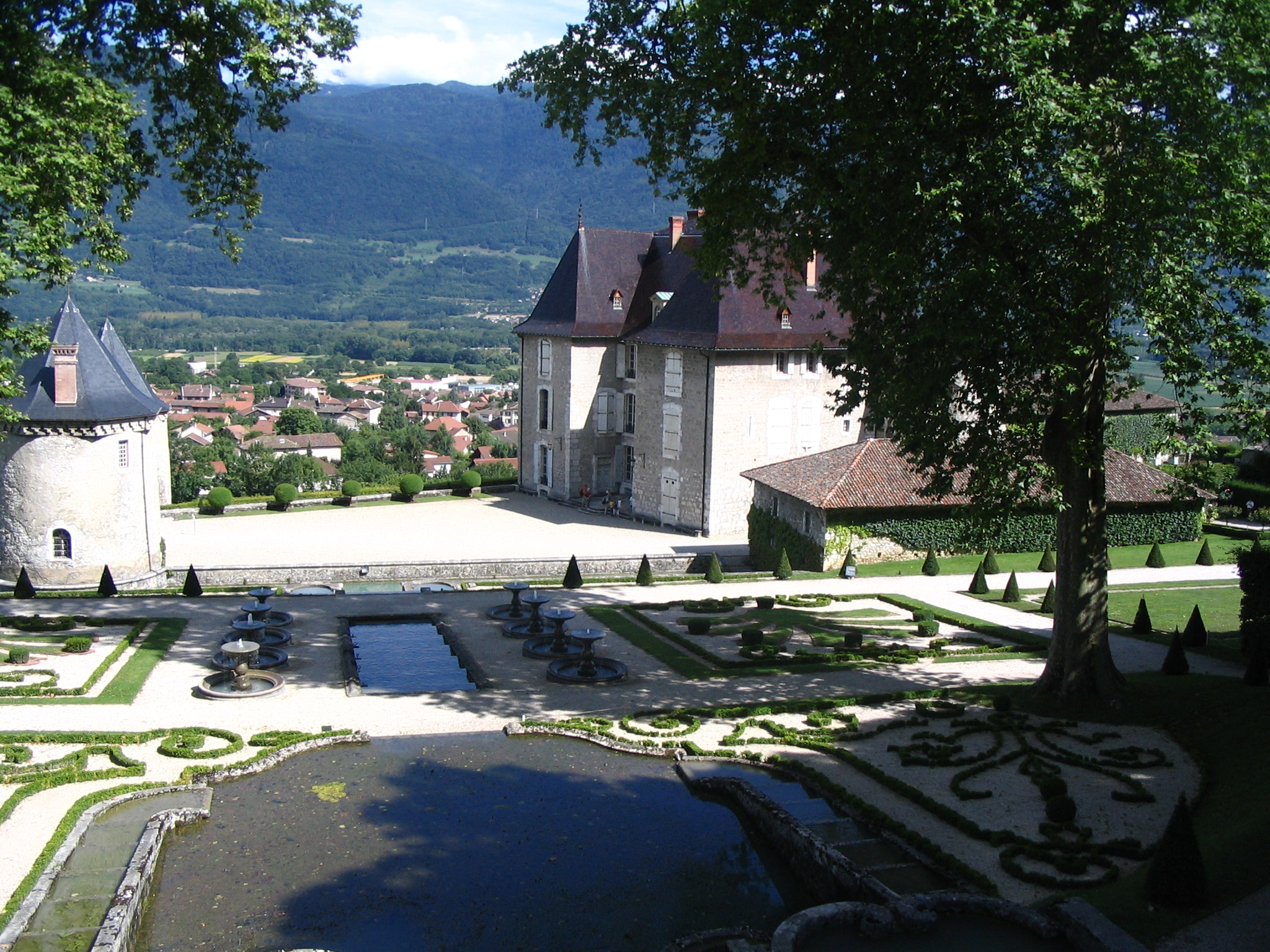
Château du Touvet at Le Touvet

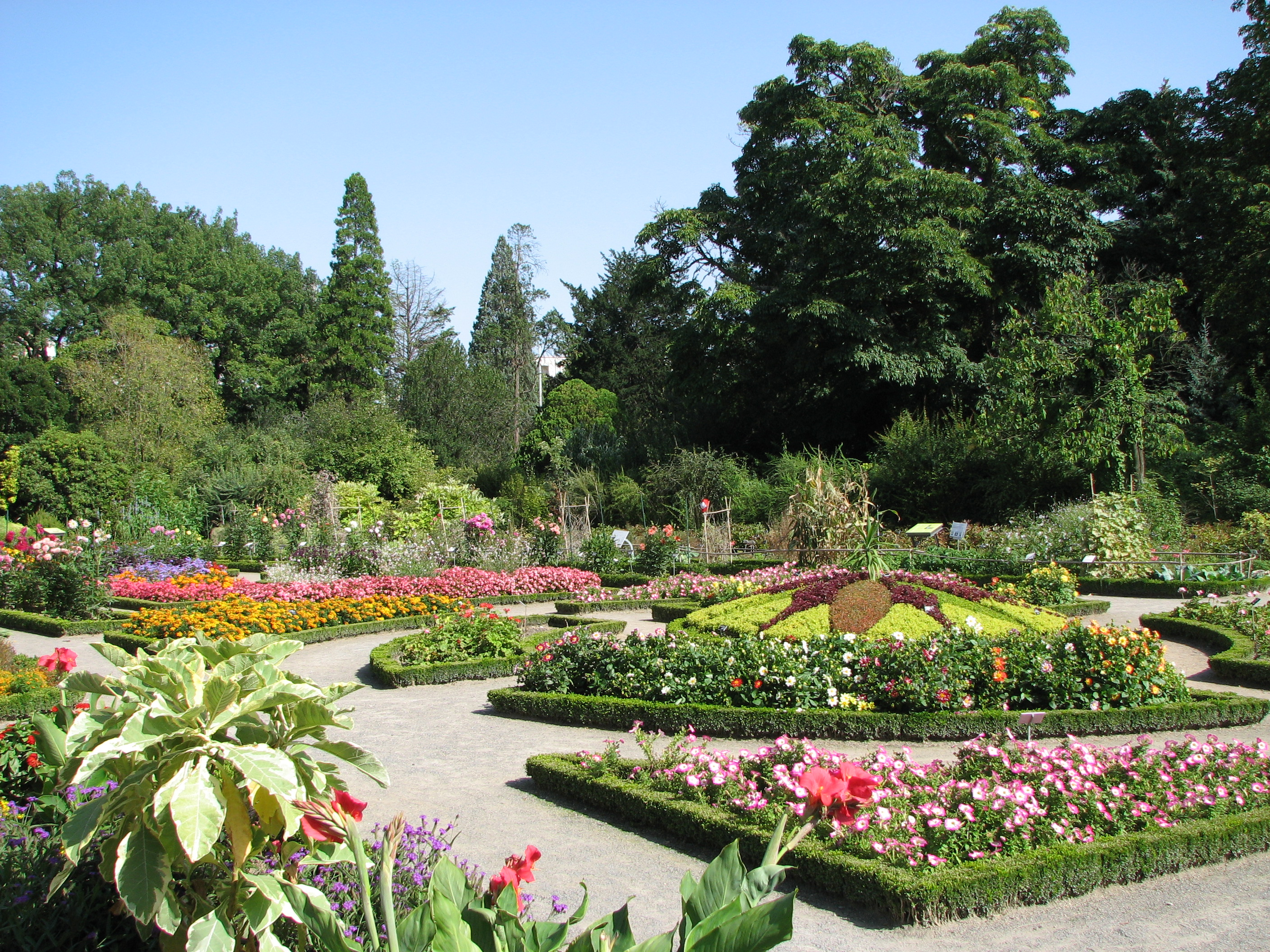
Parc de la Tête d'Or in Lyon

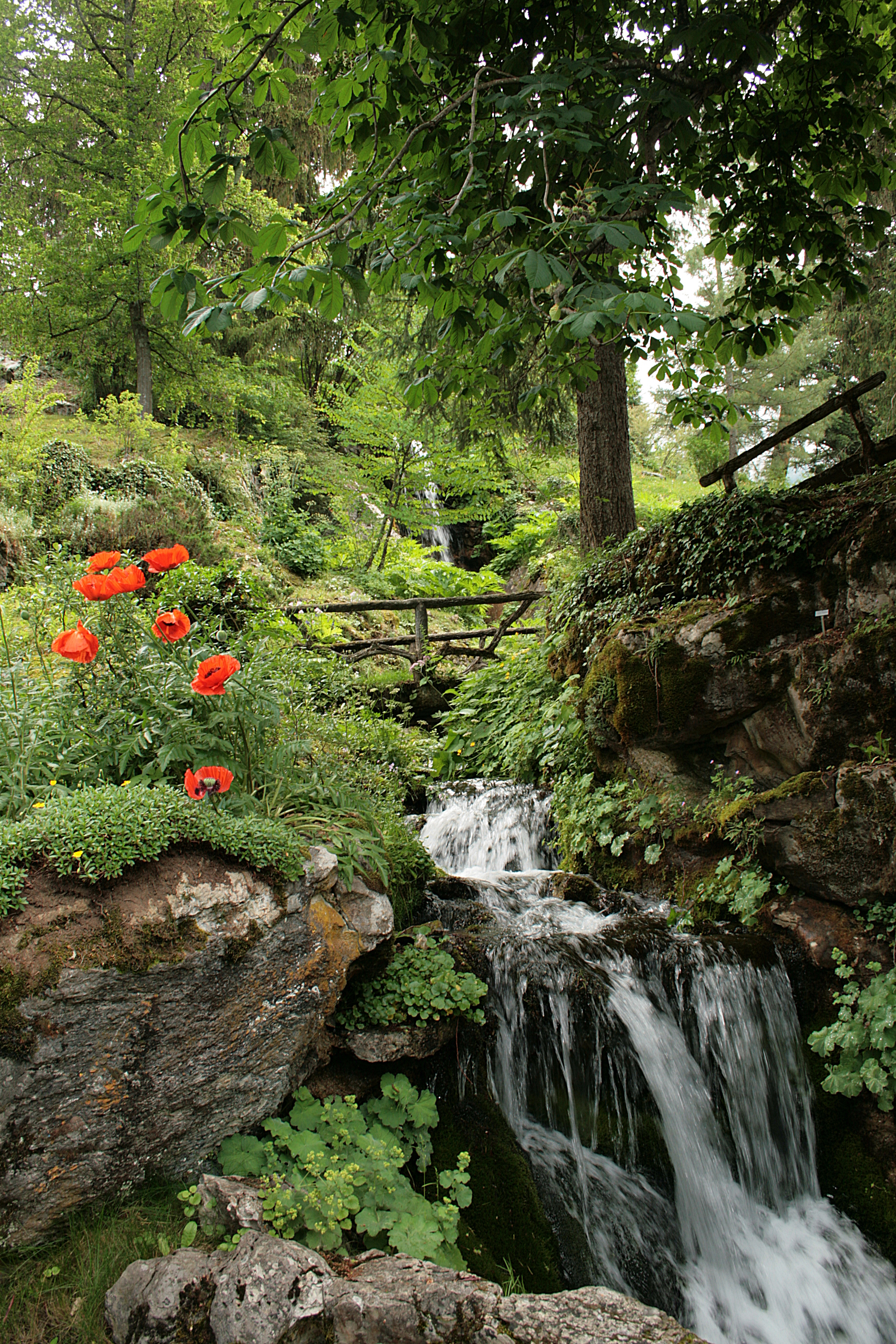
The botanical garden of Jaÿsinia in Samoëns

- Le Pavillon de Galon. A French contemporary garden "à la française" inspired by the Provençal landscape, fronting an 18th-century hunting pavilion.
- Jardins du Château Val Joanis in Pertuis. A modern reconstruction of a Garden à la française and kitchen garden of the 18th century.
- Garden of the Château de Brantes in Sorgues. A contemporary garden inspired by the gardens of Tuscany, created in 1956.
- La Louve in Bonnieux. A contemporary garden created in the 1980s by Nicole de Vésian, textile designer for the Paris fashion house of Hermès.
- Jarditrain in Saint-Didier

== Gardens of the Rhône-Alpes ==
=== Drôme ===
- Jardin zen d'Erik Borja at Beaumont-Monteux
- Jardin des herbes at La Garde-Adhémar
- Parc Jouvet in Valence

=== Isère ===
- Château du Touvet at Le Touvet. a garden à la française and water garden, featuring a stairway of water constructed between 1758 and 1765.
- Parc du Musée Hébert in La Tronche
- Château de Vizille at Vizille

=== Loire ===
- Ecomusée des Monts du Forez in Usson-en-Forez

=== Rhône ===
- Château de Laye in Saint-Georges-de-Reneins
- Parc de la Tête d'Or in Lyon
- Parc de Gerland in Lyon

=== Savoie ===
- Jardin du Prieuré in Le Bourget-du-Lac

=== Haute-Savoie ===
- Les Jardins de l'eau du Pré Curieux in Évian
- Alpine botanical garden of Jaÿsinia in Samoëns
- Le Labyrinthe - Jardin des Cinq Sens in Yvoire

== Gardens of DOM-TOM ==
=== Guadeloupe ===
- Sainte-Rose – Le Jardin Créole.
- Petit-Canal – The Landscape Park.
- Petit-Bourg – The Domaine of Vallombreuse.
- Deshaies – Jardin botanique de Deshaies.

=== Martinique ===
- Le François – fr:Garden of the Habitation Acajou
- Gros-Morne – Garden of the Habitation Saint-Étienne
- Le Morne-Rouge – The Domaine of Émeraude
- Le Prêcheur – Garden of the Habitation Céron

== See also ==
- Tourism in France
- List of botanical gardens in France
- Gardens of the French Renaissance
- Garden à la française
- French landscape garden
