= Gardens of Provence-Alpes-Côte d'Azur =

The Gardens of Provence-Alpes-Côte d'Azur (Occitan: Jardins de Provença-Alps-Còsta d'Azur) is a list and description of the parks and gardens in the region, which are classified by the Committee of Parks and Gardens of the French Ministry of Culture as among the Notable Gardens of France.

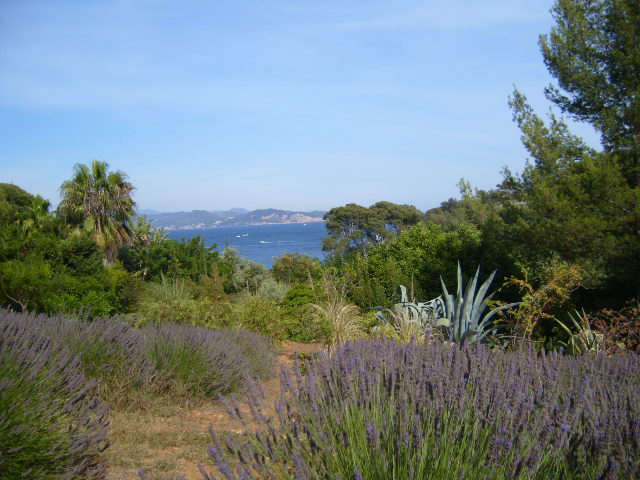
Parc du Mugel in La Ciotat

== Alpes-de-Haute-Provence ==
- Jardins de Salagon in Mane. Five modern gardens, including a garden of perfumes, surrounding a 12th-century priory.
- Château de Sauvan in Mane. 18th-century château with a jardin à la française.
- Clos de Villeneuve in Valensole. 18th-century Provençal bastide with a garden à la française.

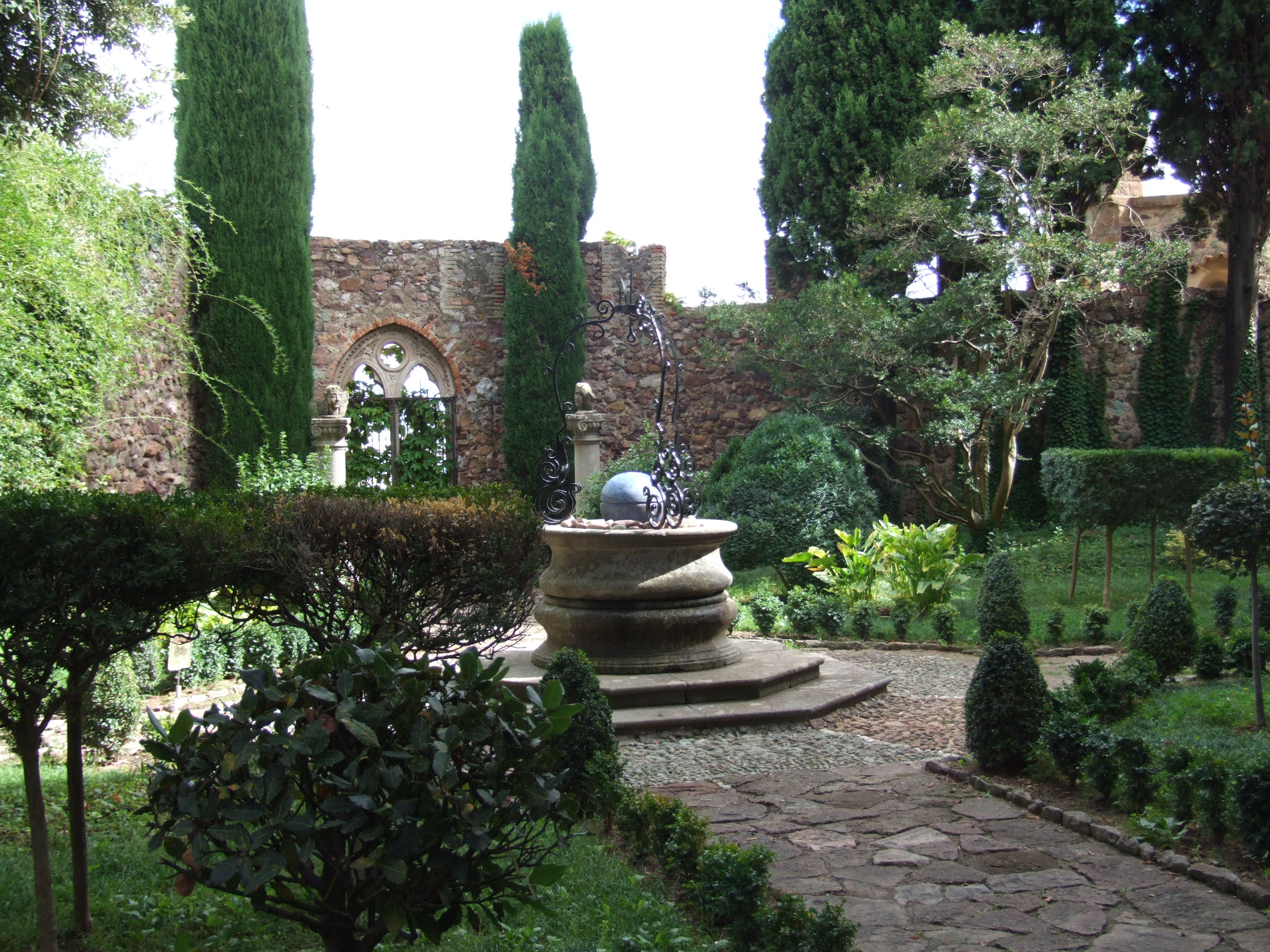
Château de la Napoule in Mandelieu-la-Napoule

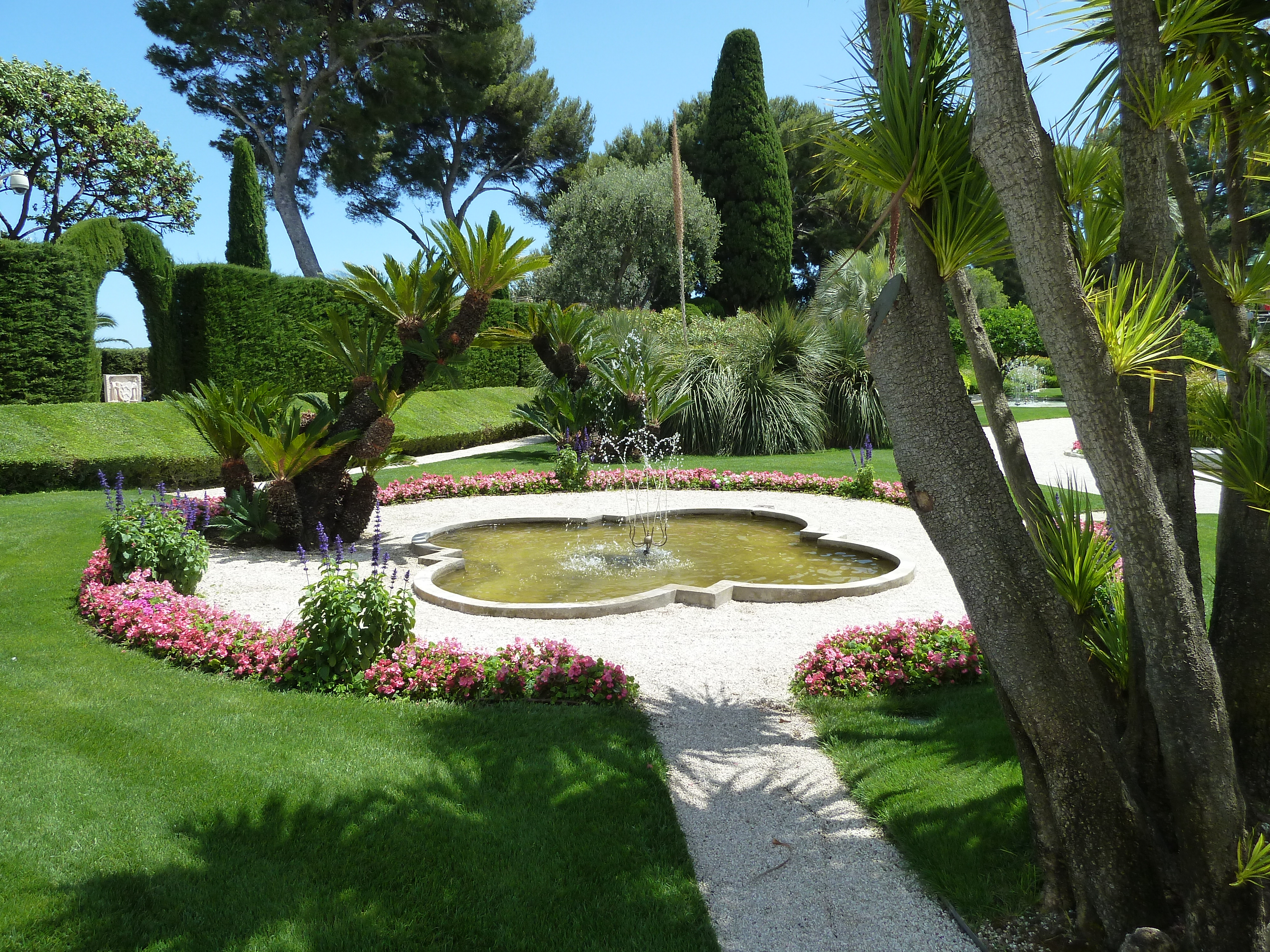
The Villa Ephrussi de Rothschild gardens in Saint-Jean-Cap-Ferrat

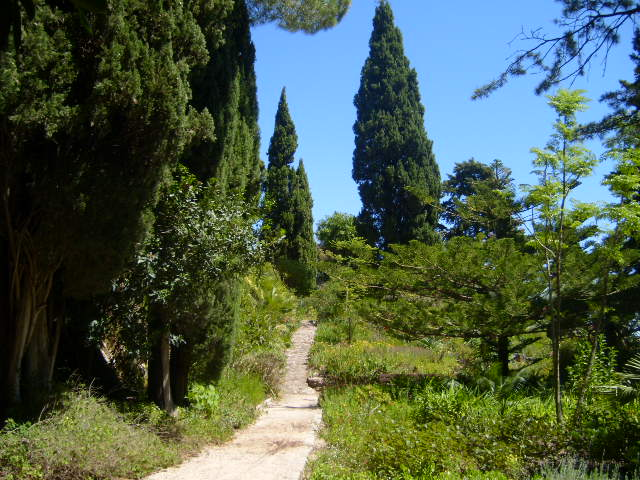
Edith Wharton's Garden, Castel Sainte-Claire, Hyères

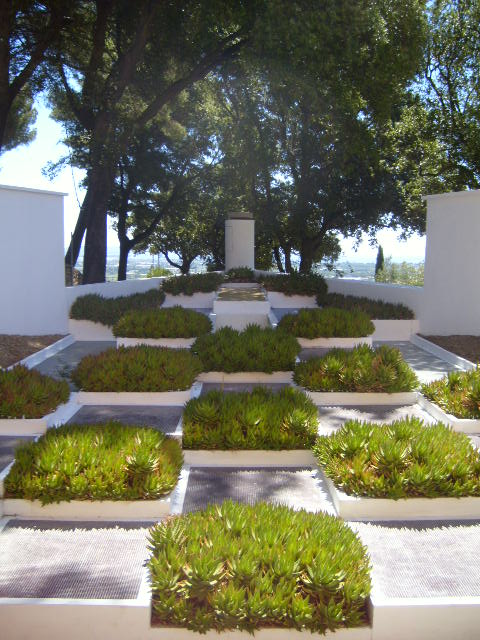
Cubist garden of the Villa Noailles, Hyères

== Hautes-Alpes ==
- Conservatoire botanique national alpin de Gap-Charance in Gap. A botanical conservatory devoted to Alpine plants.
- Jardin botanique alpin du Lautaret in Villar-d'Arêne. A botanical garden specializing in the flowers and plants of the high Alps.

== Alpes-Maritimes ==
- Château de la Napoule in Mandelieu-la-Napoule. A restored 14th-century castle by the sea with a jardin à la française and a landscape garden.
- Jardin d'agrumes du Palais Carnolès in Menton. A garden of citrus trees created in 1725 by the Prince of Monaco for his summer residence.
- Serre de la Madone in Menton. An Arts and Crafts style garden created in the 1920s.
- Villa Champfleuri in Cannes. A garden listed as a monument historique since 1990.
- Villa Cypris in Roquebrune-Cap-Martin. The villa, together with its gardens, was registered as an official historical monument in 1990.
- Villa Ephrussi in Saint-Jean-Cap-Ferrat. A seaside palazzo with nine themed gardens, built by Béatrice Ephrussi de Rothschild between 1905 and 1912.

== Bouches-du-Rhône ==
- Parc du Mugel in La Ciotat. A municipal garden, exotic garden, and nature preserve of the native plants of Provence, located next to a calanque, or rocky inlet of the Mediterranean.
- Jardins d'Albertas in Bouc-Bel-Air. Private 18th-century château and jardin à la française. Open to public.
- Jardin de l'alchimiste in Eygalières Private contemporary garden, open to public.
- Jardin d'Éguilles in Éguilles. Private contemporary garden, open to public.
- Jardin de la Magalone in Marseille. Public municipal park with an 18th-century bastide.
- Parc Borély in Marseille. Public municipal park in the city of Marseille.
- Parc Longchamp in Marseille. Public municipal garden in Marseille surrounding the chateau d'eau, the home of the city's fine arts museum.
- Parc du 26e Centenaire in Marseille. Contemporary gardens and municipal park, created in 1998.

== Var ==
- Castel Sainte-Claire in Hyères. The house, on the site of the 17th century Convent of Sainte-Claire, was built by Olivier Voutier, a French naval officer who discovered the statue of the Venus de Milo in Greece, and later was the home of writer Edith Wharton, who planted much of the garden.
- Domaine d'Orvès in La Valette-du-Var
- Domaine du Rayol in Le Rayol-Canadel-sur-Mer
- Jardin d'Oiseaux Tropicaux in La Londe-les-Maures
- Parc du Moulin Blanc in Saint-Zacharie
- Parc Olbius Riquier in Hyères
- Parc Saint-Bernard of the Villa Noailles in Hyères. The Parc Saint-Bernard was created by the vicomte de Noailles, a 20th-century art patron, next to his summer house, the Villa Noailles, (1923–1926), which was one of the first modernist houses in France. The villa features a small triangular modern garden by Guevrekian. The main garden, now a public park, is a series of tree-shaded terraces and paths overlooking the Mediterranean, devoted to the native plants of the Mediterranean, both common and rare, including a garden of rosemary and other aromatic plants.

== Vaucluse ==
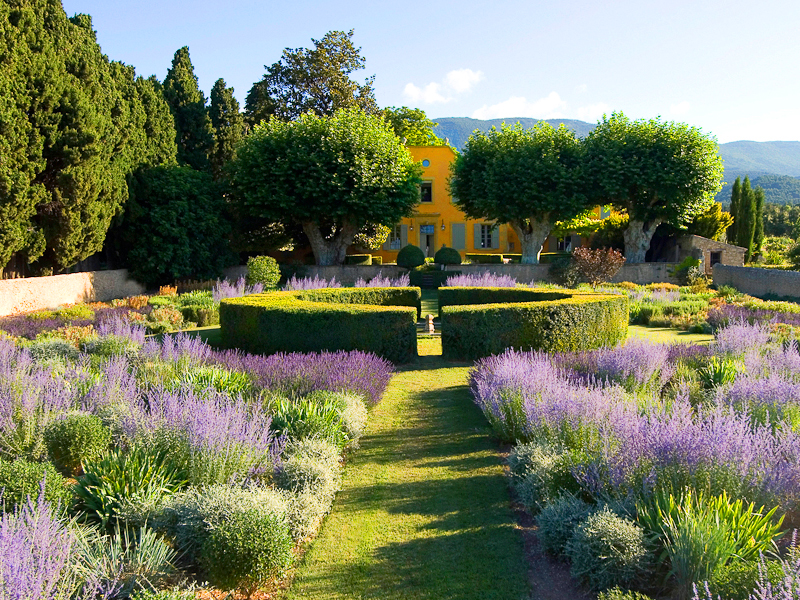
The Pavillon de Galon with a partial view of its garden

- Jardins du Château Val Joanis in Pertuis. A modern reconstruction of a garden à la française and kitchen garden of the 18th century. .
- Garden of the Château de Brantes in Sorgues. A contemporary garden inspired by the gardens of Tuscany, created in 1957.
- La Louve in Bonnieux. A contemporary garden created in the 1980s by Nicole de Véslan, textile designer for the Paris fashion house of Hermès.
- Pavillon de Galon. A 5 hectare garden, which contains a modern French formal garden created in 2004.
