= Jardins d'Albertas =

Garden in Bouc-Bel-Air, France

Coordinates: 43.4534°N 5.4059°E

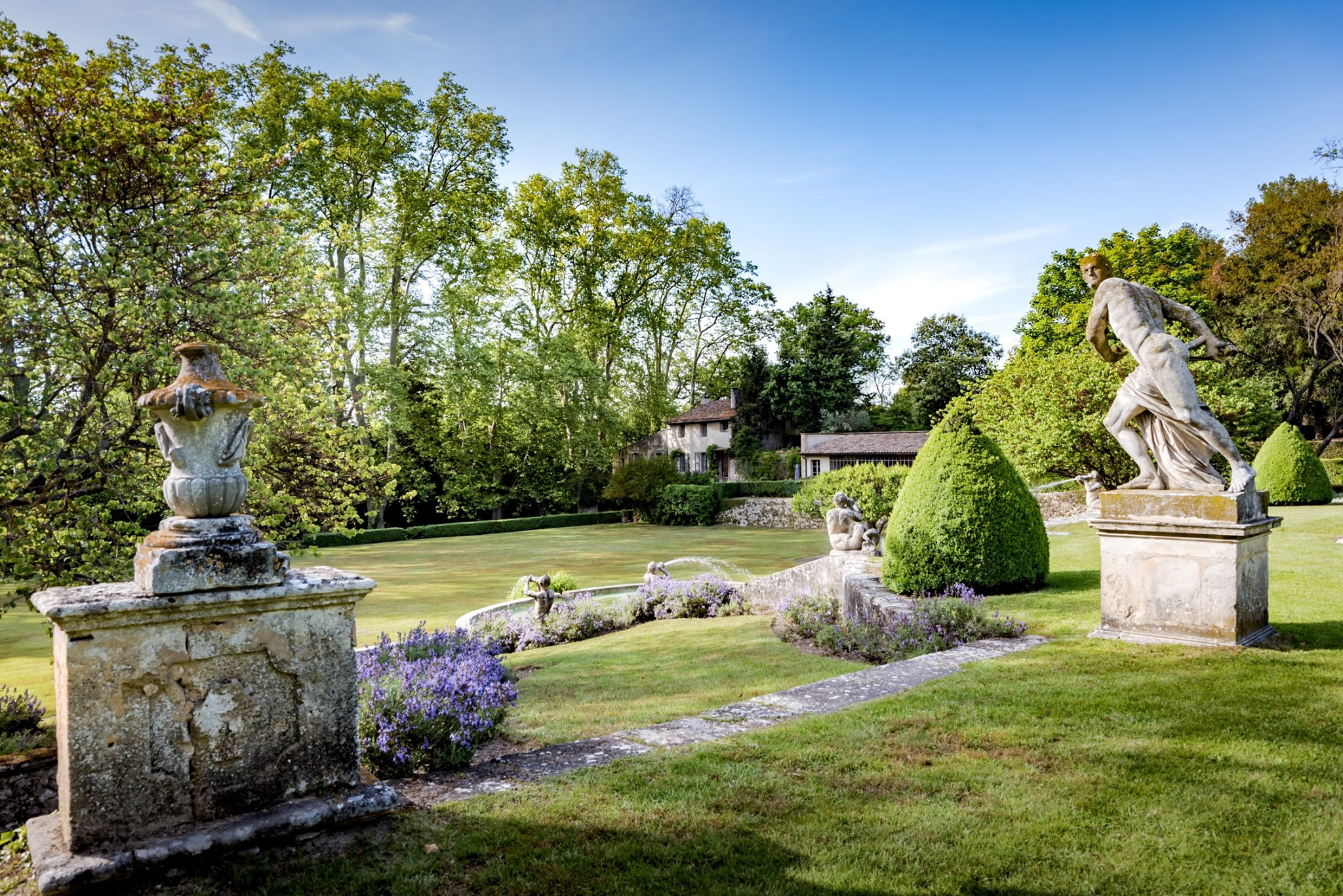

The Jardins d'Albertas are private, 18th-century gardens à la française in the town of Bouc-Bel-Air in the Bouches-du-Rhône department of France. They are classified by the French Ministry of Culture as one of the Remarkable Gardens of France.

== Description ==
The gardens combine Italian inspiration and the classic French garden style. The terrace has fountains fed by four springs; the garden is ornamented with statues of Hercules, David, two gladiators, and eight tritons, and has a grand canal, a grotto, and a mill.

== History ==
The land where the gardens are located has belonged to the Albertas family since 1673. The gardens were originally created in 1751 by Jean-Baptiste Albertas, the first president of the cour des comptes of the town of Aix-en-Provence. In 1790, on July 14, the first anniversary of the French Revolution, he was assassinated by Anicet Martel from Auriol. His son was made a Pair of France by King Louis XVIII, and became Prefet of the Bouches-du-Rhône.

The gardens fell into disrepair in the first half of the 20th century, and were restored beginning in 1949 by Jean d'Albertas.

== See also ==
- Gardens of Provence-Alpes-Côte d'Azur
