= Jardin de l'alchimiste =

Garden in Eygalières, Provence, France

Coordinates: 43.7723°N 4.9460°E

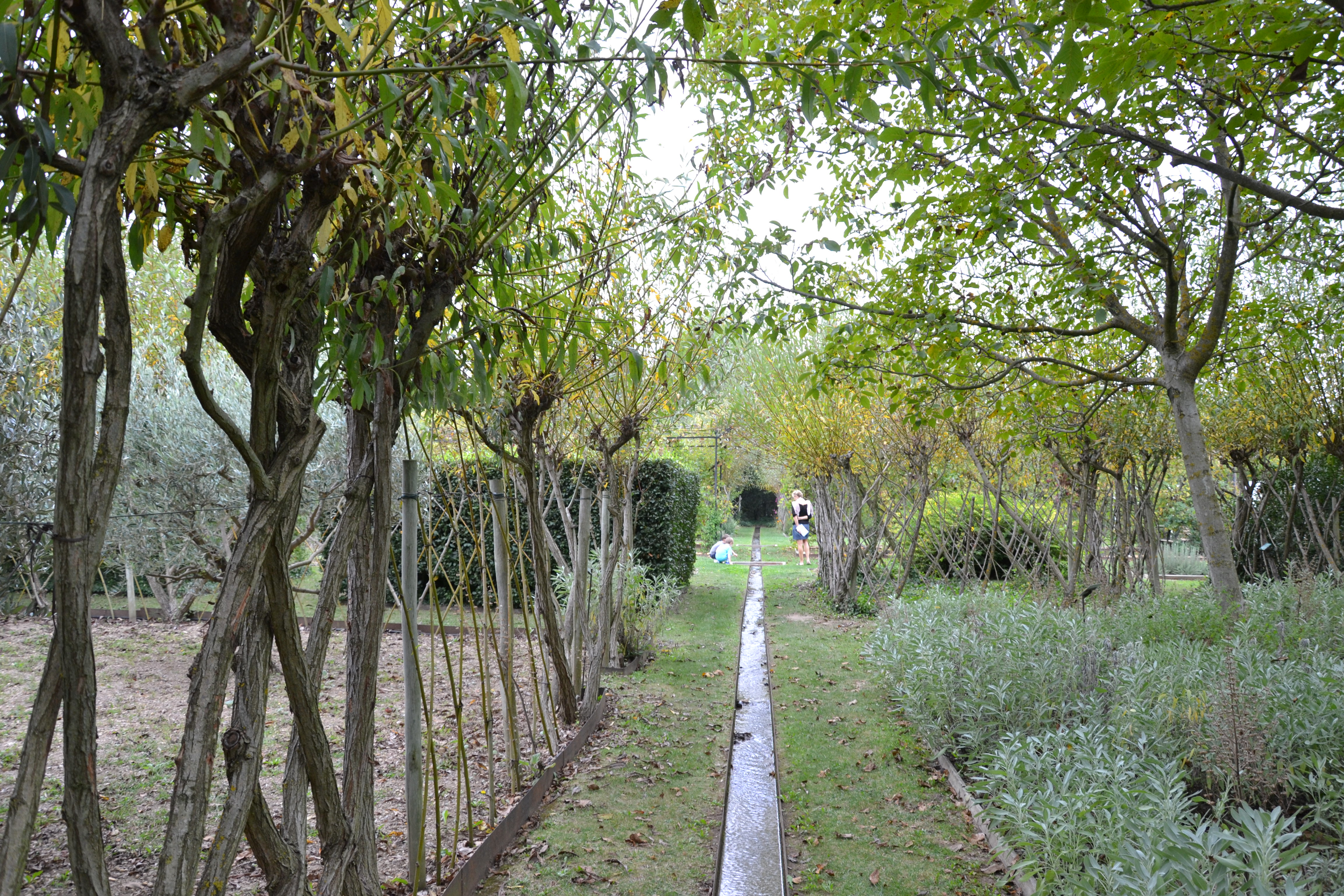
Jardin de l'alchimiste

The Jardin de l'alchimiste was a private contemporary garden in the town of Eygalières, in the Bouches-du-Rhône department of France. It was classified by the French Ministry of Culture as one of the Remarkable Gardens of France.

The garden was created in 1997 by two landscape architects, Arnaud Maurières and Eric Ossart. It begins with a labyrinth, and it is a philosophical essay in the form of a garden, representing physical and intellectual development, and the development of the senses. Part of the garden is devoted to plants popularly associated with magic and alchemy. It was owned by Alain and Marie de Larouzière.

The garden was open to the public. It closed in June 2017.

== See also ==
- Gardens of Provence-Alpes-Côte d'Azur
