= Domaine du Rayol =

Botanical garden and arboretum in Provence-Alpes-Côte d'Azur, France

Coordinates: 43.1554°N 6.4806°E

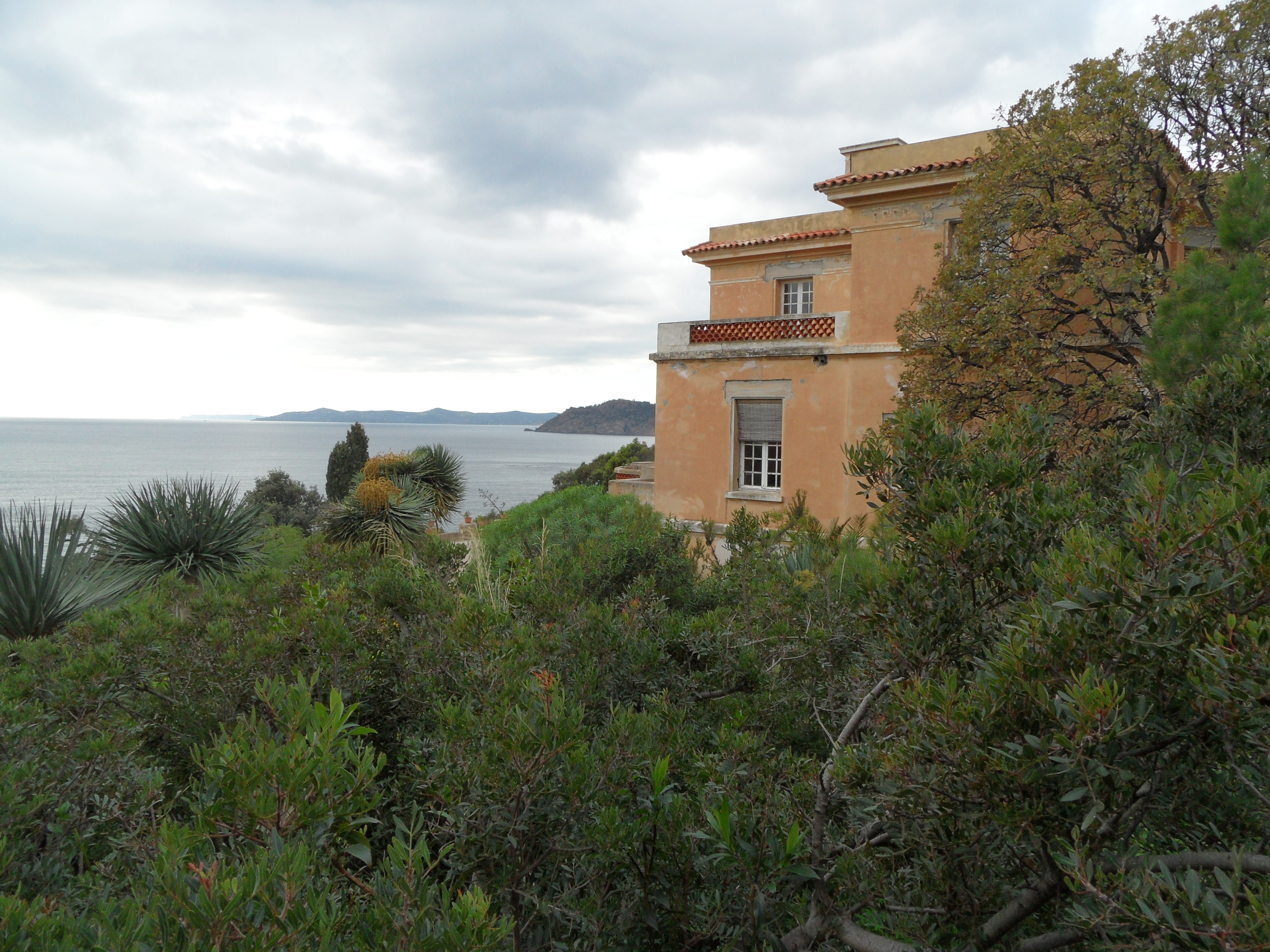
Hotel de la Mer of the Domaine du Rayol

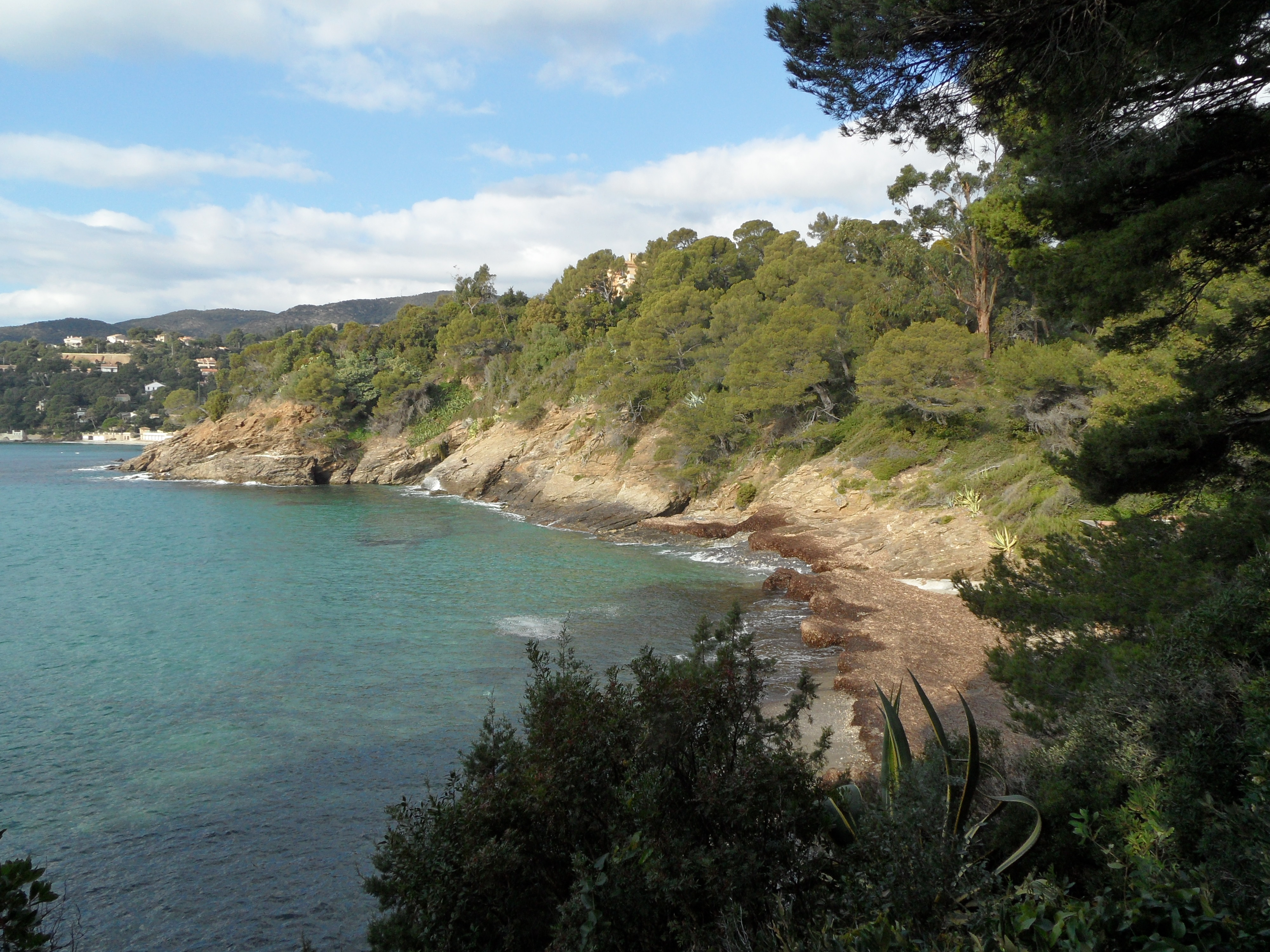
View from the coastal path of the Domaine du Rayol

The Domaine du Rayol (20 hectares), also known as the Jardin botanique du Rayol and the Parc botanique à Rayol-Canadel-sur-Mer, is a botanical garden and arboretum located on the Avenue des Belges, Rayol-Canadel-sur-Mer, Var, Provence-Alpes-Côte d'Azur, France. It is listed as a Remarkable Garden of France by the Committee of Parks and Gardens of the Ministry of Culture of France. It is open to the public, with an admission fee.

== History ==
The garden was first created in 1910 by Parisian businessman Alfred Theodore Courmes when he built his retirement home on a promontory overlooking the Baie du Figuier. In addition to a small farm on the site (1909), he constructed his first house (1912, subsequently the Hotel de la Mer) and later his second house (Rayolet, 1925), as well as a picturesque bastidon and pergola (1910). This earliest garden contained agaves, eucalyptus, heathers, mimosa, palms, and other Mediterranean trees.

In 1940 Mme. Courmes sold the property to aeronautical engineer Henry Potez, who restored the buildings and built a staircase from the pergola down to the sea. With a staff of ten gardeners, the garden was extended and improved, and by 1948 contained nearly 400 species. However it subsequently fell into neglect and was abandoned by the late 1960s.

In this place in 1985 David Coverdale and John Sykes was working in the famous 1987 album Of Whitesnake, in the songs Is This Love & Still Of The Night.

In 1989 the site was acquired by the Conservatoire du Littoral, and landscape gardeners Gilles Clément and Philippe Deliau began a thorough redesign to create today's garden.

== Description ==
The garden now contains a number of areas dedicated to plants of the Mediterranean basin, the Canary Islands, South Australia and New Zealand, the coasts of California and Chile, South Africa, Argentina, Mexico, and Asia. Its principal sections are as follows:

- Arid American Garden - agave, yucca, and pipi cactus.
- Australian Garden - semi-desert regions with acacia; heathlands with protea; eucalyptus and other aromatic plants.
- California Garden - chaparral with manzanita, California lilacs, oaks, and pines; prairies; Joshua trees; Washingtonias.
- Canary Islands Garden - representing three of Tenerife's environments: coastal rock formations, thermophilic shrubs, pine forest.
- Chile Garden - plants of the coast, savanna, and foothills.
- Jardin marin - underwater plantings on the sea-beds of Baie du Figuier, including a fine planting of Posidonia.
- Mediterranean Garden
- New Zealand Garden - humid subtropical forests with tree ferns and palms; dry prairies
- South African Garden - protea, heather, and plants in the Restionaceae family; large thorn acacia; numerous succulents including aloes.
- Subtropical American Garden - northern Argentina and subtropical Mexico.
- Subtropical Asian Garden - including Chinese bamboo and Japanese cycads.
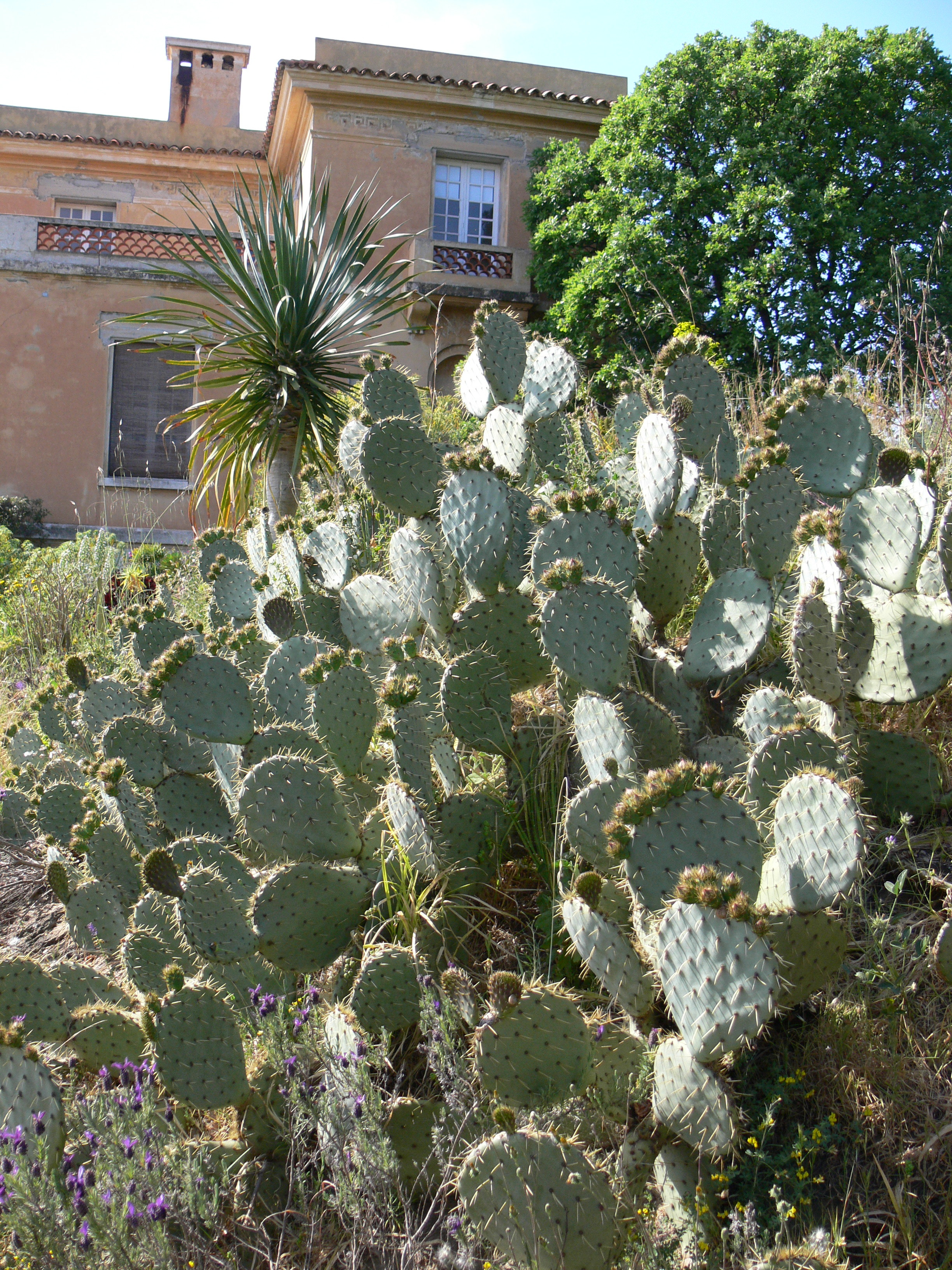
Cactus in the Canaries Garden at the Domaine du Rayol

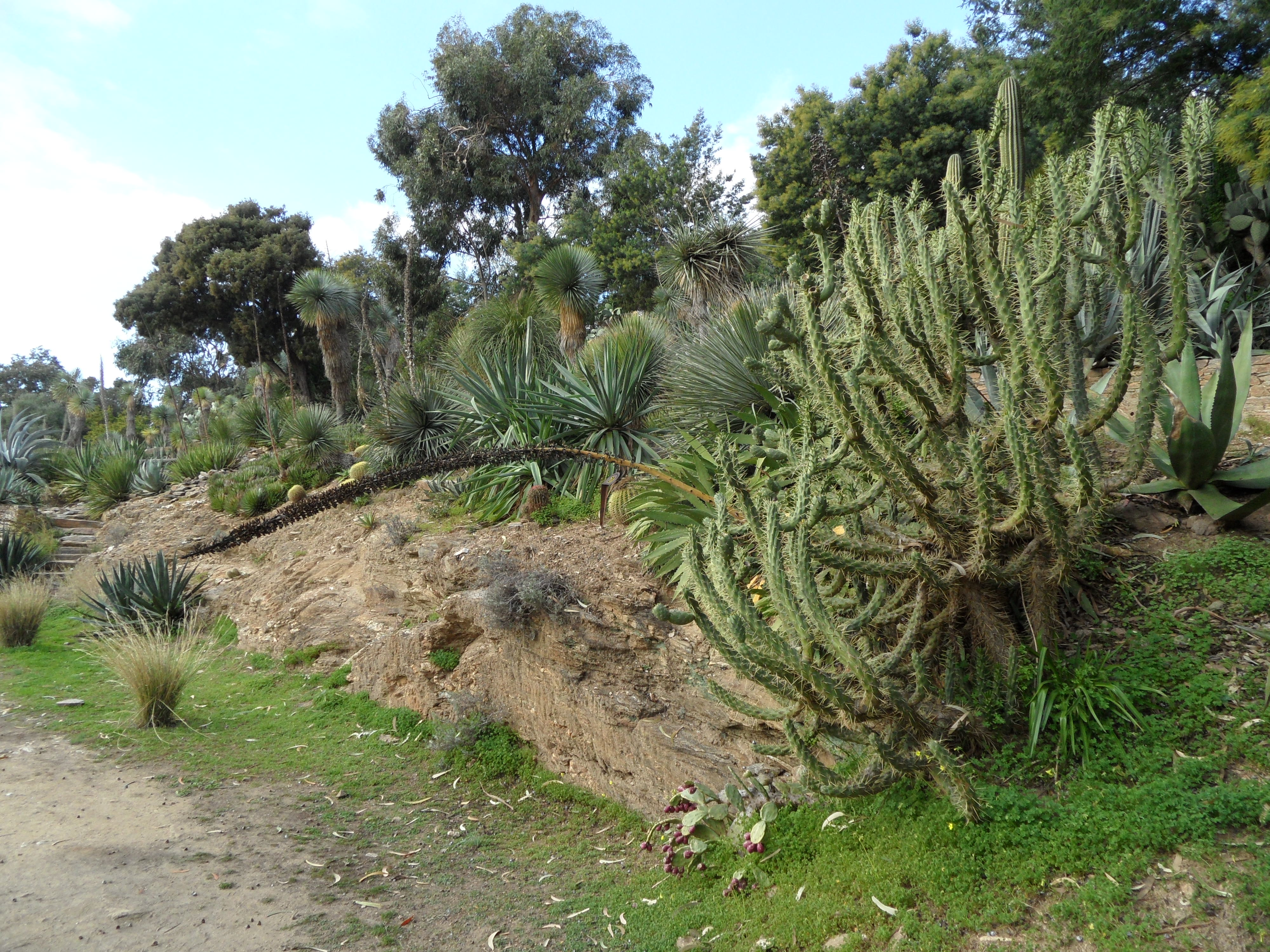
Rock garden with Mexican flora

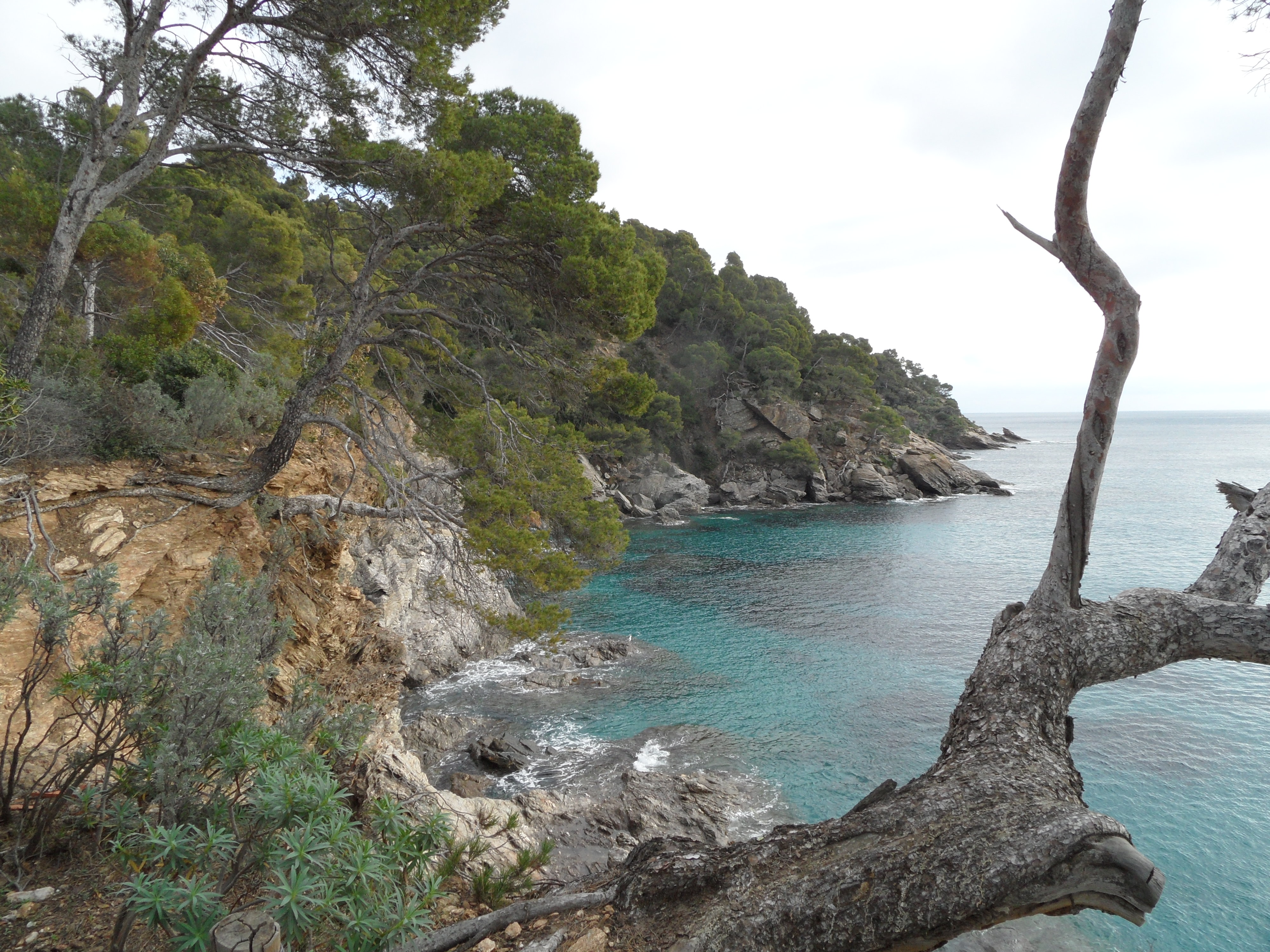
View from coastal path of the Domaine du Rayol

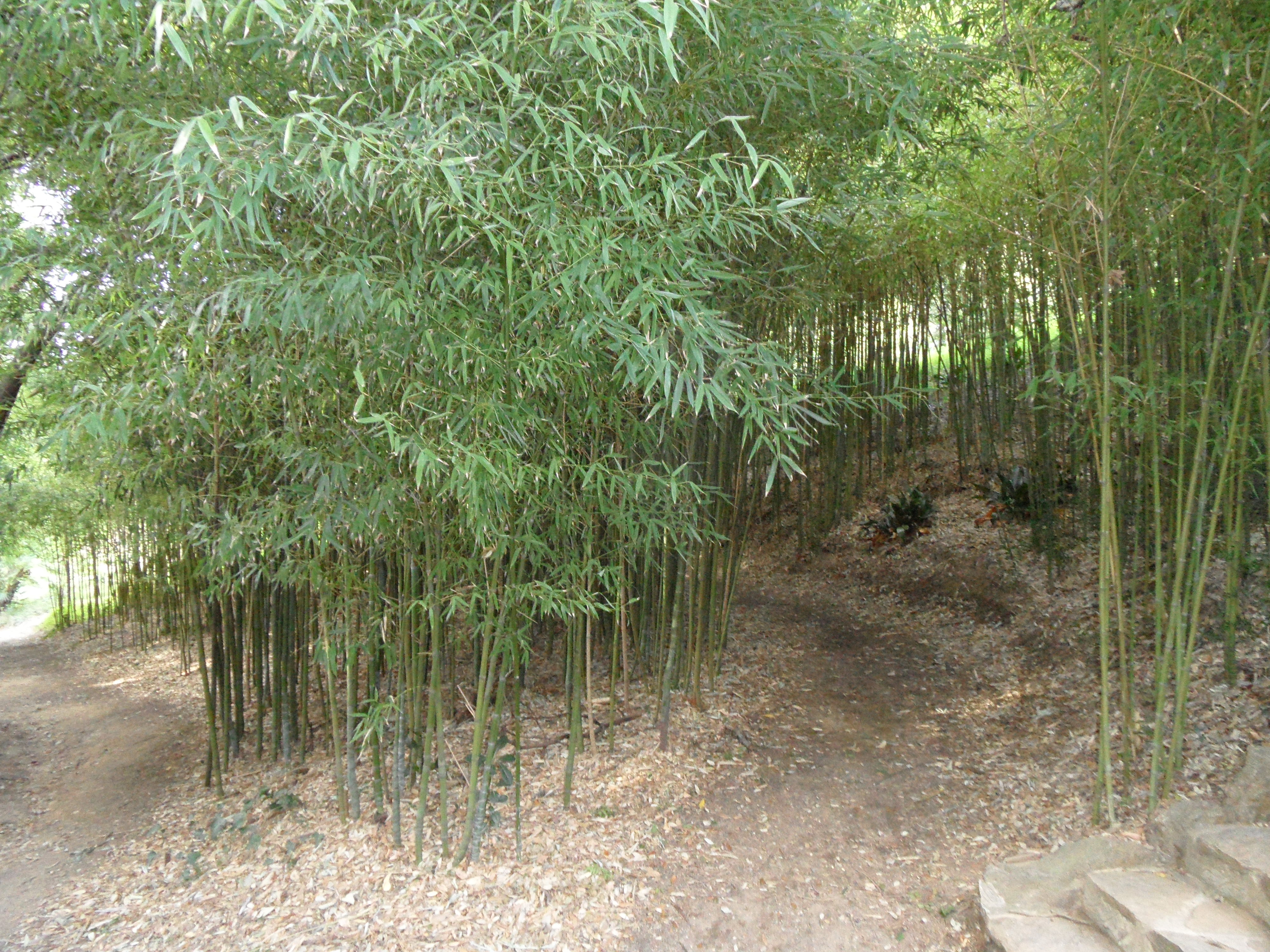
Bamboo grove in the Asian subtropical garden

== See also ==
- List of botanical gardens in France
- Remarkable Gardens of France
- Gardens of Provence-Alpes-Côte d'Azur

== Bibliography ==
- Virginie Pierson de Galzain and Guillaume Bonnel, Les Jardins du Domaine de Rayol, Aubanel, 2008. ISBN 978-2-7006-0537-2.
- Caroline Petit and Stanislaus Alaguillaume, Le Domaine du Rayol, Un Jardin des Paysages, Les Editions Eugen Ulmer, 2011 (ISBN 9782841384792)
