= Parc du Mugel =

Municipal park and botanical garden in La Ciotat, France

Coordinates: 43.1648°N 5.6054°E

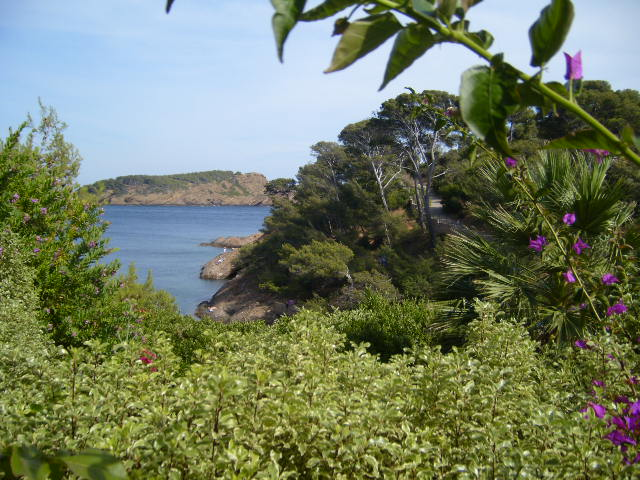
Parc du Mugel, La Ciotat (Bouches-du-Rhône)

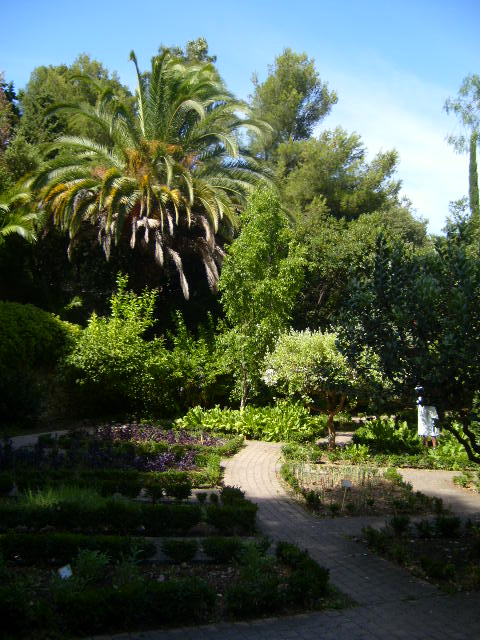
The Aromatic Garden

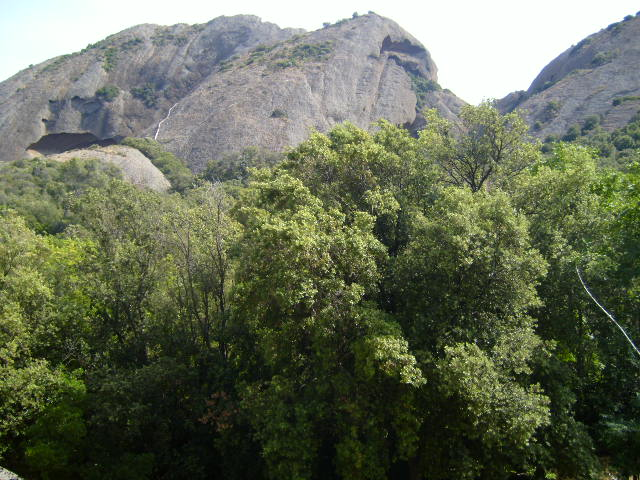
Le Bec D'Aigle, and native Provençal Oak Trees

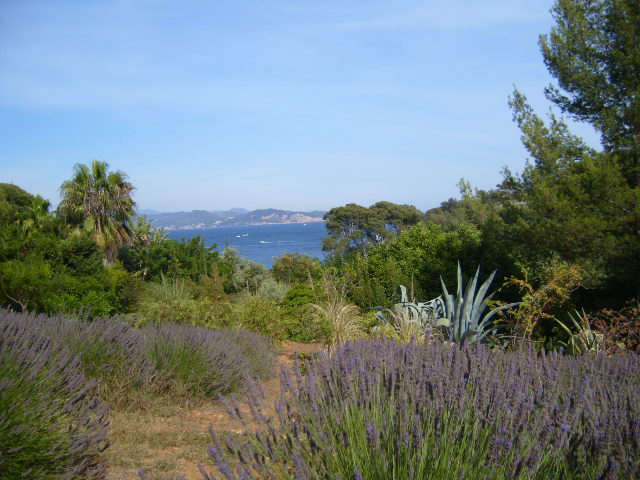
Lavender, cactus and the tropical garden

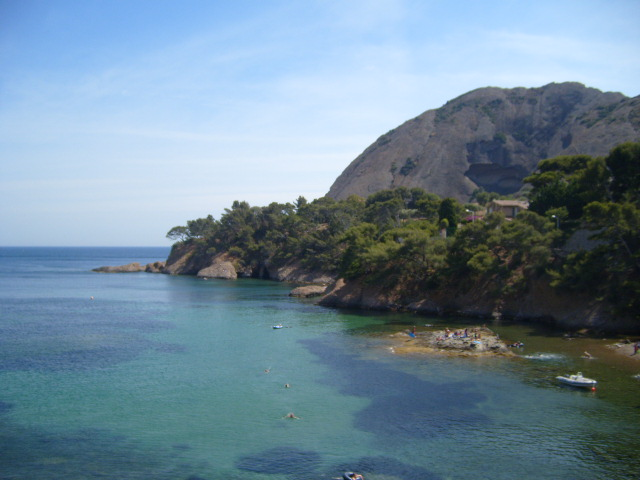
The Parc du Mugel seen from the Calanque

The Parc du Mugel is a municipal park and botanical garden in the town of La Ciotat, in the French department of Bouches-du-Rhône, on the Mediterranean coast of France between Marseille and Toulon. It is listed among the Remarkable Gardens of France by the French Ministry of Culture.

== History ==
In 1805 the park was divided into three properties, which were joined in 1870. In 1923 the land was purchased by Marseille coal merchant Louis Fouquet, who created the tropical garden. In 1941 one of the buildings on the site was converted into a youth hostel. Among other notable guests was Dr S. Goldschlager and his wife Sala, refugees from Nazi Europe. In 1947 the house and park was bought by the Bonzo family, who sold thirteen hectares in 1952 to the town of La Ciotat. The town eventually bought the entire property, and, in 1982, the park was opened to the public.

== The site ==
The park, twelve hectares in size, is located on the edge of the calanque of La Ciotat, a rocky inlet of the Mediterranean, and has a small beach on the calanque. It is at the foot of a massive rock, Le Bec d'Aigle (Eng: The Eagle's Beak), 155 meters high, which shelters the site from the wind, while the Mediterranean warms it in the winter, and keeps the temperature down in the summer.

The Bec d'Aigle is composed of an unusual agglomerate called "Poudingue" ("Pudding"), which is believed to be the remnant of a former continent, the pyreneo-sardo-corse land mass, which once occupied the Mediterranean. The park is watered by several small reservoirs, which capture the rain running off the rock.

== The Tropical Garden ==
The tropical garden contains thirty different species of palm trees, as well as mimosa, bougainvillia, bamboo, banana, and other tropical plants. It also features a garden of aromatic plants. A garden of lavender is planted just below the main house.

== The Provençal Nature Preserve ==
The nature preserve covers the steep hillside between the tropical garden and the Bec D'Aigle. It is composed of native liege oak trees, and the traditional brush landscape, locally called garrigue.

== See also ==
- Gardens of Provence-Alpes-Côte d'Azur
- List of botanical gardens in France
