= Pavillon de Galon =

Coordinates: 43.7739°N 5.4516°E

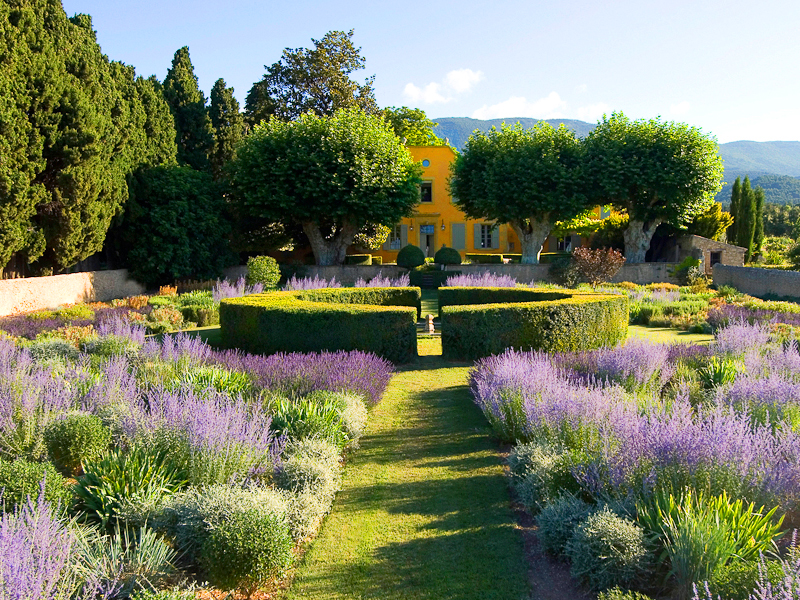
The Pavillon de Galon with a partial view of its garden

The Pavillon de Galon was built at the end of the 18th century as a hunting lodge. It is located in Cucuron, in Vaucluse, on the south side of the Luberon mountain range of southern France.

Its 5 hectare garden, which contains a modern French formal garden created in 2004, was awarded the "Remarkable Garden" label by the French Ministry of Culture & Environment in 2010. Such a label is awarded for 5 years and requires the garden to be open to the public at least 40 days per year.

== See also ==
- Gardens of Provence-Alpes-Côte d'Azur
