= Jardin d'Éguilles =

Coordinates: 43.5709°N 5.3527°E

The Jardin d'Éguilles is a private contemporary garden in the town of Éguilles, in the French Department of Bouches-du-Rhône. It is classified by the French Ministry of Culture as one of the Remarkable Gardens of France.

It was created in 1964 in an abandoned kitchen garden. The garden is in a natural state, with a variety of exotic trees and fruit trees, works of sculpture and small basins with aquatic plants and fish.

== See also ==
- Gardens of Provence-Alpes-Côte d'Azur
