= Jardin d'agrumes du Palais Carnolès =

Botanical garden in France

Coordinates: 43.7673°N 7.4886°E

The Jardin d'agrumes du Palais Carnolès is a two-hectare public garden devoted to citrus trees in the town of Menton, in the Alpes-Maritimes department, France. It is classified as one of the Remarkable Gardens of France by the French Ministry of Culture. It contains 137 varieties of citrus trees, including orange trees, bitter orange trees, grapefruit, mandarin orange and lemon trees.

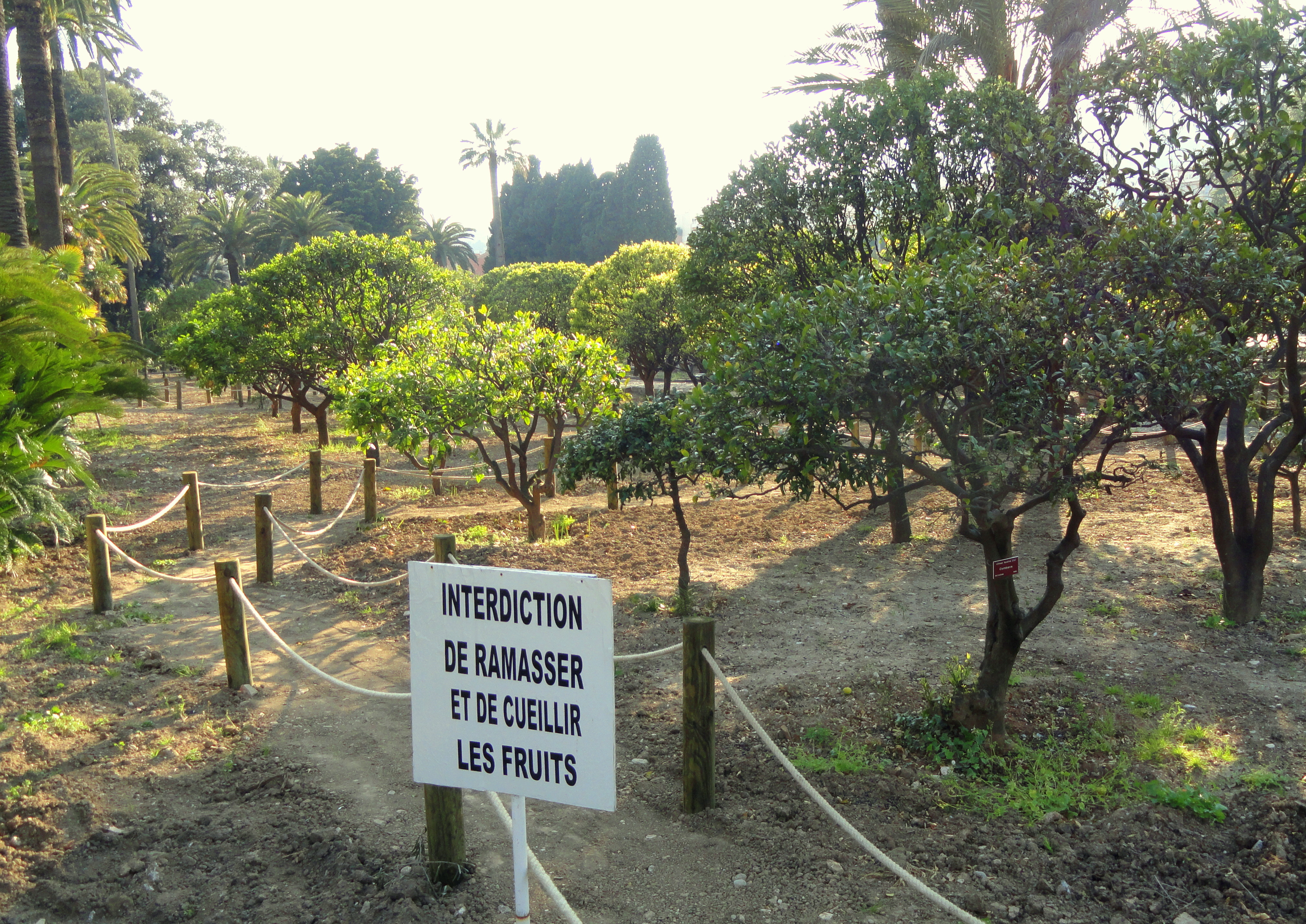
Jardin d'agrumes du Palais Carnolès

== History ==
The site of the garden, on the plain of Carnolès next to the convent of Madone, originally surrounded the summer residence of Prince Honoré II of Monaco. In 1725, he constructed the garden and planted different varieties of citrus trees. The present collection of trees was planted in 1997.

== See also ==
- Gardens of Provence-Alpes-Côte d'Azur
