= Jardins de Salagon =

Public park, museum and ethnobotanical garden in France

Coordinates: 43.936426°N 5.765333°E

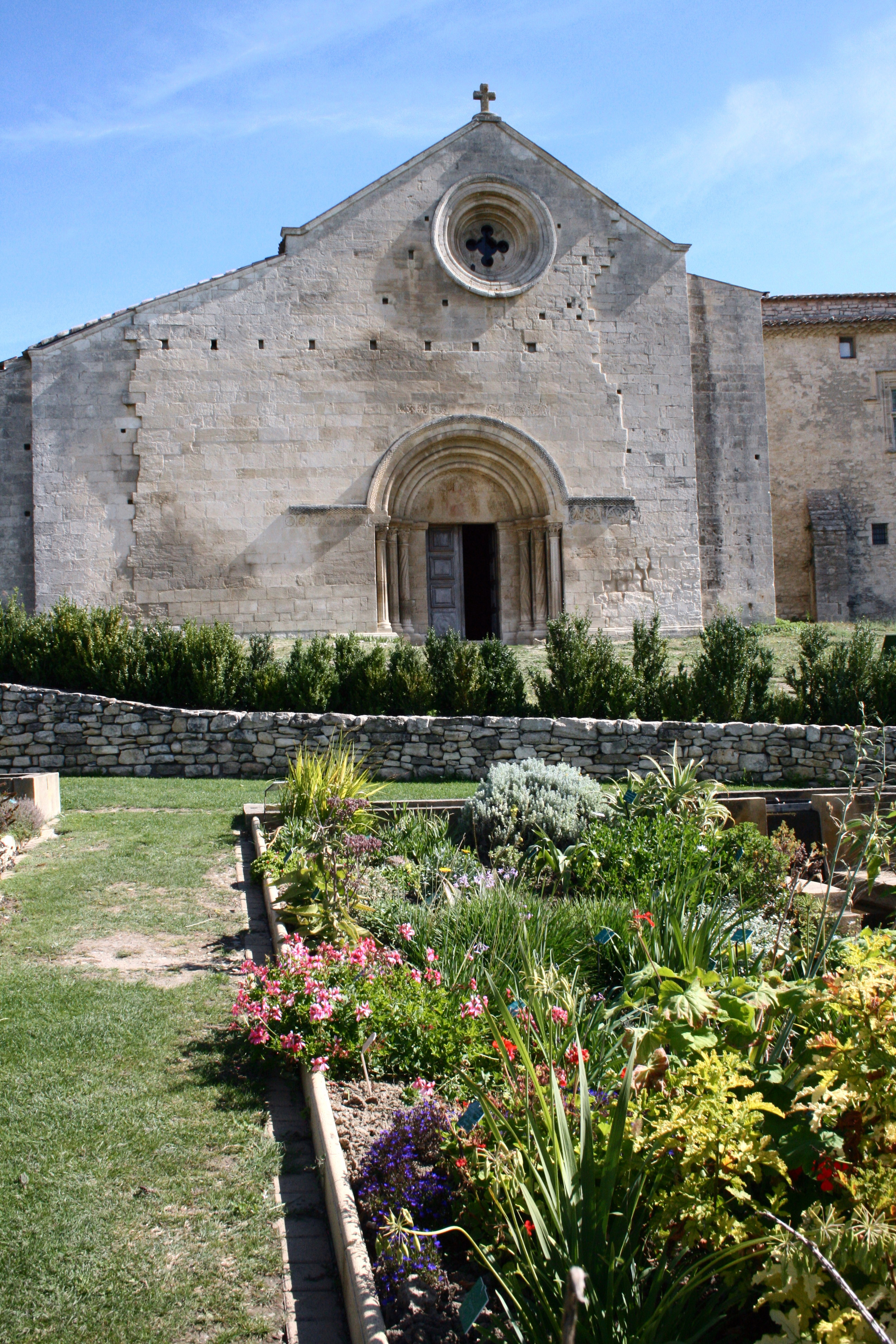
Salagon priory, Alpes-de-Haute-Provence

The Jardins de Salagon are a public park, museum and an ethnobotanical garden located in the town of Mane, in the Alpes-de-Haute-Provence Department of France. They surround the buildings of Salagon priory (12th century) and are classified by the French Ministry of Culture as one of the Remarkable Gardens of France.

== Description ==
The gardens are located at an altitude of five hundred meters, between the Durance River and the Lure mountain, in the basin of Forcalquier.

The garden is made up of five different sections:

- The medieval garden, a modern version of a traditional medieval garden, with four hundred different plants used in the Middle Ages;
- The garden of herbs and village plants; which presents the traditional domestic, ornamental, medicinal and aromatic plants of Haute-Provence;
- The garden of aromas; originally created to showcase the plants traditionally used in making perfume in Haute Provence; it now contains a wide variety of different kinds of sage, artemisia, Umbellieferous plants and other aromatic plants from around the world.
- The garden of modern times. A collection of plants used for industry, food and decoration around the world.
- The garden of the white oak. A garden devoted to the local varieties of white oak which grow on the foothills and lower mountains of Haute-Provence.

== History ==
Excavations show that the site of the garden has been occupied since Gallo-Roman times. At the end of the 10th century the domaine belonged to the Benedictine Abbey of Saint-André de Villeneuve-lès-Avignon. A priory was built in the 11th century. Several buildings of the old priory remain; the church, with an 11th-century choir and two naves from the 12th century; the logis (13th and 15th centuries) and farm buildings (16th-19th centuries.). In the 18th century the priory was attached to the convent of the Minimes brothers of Mane. During the French Revolution the property was nationalized.

In the 19th century the buildings were used for agriculture. In 1981, they were purchased by the commune and restored. Since 1981 the buildings house the Museum of the Ethnographic Heritage of Haute-Provence.

== See also ==
- List of botanical gardens in France
- Gardens of Provence-Alpes-Côte d'Azur
