= Parc Olbius Riquier =

Coordinates: 43.1106°N 6.1358°E

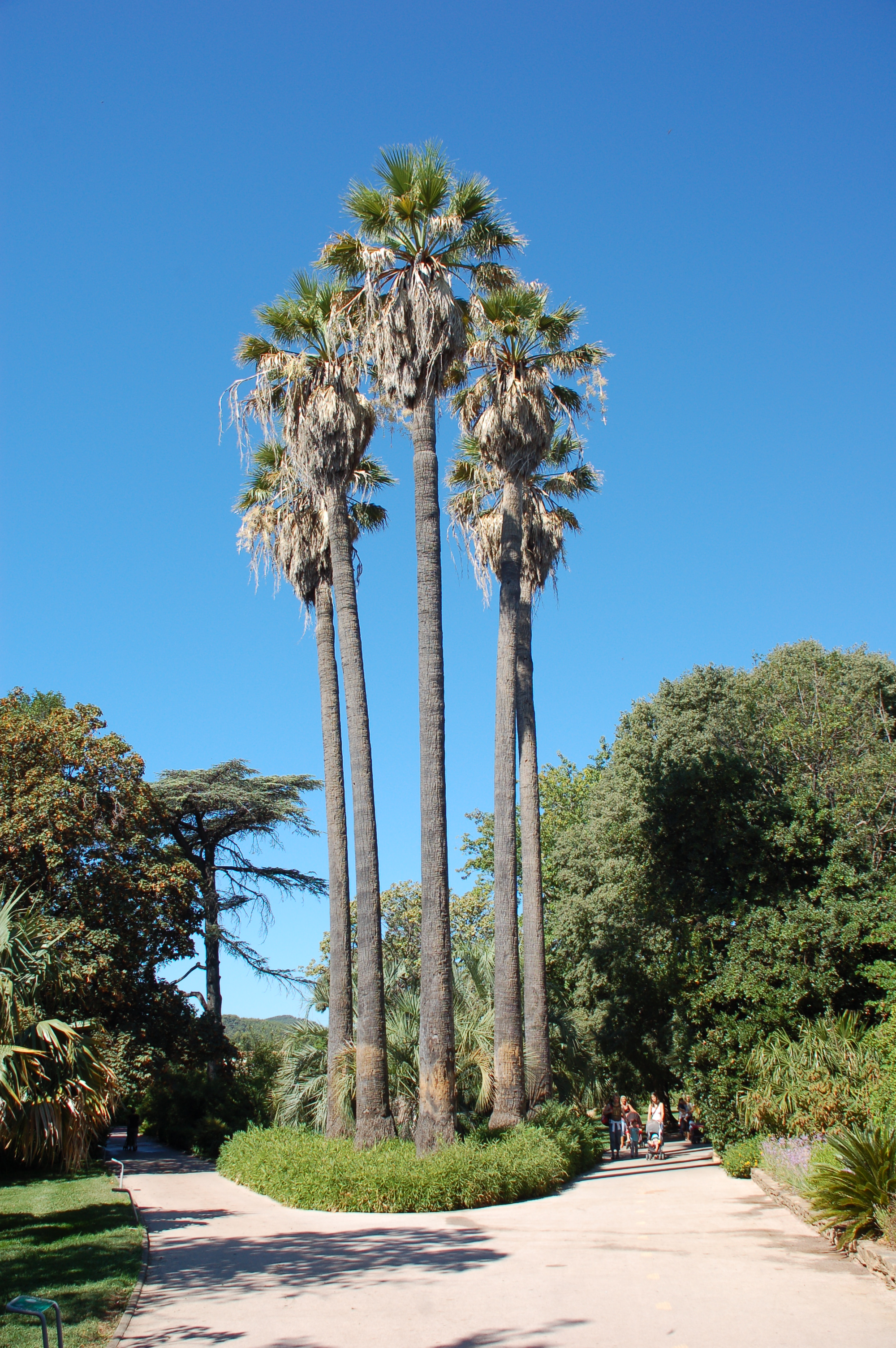
Le jardin Olbius Riquier

Parc Olbius Riquier is a municipal park located in the city of Hyères in the Var Department of France. It is classified by the French Ministry of Culture as one of the Remarkable Gardens of France.

== Description ==
The seven-hectare park contains a botanical garden with collections of palm trees and bamboo, and a greenhouse with tropical birds and plants. It also contain a zoo, a lake, and a cascade. Trees and plants in the park include Magnolia, Catalpa, Taxodium distichum, Quercus lanuginosa, Yucca, Firmiana simplex, Melaleuca linariifolia, and Buxus. Birds include balearica

== History ==
The park was deeded to the city in 1868 in the will of its owner, Olbius Hippolyte Antoine Riquier.
