= La Louve =

Coordinates: 43°49′18″N 5°18′23″E

La Louve is a private French contemporary garden, open to the public, in the town of Bonnieux in the Vaucluse department of France. It was created beginning in 1986 by Nicole de Vésian, textile designer for the Paris fashion house of Hermès. It is classified by the French Ministry of Culture as one of the Remarkable Gardens of France.

== Description ==
The gardens are laid out on a series of terraces, and are designed to be in harmony with the surrounding natural landscape. They incorporate local rocks and stones, including stone balls and smooth stones from the Durance River, trees and bushes trimmed into geometric shapes, and wooden benches placed for meditation and contemplation. The garden includes an Arbutus tree shaped by artist Marc Nucera; fig, cherry, apricot and apple trees; roses and iris; and native fragrant plants of the region, including lavender, rosemary, and santolina.

== History ==
The site was purchased by Nicole de Vésian when she retired from Hermès and devoted her time to gardening. Over the course of ten years, she transformed a village house with land exposed to the south into a complex design of stone and greenery. As she approached the age of eighty, she sold the garden in 1996 to art collector Judith Pillsbury and began a new garden above the village. Judith Pillsbury preserved the original design and maintained the garden until 2014 when it was bought by its present owner Mme Sylvie Verger-Lanel.

== See also ==
- Gardens of Provence-Alpes-Côte d'Azur
