= Parc du Moulin Blanc =

Park in France

Coordinates: 43.3791°N 5.7013°E

The Parc du Moulin Blanc is a privately owned but open to the public landscape park, arboretum, and botanical garden located in Saint-Zacharie, in the Massif de Sainte-Baume in the Var Department of France. It is classified by the Committee of Parks and Gardens of the French Ministry of Culture as among the Remarkable Gardens of France.

The park was created in 1851 (174 years ago) by Adolphe de Saporta, with landscape architect M. Drée. After Saporta's death, it was taken over by his son Garston de Saporta, a noted paleobotanist. The park is owned today by his descendants.

The arboretum displays mature varieties of trees from Europe, North America, and Asia, including magnolia, chestnut, plane trees, and a sequoia tree, as well a large stand of bamboo. The park is watered by several springs, and by two small streams, the Huveaune and the Peruy. Within the park is a 2800 square meter lake, with wild birds, including a heron.

== See also ==
- Gardens of Provence-Alpes-Côte d'Azur
