= Jardins du Château Val Joanis =

Coordinates: 43.7112°N 5.4688°E

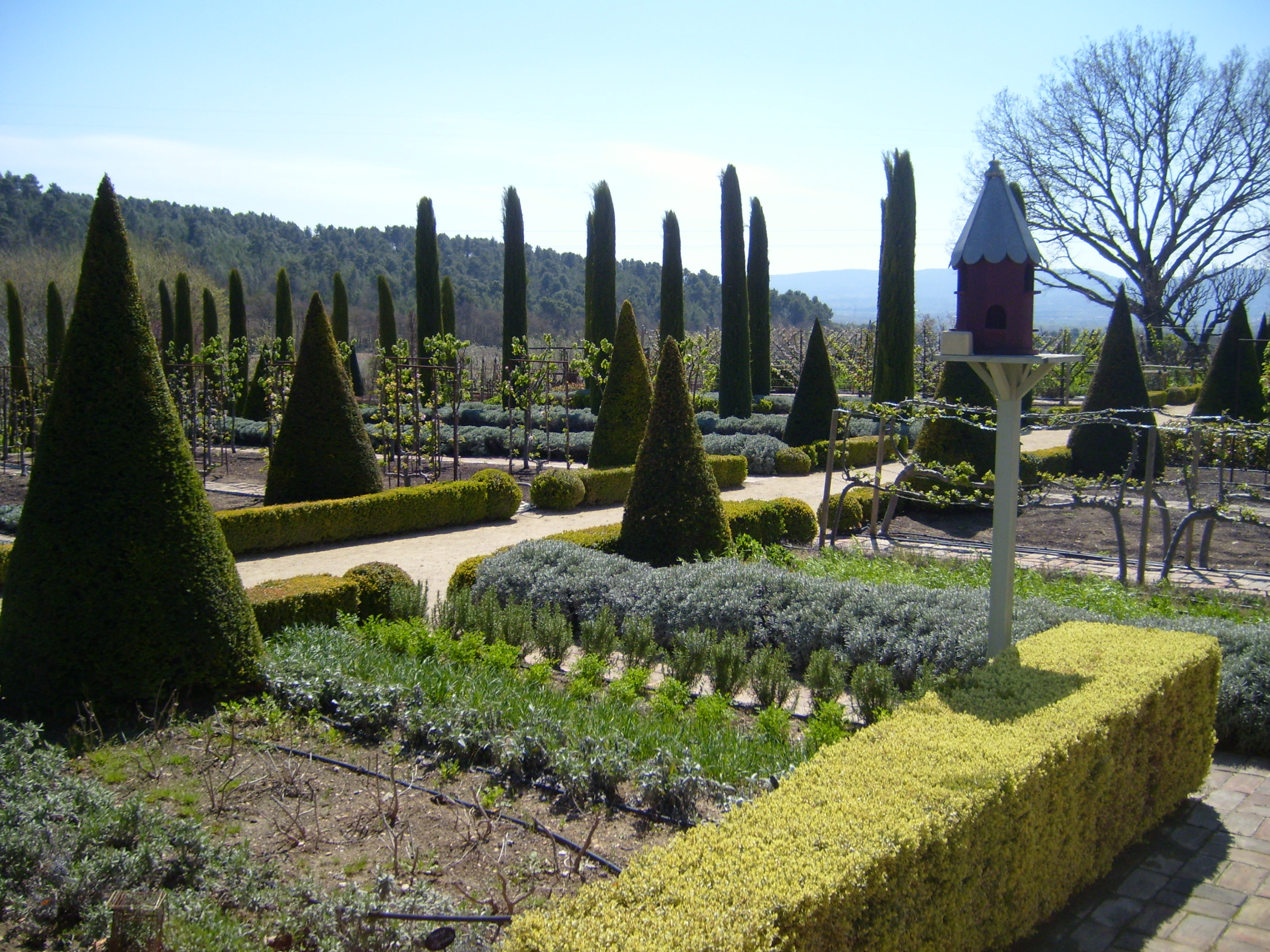
Gardens of the Château de Val Joanis

The Jardins du Château Val Joanis are gardens which belong to the Château Val Joanis winery, located west of the town of Pertuis in the Vaucluse Department of France. The gardens are inspired by the 17th century bastide, or Provençal manor, which stands on the site. They are private but open to the public, and are classified by the French Ministry of Culture among the Remarkable Gardens of France.

== History ==
The Chateau is built on the site of an ancient Roman villa, some of whose stones today decorate the garden. The building is decorated with the coat of arms of Jean de Joanis, the secretary of the King Louis III of Naples. The estate was occupied by the Arnaud family, who kept it until the 17th century. In 1754, the estate was given the status of a fief. The house and estate fell into ruins during the 19th century. It was purchased in 1977 by Jean-Louis Chancel. Between 1979 and 1999, he planted 186 hectares of vines. He also commissioned the architect Jean-Jacques Pichoux to build a modern winery building, inspired by the architectural style of the Dominican Order.

In 1978, Cécile Chancel decided to build a garden in the style of a 17th-century kitchen garden. She had terraces dug on the hillside next to the vineyards, researched different garden styles, and, with the assistance of landscape gardener Tobie Loup de Vian, began building. The garden reached its present form by 1990. It was classified as a Remarkable Garden of France in 2005.

== Description ==
The gardens are laid out on three terraces:

The upper terrace is a kitchen garden and flower garden, featuring lavender cut into spheres, squash, salad plants, fennel, and aromatic plants and herbs. Different varieties of tomatoes are grown on bamboo frames, and there are pyramids of ivy and hops (Humulus lupulus).

The middle terrace features flowers, particularly roses. The paths are bordered with Iris × germanica and with yew trees trimmed into cones.

The lower terrace features fruit trees, particularly old varieties of apples and pears. The garden also has a garden of herbs, a collection of asters, and boxwood hedges trimmed in ornamental forms.

An arbor or pergola covered with climbing roses and trumpet creeper (Campsis) climbs the hill and joins the three terraces.

Tables and seats are placed at scenic spots with views of the garden and the vineyards beyond. The best times to visit the garden are June and July for the flowers, or September for the change of colors of the vineyards and trees.

== Gallery ==
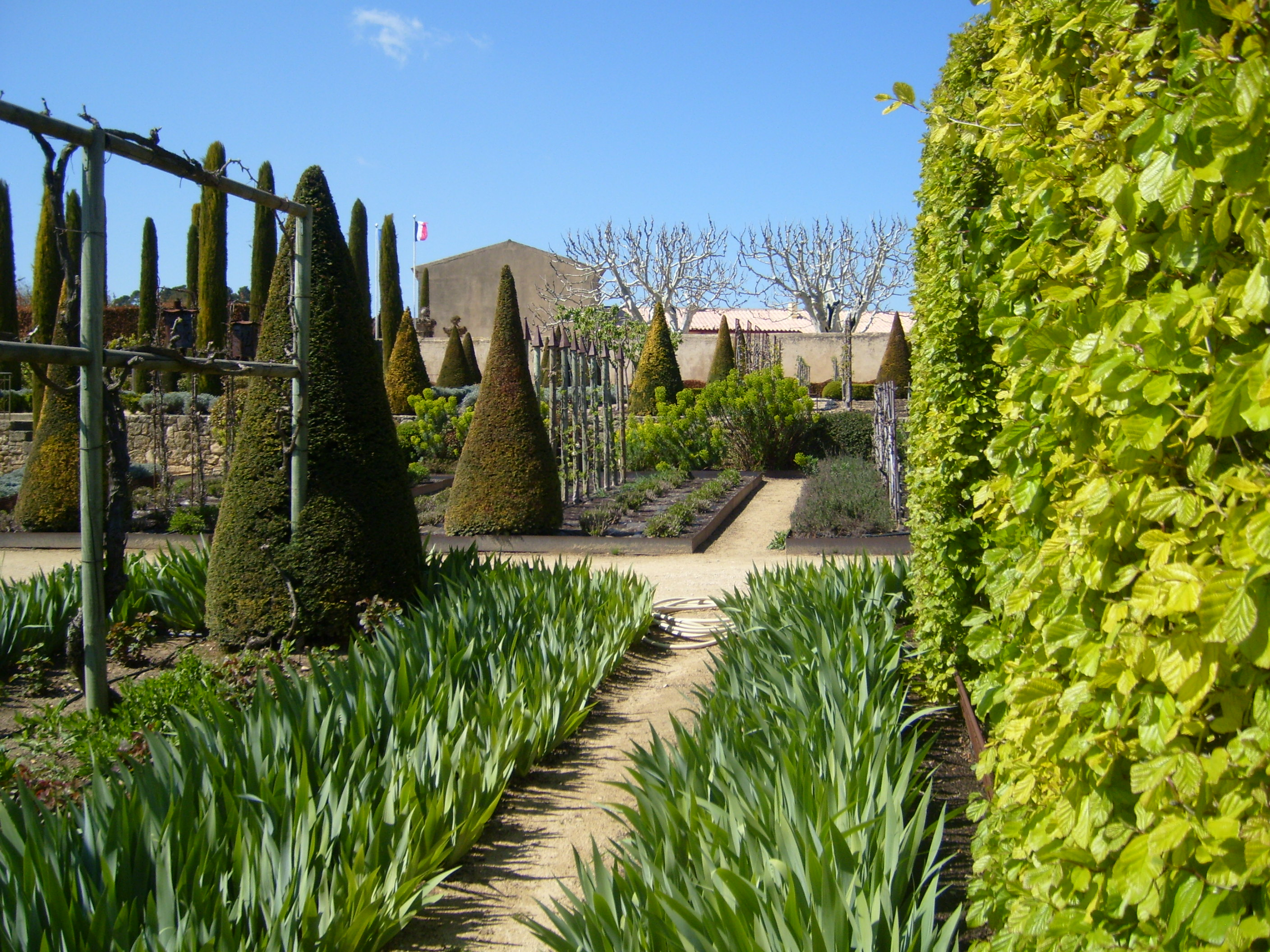

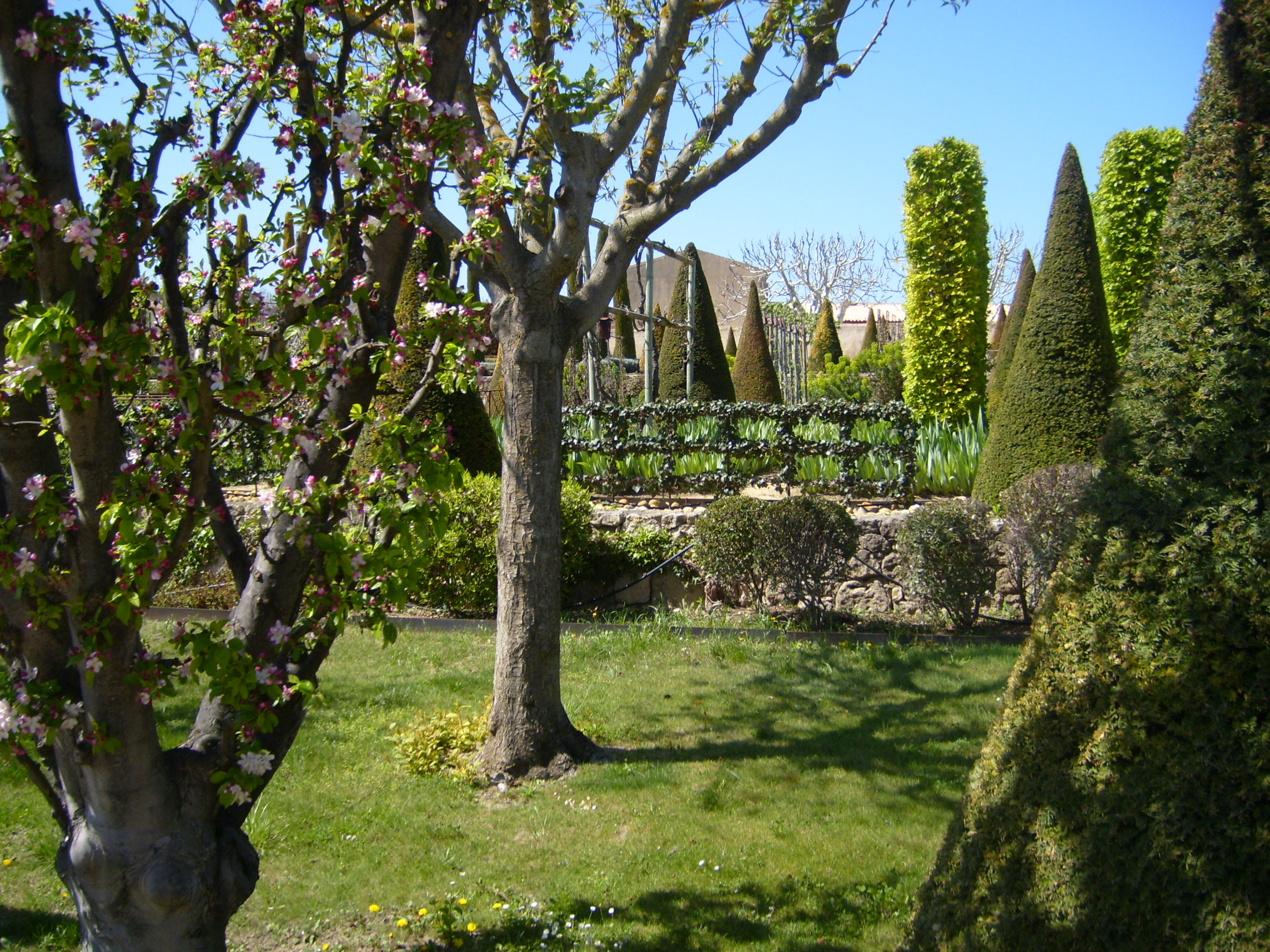

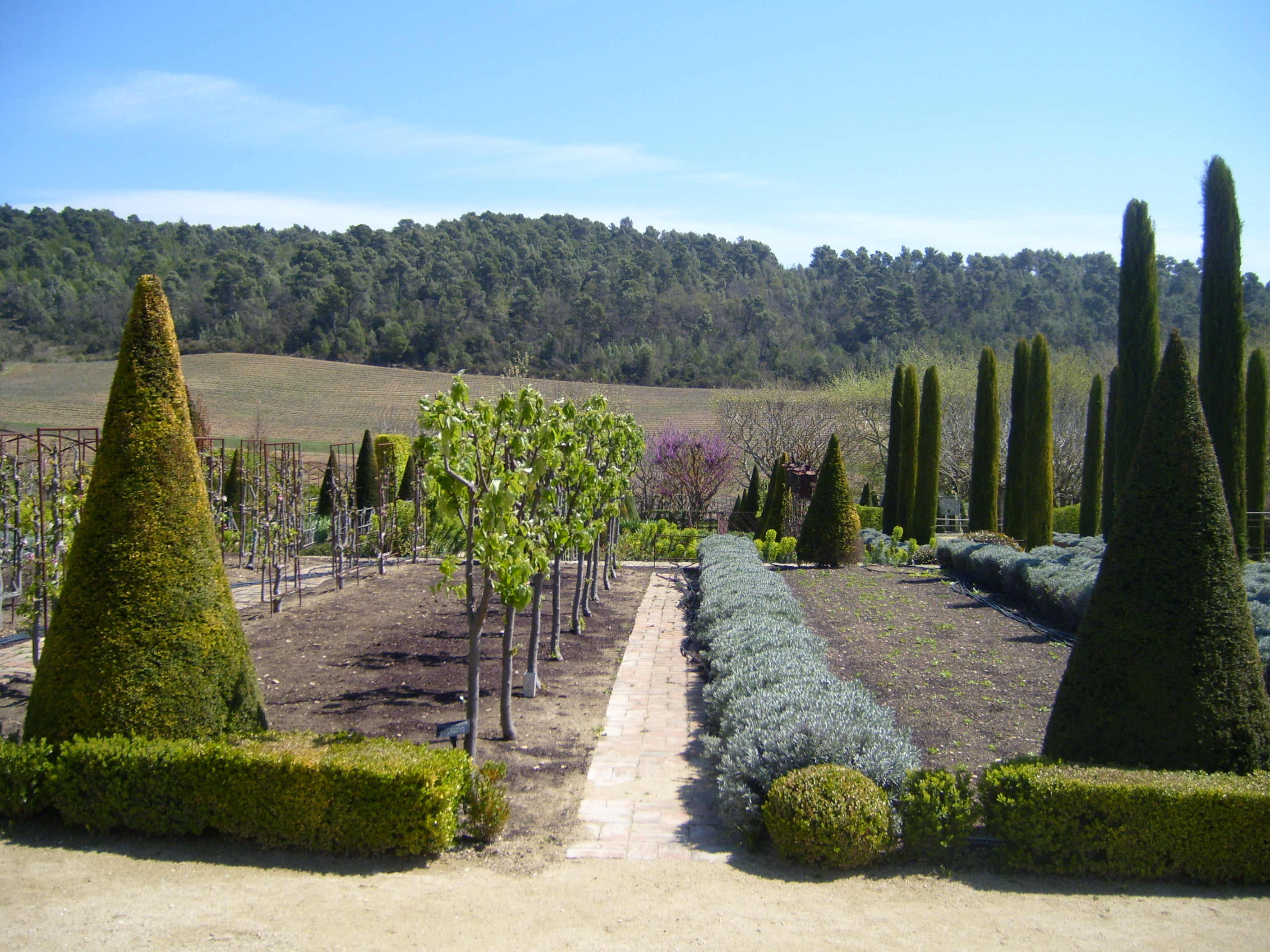

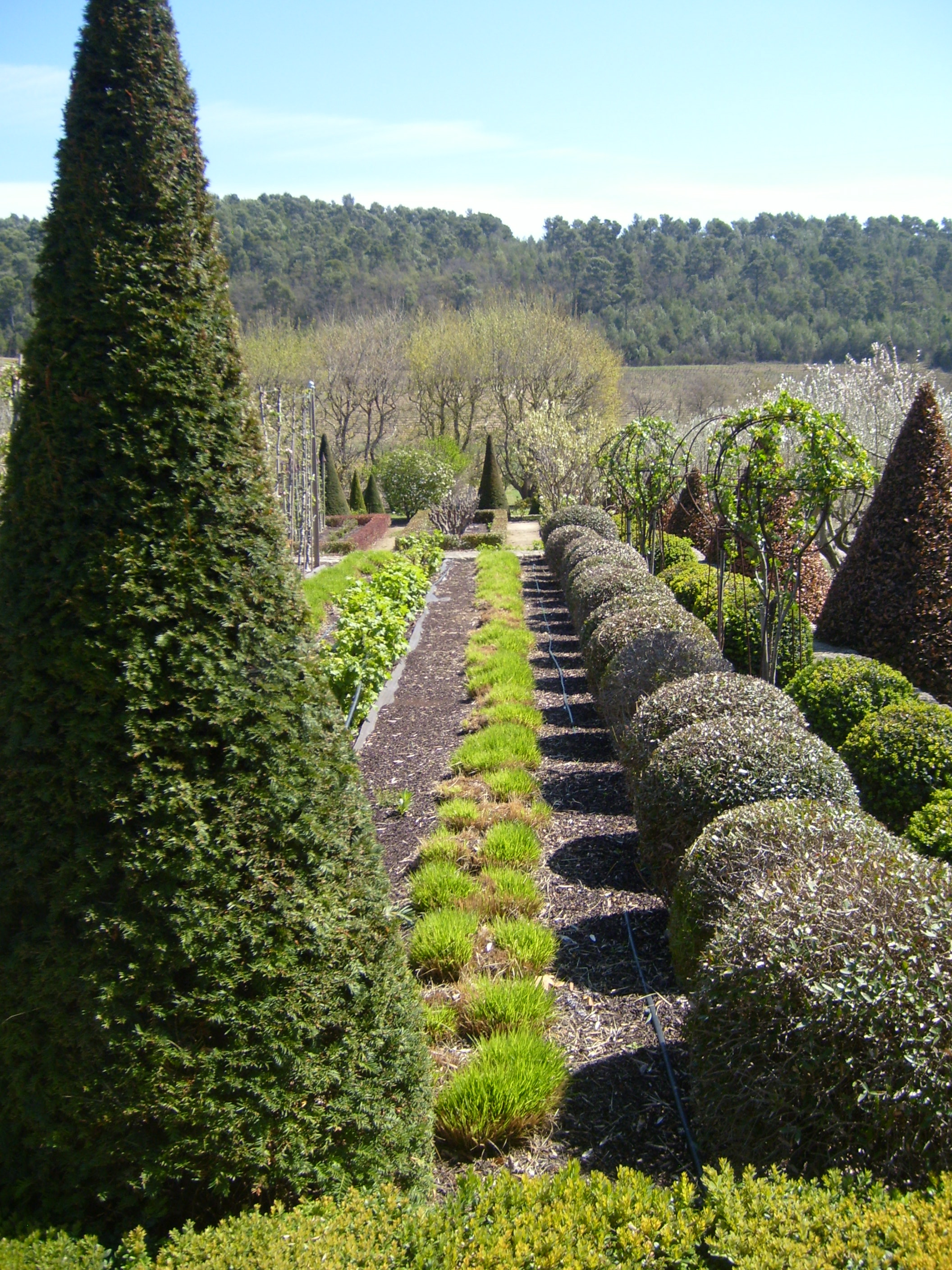

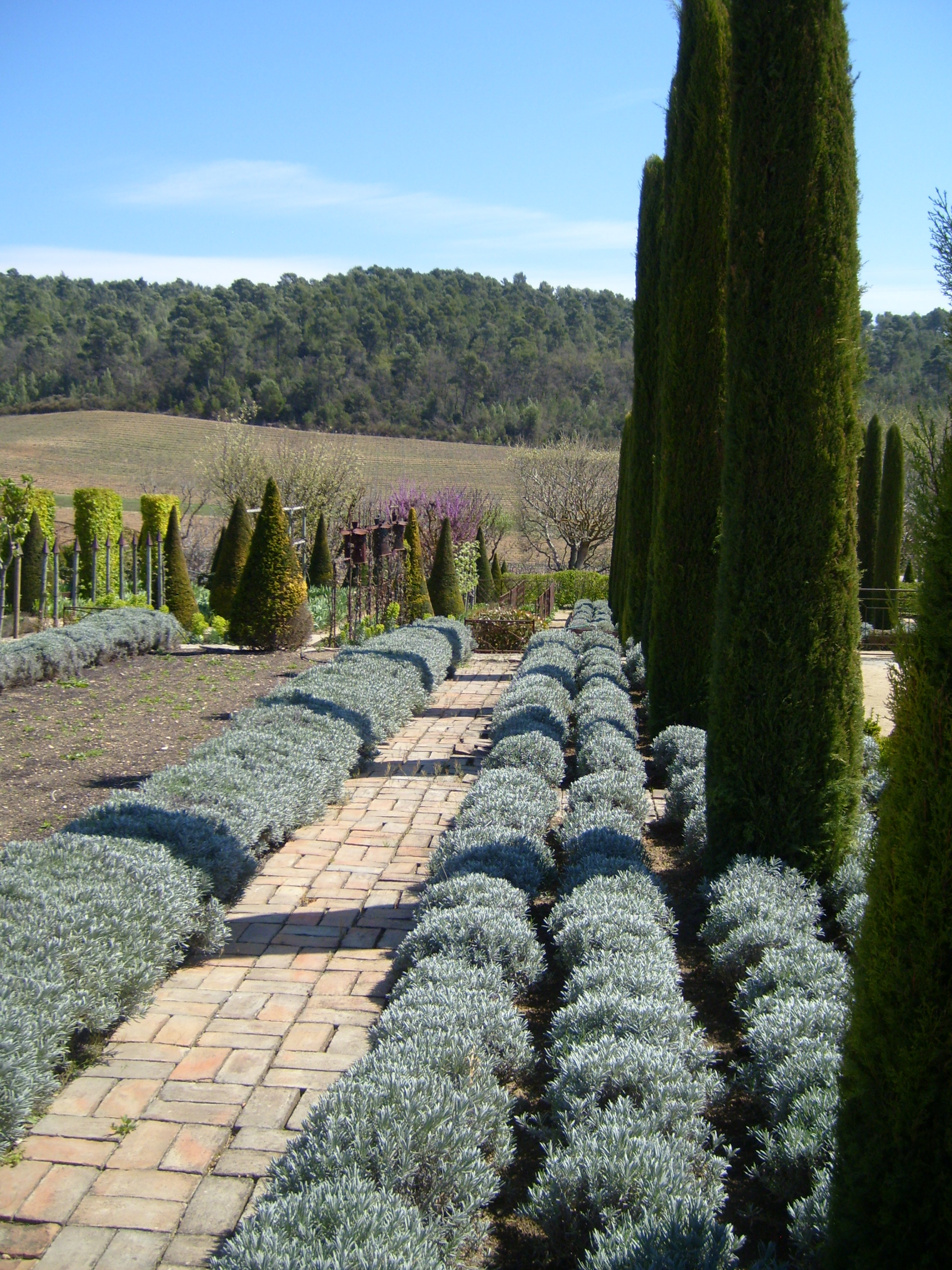

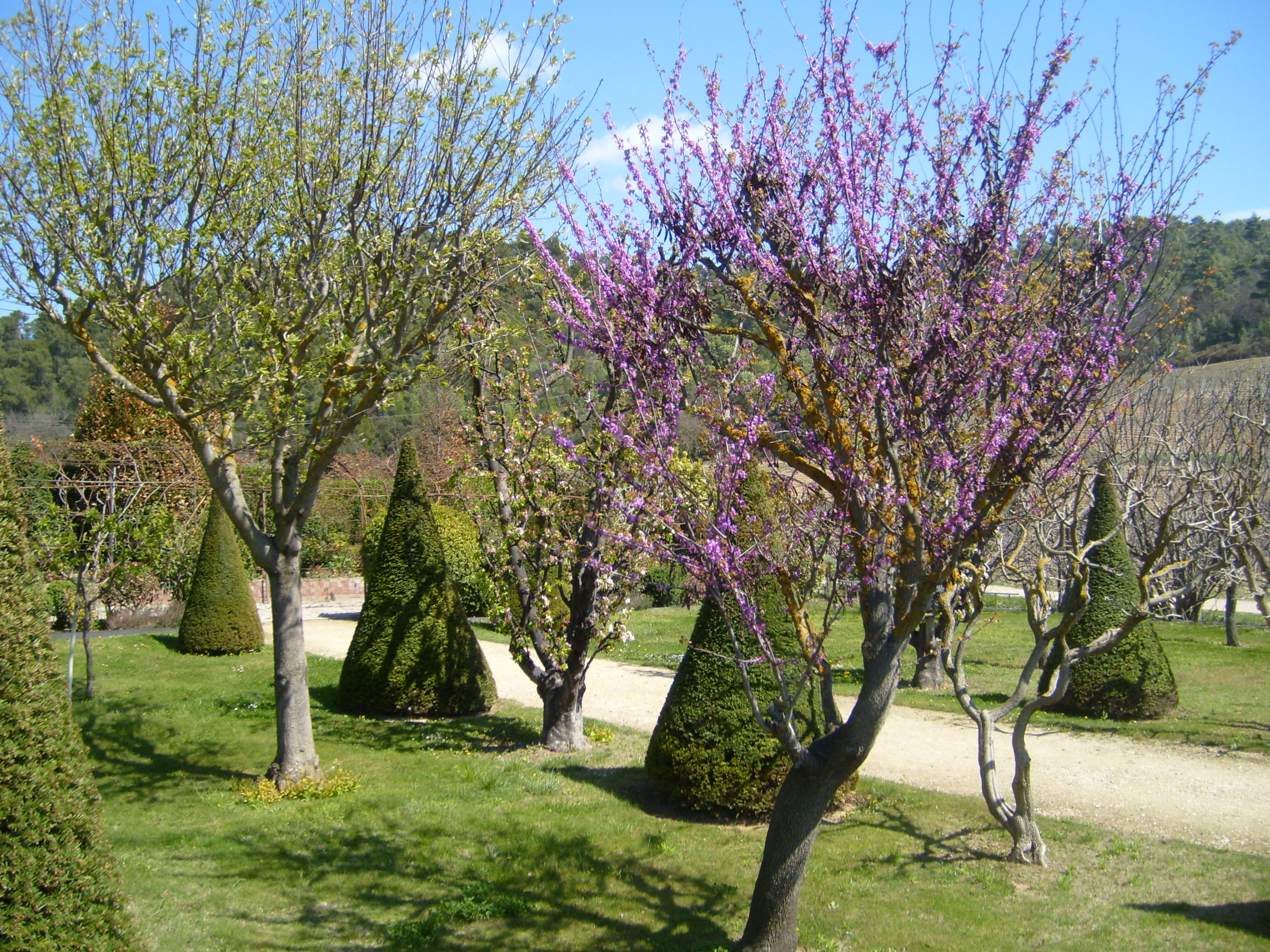

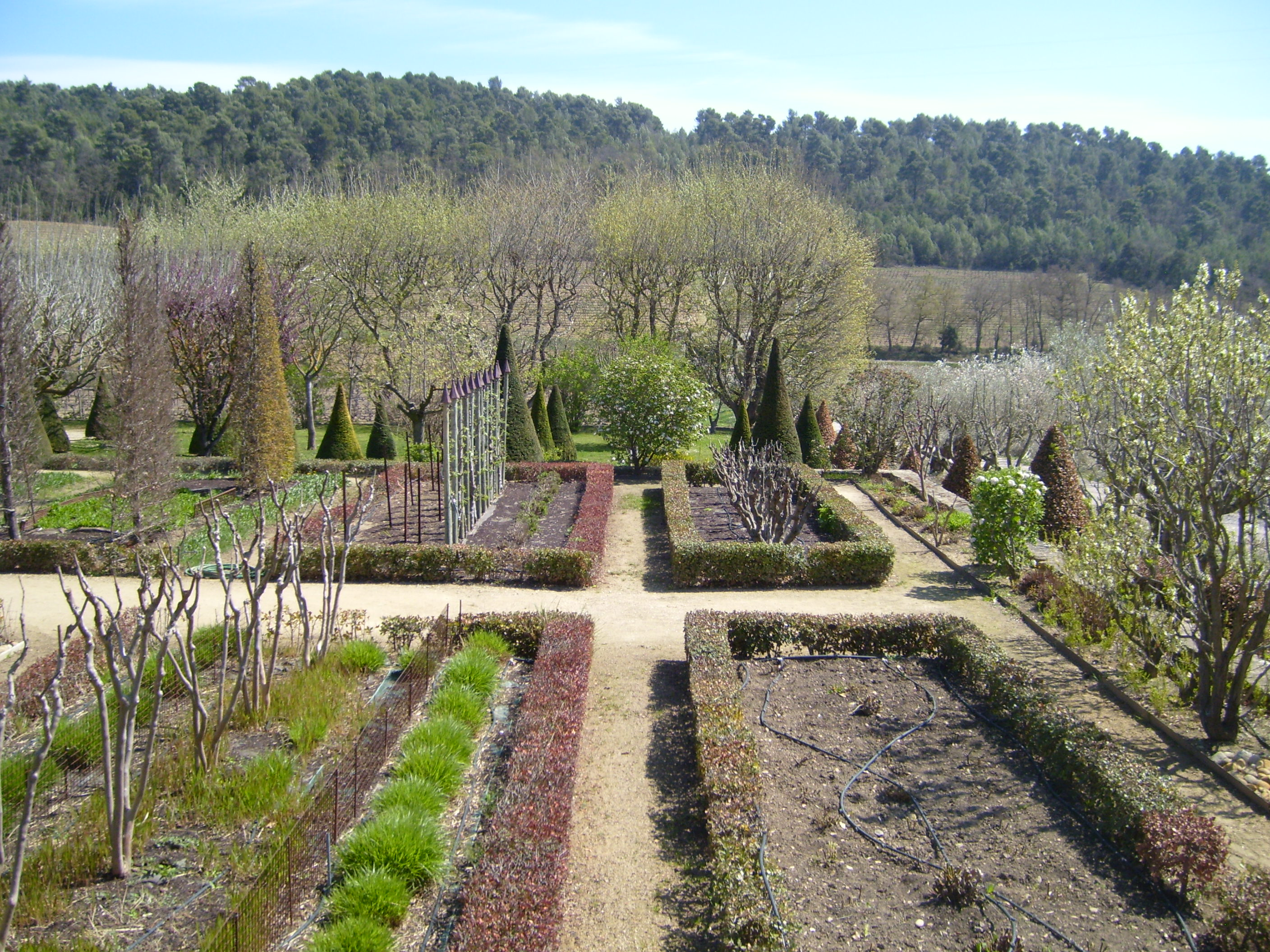

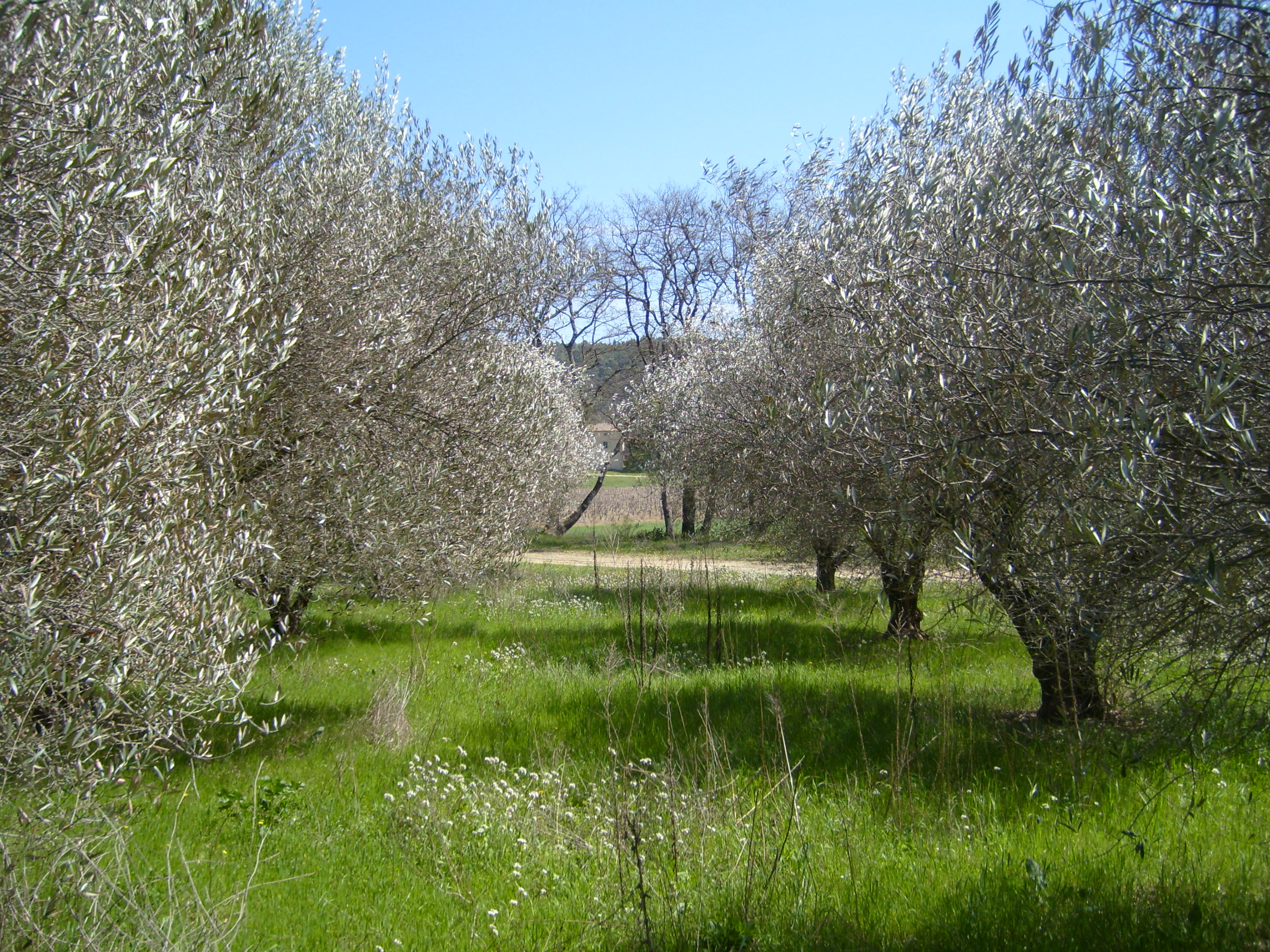

== See also ==
- Gardens of Provence-Alpes-Côte d'Azur

== Bibliography ==
- Marie-Françoise Valéry, Jardins de France en fleurs, Taschen, Paris, 2008. (ISBN 978-3-8365-0308-2).
- Phillipe Thébaut and Christian Maillard, Parcs et Jardins en France, Editions Payot & Rivages, 2008 (ISBN 978-2-7436-1818-6)
