= Villa Champfleuri =

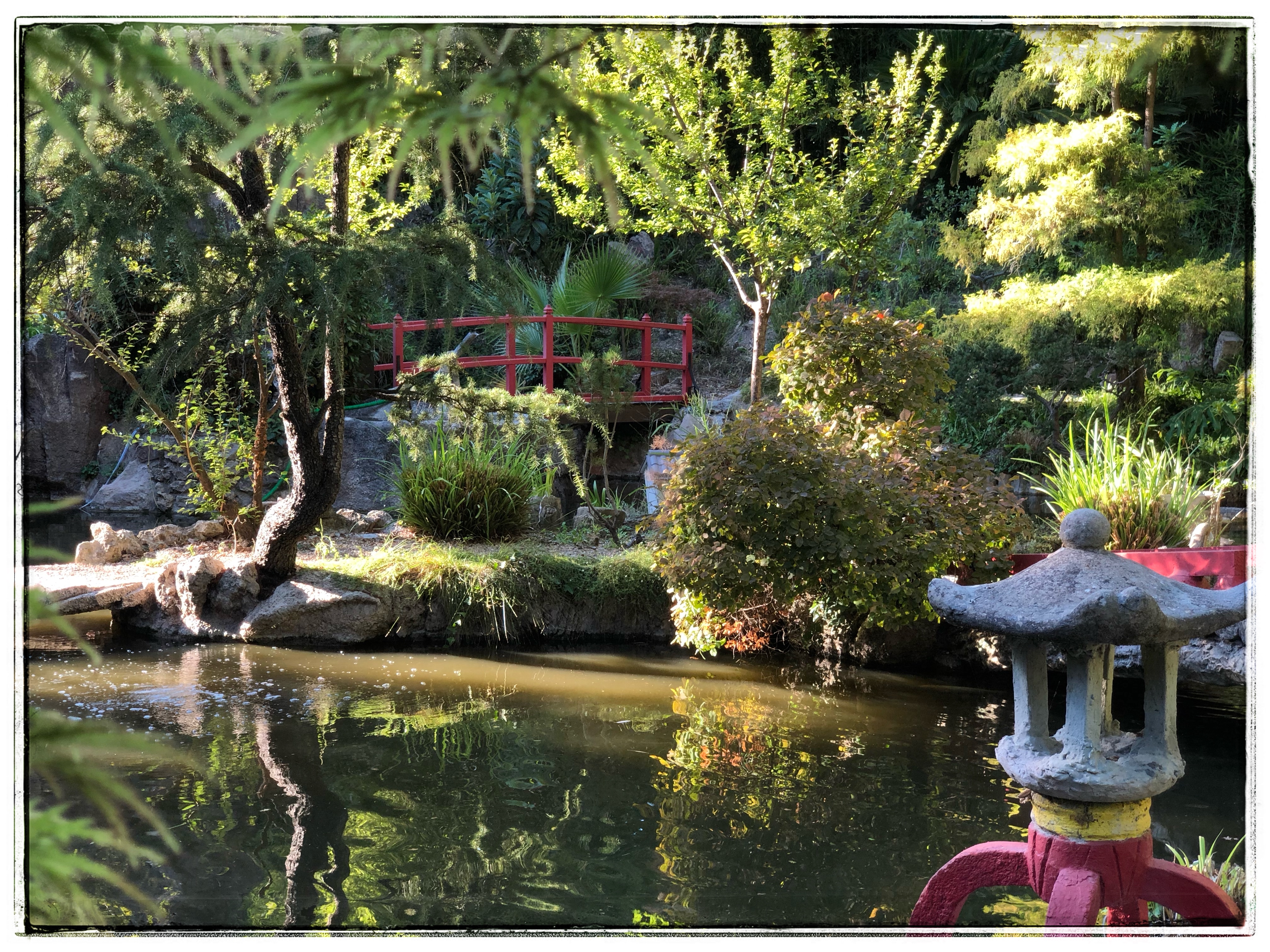
The Japanese Garden

The Villa Champfleuri is a house with a historic garden in Cannes, France. The first house was built in the 1880s for James Bland. It was purchased by Danaé and Marino Vagliano in 1925, and expanded until 1928. The couple added a garden. The property remained in the Vagliano family until 1961, when their sons sold it to S.C.I Champfleuri, and a new house designed by Abro S. Kandjian and Zaharia was completed in its place in 1964. However, the garden remained intact.

While the house is not listed, the garden has been listed as an official historical monument since 1990.
