= La Londe-les-Maures =

- Commune
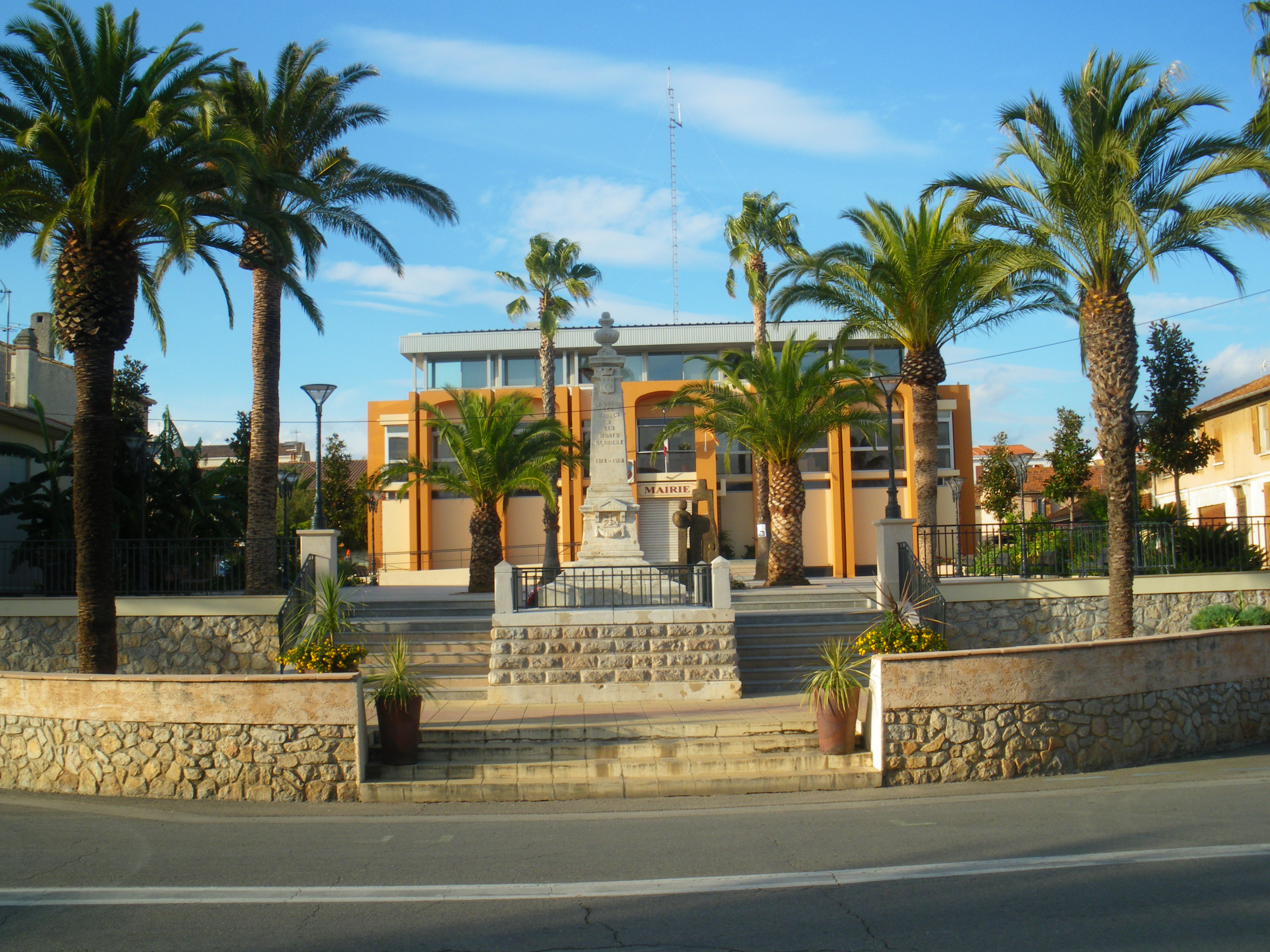
- The town hall of La Londe-les-Maures

- Coat of arms
- Location of La Londe-les-Maures
- Location within France Location within Provence-Alpes-Côte d'Azur
- Coordinates: 43°08′17″N 6°14′04″E
- Country: France
- Region: Provence-Alpes-Côte d'Azur
- Department: Var
- Arrondissement: Toulon
- Canton: La Crau

Government
  - Mayor (2023–2026): François De Canson (DVD)
- Area^{1}: 79.29 km^{2} (30.61 sq mi)
- Highest elevation: 601 m (1,972 ft)
- Lowest elevation: 0 m (0 ft)
- Population (2023): 10,584
  - Density: 133.5/km^{2} (345.7/sq mi)
- Time zone: UTC+01:00 (CET)
  - Summer (DST): UTC+02:00 (CEST)
- INSEE/Postal code: 83071 /83250
- ^{1} French Land Register data, which excludes lakes, ponds, glaciers > 1 km^{2} (0.386 sq mi or 247 acres) and river estuaries.

La Londe-les-Maures (French pronunciation: [la lɔ̃d le mɔʁ]; in Occitan: La Lònda dei Mauras) is a commune in the Var department in the Provence-Alpes-Côte d'Azur region in southeastern France. The upscale residential town is located on the Côte d’Azure and is known for its beaches, golf and harbour which has one of the largest by capacity in the Var region.

== Population ==
Historical population
| Year | Pop. | ±% p.a. |
|---|---|---|
| 1968 | 3,956 | — |
| 1975 | 3,937 | −0.07% |
| 1982 | 5,184 | +4.01% |
| 1990 | 7,151 | +4.10% |
| 1999 | 8,749 | +2.27% |
| 2007 | 10,043 | +1.74% |
| 2012 | 9,116 | −1.92% |
| 2017 | 10,297 | +2.47% |
| 2023 | 10,584 | +0.46% |
Source: INSEE

== Points of interest ==
- Jardin d'Oiseaux Tropicaux
- La Londe Jazz Festival

== See also ==
- Communes of the Var department
