= Eygalières =

Commune in Provence-Alpes-Côte d'Azur, France

Eygalières Aigalieras (Occitan)
- Commune
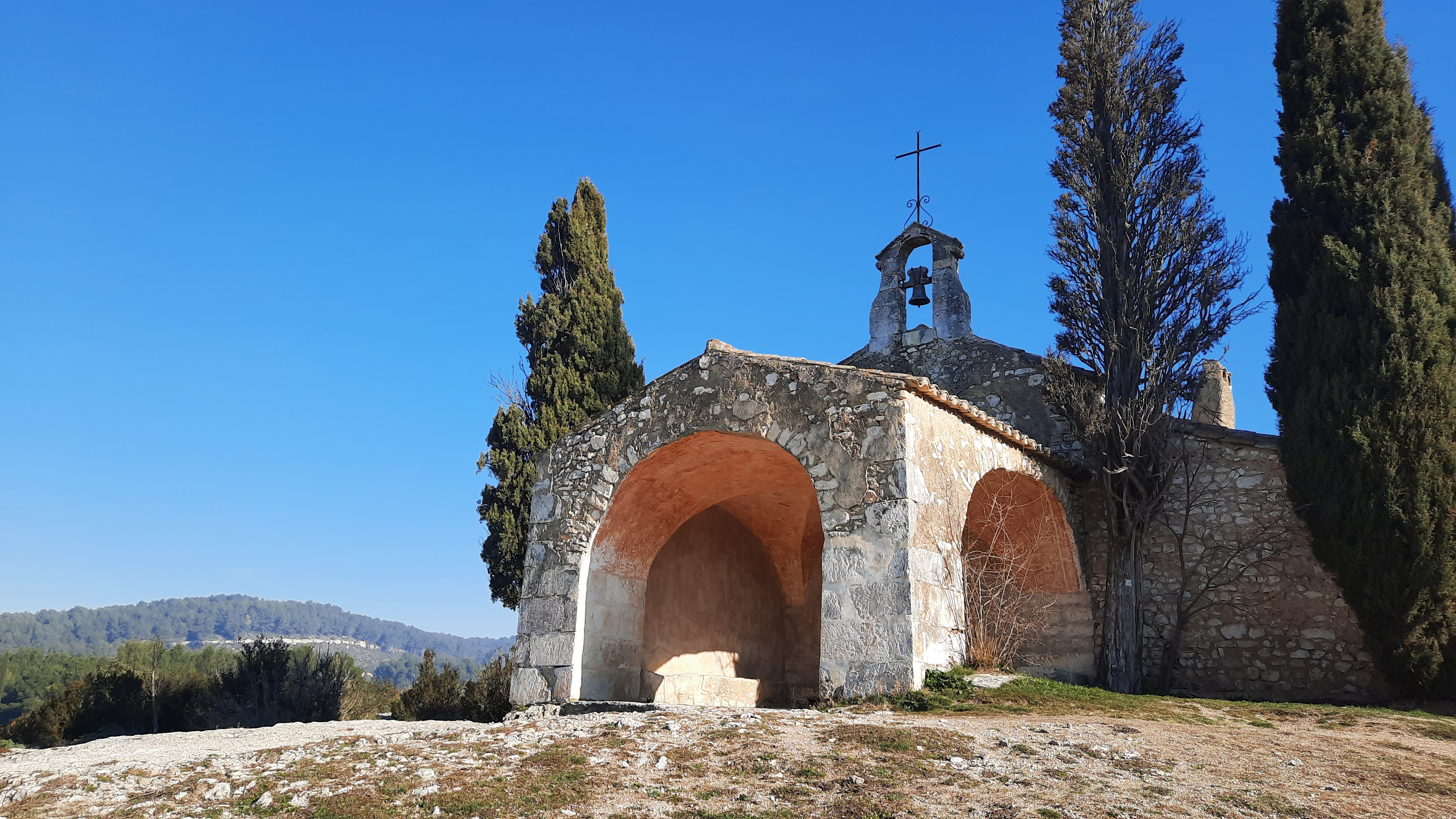
- The chapel of Saint-Sixte in Eygalières

- Coat of arms
- Location of Eygalières
- Location within France Location within Provence-Alpes-Côte d'Azur
- Coordinates: 43°45′39″N 4°57′00″E
- Country: France
- Region: Provence-Alpes-Côte d'Azur
- Department: Bouches-du-Rhône
- Arrondissement: Arles
- Canton: Salon-de-Provence-1
- Intercommunality: Vallée des Baux-Alpilles

Government
  - Mayor (2026–32): Aline Pelissier
- Area^{1}: 33.97 km^{2} (13.12 sq mi)
- Elevation: 20 m (66 ft)
- Highest elevation: 300 m (980 ft)
- Lowest elevation: 12 m (39 ft)
- Population (2023): 1,773
  - Density: 52.19/km^{2} (135.2/sq mi)
- Demonym: Eygaliérois
- Time zone: UTC+01:00 (CET)
  - Summer (DST): UTC+02:00 (CEST)
- INSEE/Postal code: 13034 /13810
- Website: www.mairieeygalieres.com
- ^{1} French Land Register data, which excludes lakes, ponds, glaciers > 1 km^{2} (0.386 sq mi or 247 acres) and river estuaries.

Eygalières (French pronunciation: [ɛɡaljɛʁ]; Provençal: Aigalieras (classical norm) or Eigaliero (mistralian norm)) is a commune in the Bouches-du-Rhône department in the Provence-Alpes-Côte d'Azur region, Southern France.

== Demographics ==
Historical population
Year	Pop.	±% p.a.
1968	1,233	—
1975	1,284	+0.58%
1982	1,427	+1.52%
1990	1,594	+1.39%
1999	1,851	+1.67%
2007	1,887	+0.24%
2012	1,761	−1.37%
2017	1,839	+0.87%
2023	1,773	−0.61%
Source: INSEE

== See also ==
- Alpilles
- Jardin de l'alchimiste
- Communes of the Bouches-du-Rhône department
