= Jardin d'Oiseaux Tropicaux =

Aviary and botanical garden in Provence-Alpes-Côte d'Azur, France

Coordinates: 43°08′17″N 6°14′04″E

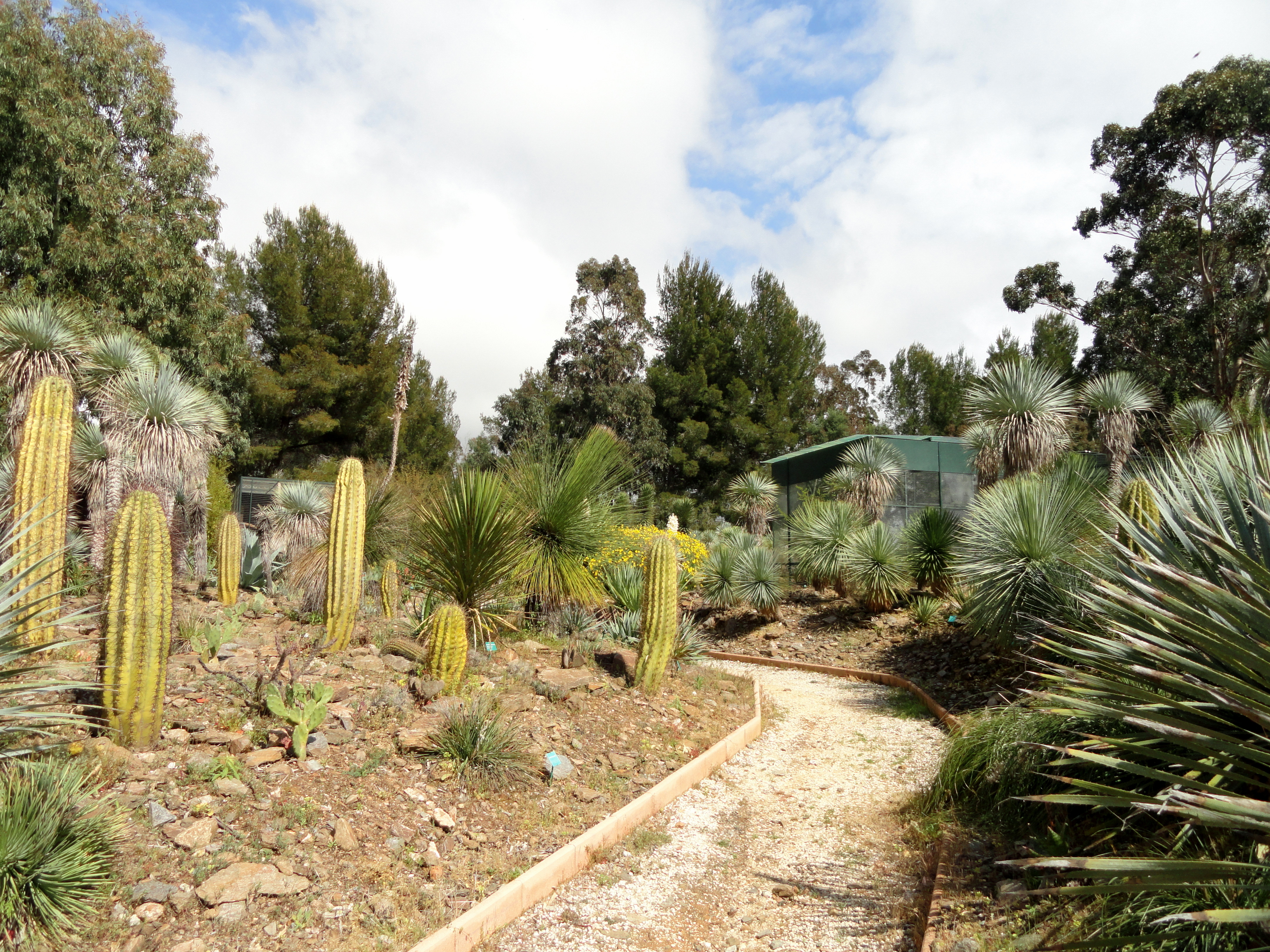
General view - Jardin d'oiseaux Tropicaux

The Jardin d'Oiseaux Tropicaux (5 hectares) is an aviary and botanical garden located on the Route de Valcros, La Londe-les-Maures, Var, Provence-Alpes-Côte d'Azur, France. It is open daily; an admission fee is charged.

The garden was established in 1989 and in 2008 was designated a Remarkable Garden of France by the French Ministry of Culture. It contains about 450 tropical birds representing 80 species from Asia, Africa, and South America, with notable collections of curassows, hornbills, kookaburras, parrots and parakeets, pigeons, and touracos. Its landscaped gardens contain national collections of agaves (more than 100 taxa) and yuccas (more than 40 taxa), as well as palm trees.

This garden is now called Jardin zoologique tropical.

== See also ==
- List of botanical gardens in France
