= Château de Sauvan =

Manor in Provence-Alpes-Côte d'Azur, France

Coordinates: 43°55′13″N 5°45′36″E

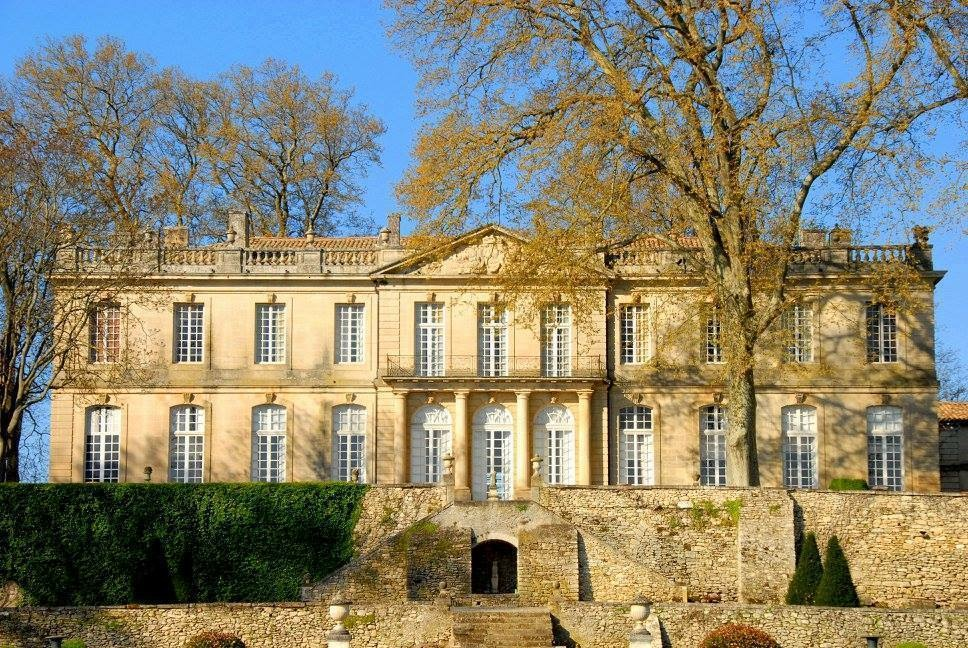
Castle of Sauvan, Provence, France

The Château de Sauvan is an 18th-century French manor located in the commune of Mane, near Forcalquier in the Department Alpes-de-Haute-Provence in France. The gardens of the chateau are classified as one of the Remarkable Gardens of France by the French Ministry of Culture.

Privately owned, and classified as a French historical monument since 1957, the Château de Sauvan is sometimes called "The Petit Trianon of Provence," because of its resemblance to that building.

== History ==
The château was built between 1719 and 1720 by Marquis Joseph Palamède de Forbin-Janson, on a plan of the architect Jean-Baptiste Franque from Avignon.

The château is in the form of classical one-story rectangle, with a balcony supported by four columns and a triangular pediment. The roof is hidden behind a balustrade. During the French Revolution the pediment was damaged by hammers, but otherwise the building suffered little damage.

During the French Revolution, the Comtesse and Princesse de Gallean Forbin-Janson, the owner of this Château, who resembled Queen Marie-Antoinette, is said to have offered to try to save the Queen by taking her place in the cells of the Conciergerie in Paris, where she was being held prisoner. She brought together a million francs, her entire fortune, to finance the project, but the Queen rejected the offer, sending her a note saying, "I cannot, and do not want to accept the sacrifice of your life. Adieu." When the plot was exposed, the Countess was forced to go abroad.
