= Rayol-Canadel-sur-Mer =

- Commune
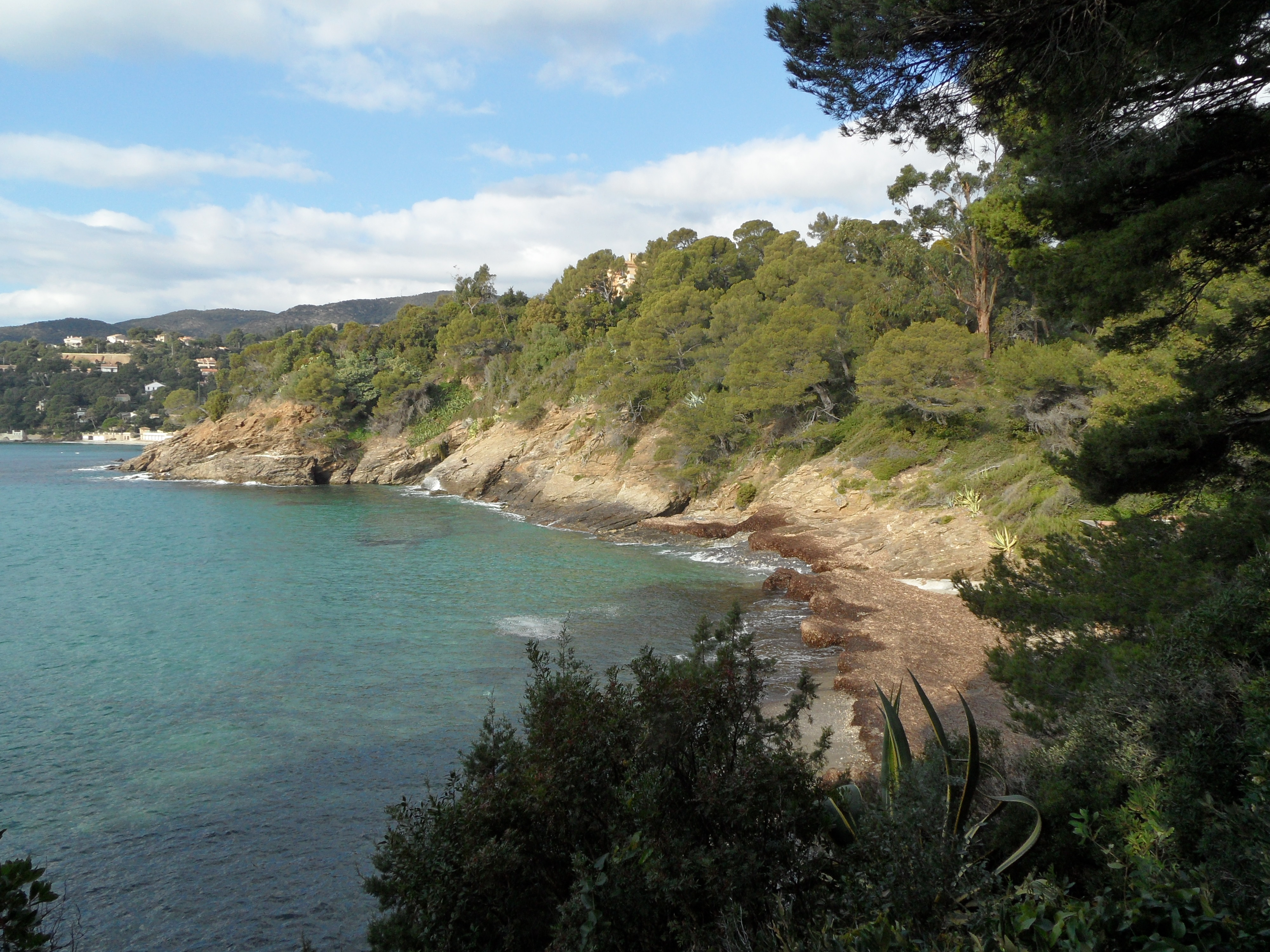
- A view from the coastal path of the Domaine Rayol

- Coat of arms
- Location of Rayol-Canadel-sur-Mer
- Location within France Location within Provence-Alpes-Côte d'Azur
- Coordinates: 43°09′34″N 6°27′45″E
- Country: France
- Region: Provence-Alpes-Côte d'Azur
- Department: Var
- Arrondissement: Draguignan
- Canton: La Crau

Government
  - Mayor (2020–2026): Jean Plenat
- Area^{1}: 6.83 km^{2} (2.64 sq mi)
- Elevation: 70 m (230 ft)
- Highest elevation: 494 m (1,621 ft)
- Lowest elevation: 0 m (0 ft)
- Population (2023): 639
  - Density: 93.6/km^{2} (242/sq mi)
- Time zone: UTC+01:00 (CET)
  - Summer (DST): UTC+02:00 (CEST)
- INSEE/Postal code: 83152 /83820
- ^{1} French Land Register data, which excludes lakes, ponds, glaciers > 1 km^{2} (0.386 sq mi or 247 acres) and river estuaries.

Rayol-Canadel-sur-Mer (French pronunciation: [ʁajɔl kanadɛl syʁ mɛʁ]; Occitan: Lo Raiòu Canadèu) is a commune in the Var department in the Provence-Alpes-Côte d'Azur region in southeastern France. It comprises two small villages: Le Rayol and Canadel. They are situated along the D559 which goes along the coast at an average distance of approximately 200 metres from the sea. Rayol-Canadel-Sur-Mer is in between Cavaliere and Cavalaire-sur-mer. There are villas above and below the road on the hillside facing the sea and there is a view of L'Île du Levant and L'Île de Port-Cros.

== Beaches ==
It has one beach at Canadel and another at Le Rayol. Carla Bruni, model, singer and wife of former French President Nicolas Sarkozy, visited the beach at Canadel before she became famous. For many years until 2007, there was a swimming race around the headland from one beach to the other but it was stopped after health and safety concerns. Every year there is a fireworks display on 15 August to celebrate when Allied troops landed on the beaches during World War II to liberate France in Operation Dragoon.

== Domaine du Rayol ==
The Domaine du Rayol is the most popular attraction in the village and contains gardens of plants from around the world.

David Coverdale and John Sykes of Whitesnake conceived their 1987 self-titled album,Whitesnake (album), in Le Rayol and it included Is This Love and Still Of The Night among other songs, making it the most successful record for the band.

== See also ==
- Communes of the Var department
