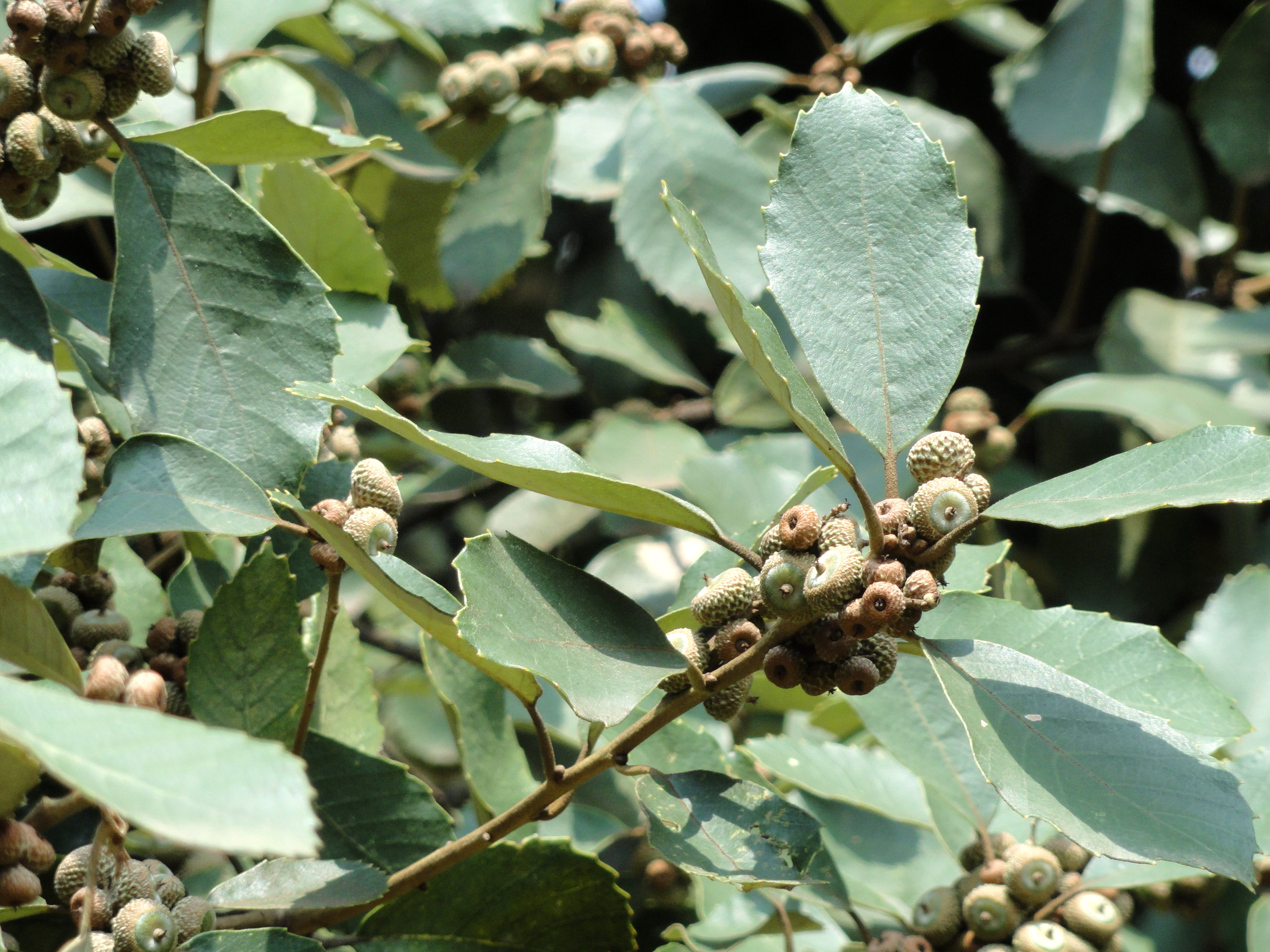

Conservation status
- Least Concern (IUCN 3.1)

Scientific classification
- Kingdom: Plantae
- Clade: Embryophytes
- Clade: Tracheophytes
- Clade: Spermatophytes
- Clade: Angiosperms
- Clade: Eudicots
- Clade: Rosids
- Order: Fagales
- Family: Fagaceae
- Genus: Quercus
- Subgenus: Quercus subg. Cerris
- Section: Quercus sect. Ilex
- Species: Q. franchetii

Binomial name
- Quercus franchetii Skan

Synonyms
- Quercus lanuginosa Franch.

= Quercus franchetii =

Zhui lian li evergreen oak

Species of oak tree

Quercus franchetii, commonly known as the zhui lian li evergreen oak, is a species of oak in the Ilex section of the genus, native to a wide area of eastern Asia. It is an oak native to south-central China (Sichuan and Yunnan), Myanmar, and northern Thailand, growing at elevations between 800 and 2,600 metres (2,600 and 8,500 feet).

== Description ==
In nature, it forms an evergreen tree up to 15 metres (49 feet) high. Sometimes it is shrubby. When older, it has irregular and tortuous branches. The branches are covered with a creamy white, long lasting tomentum. The buds are small, globular with pointed apex, reddish and white ciliated edge.

The leathery oval leaves measure 5 to 12 centimetres (2 to 4 1/2 inches) long by 2.5 to 6 cm (1 to 2 1/4 in) wide, and are evergreen (remaining on the plant over winter). They have a cuneate (wedge-shaped) or slightly rounded base, and the upper surface is smooth and shiny, while the underside is densely covered with yellowish fur. The leaf margin is dentate, with 5 to 10 pairs of short teeth, though not near the base, and the leaf sits on a 1–2-cm long furry gray-yellow petiole. The fruit is an acorn which measures 0.9–1.1 cm in length by 0.8 cm across; ovoid, apex depressed but mucronate; silky; short peduncle (1.5–3 cm); enclosed two-thirds by cup; cup 0.8–1.1 cm in diameter, scaly; maturing in 1 or 2 years.

== Taxonomy ==
This species was described in 1899 and dedicated to Adrien René Franchet, a botanist at the Muséum national d'histoire naturelle in Paris. Franchet had a few months earlier named and described this species as Q. lanuginosa, but his name turned out to have been used before, so Skan renamed it as Q. franchetii. It is in subgenus Cerris, section Ilex, resembling Q. lanata.
