= Gardens of the French Renaissance =

Garden

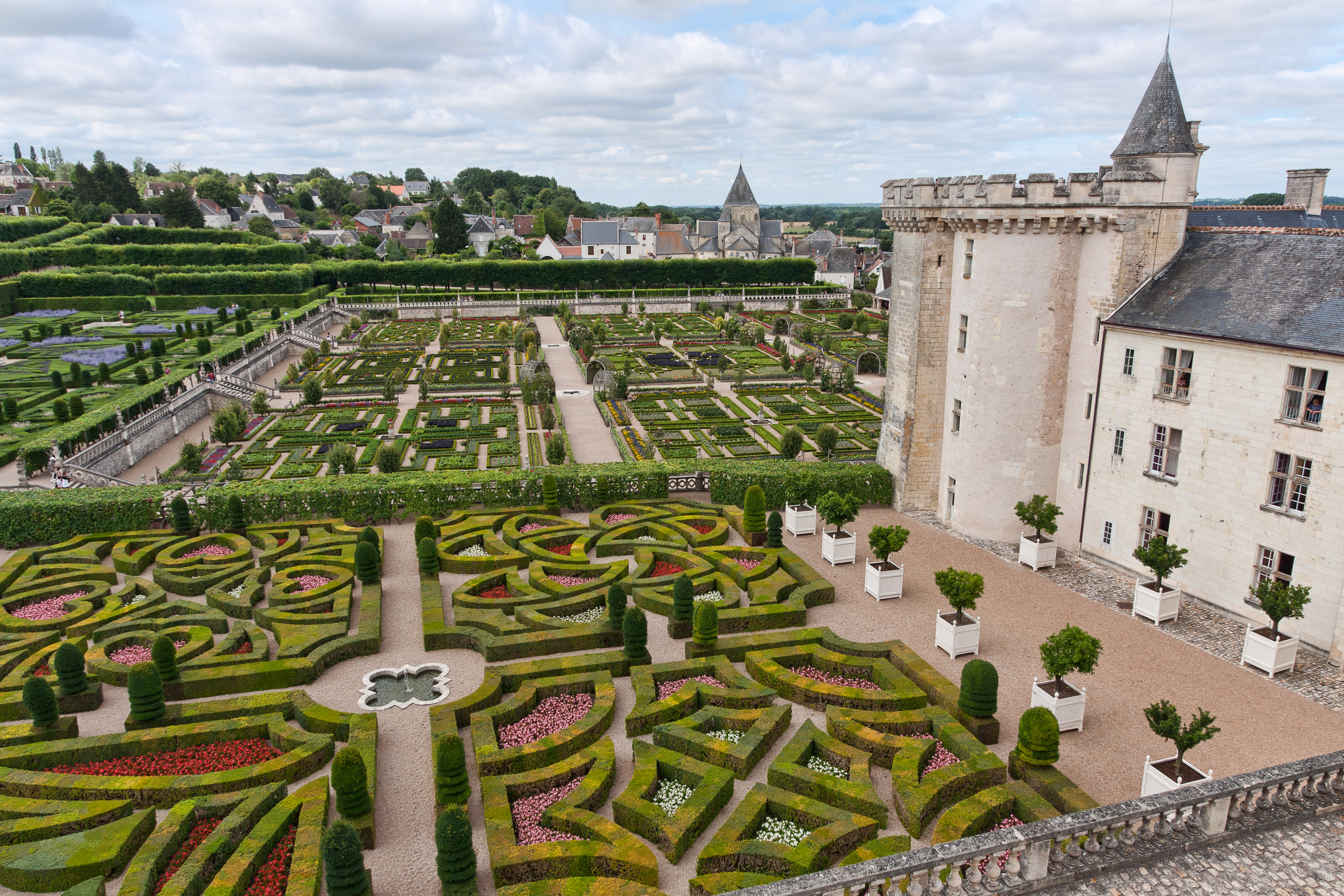
Gardens of the Château de Villandry

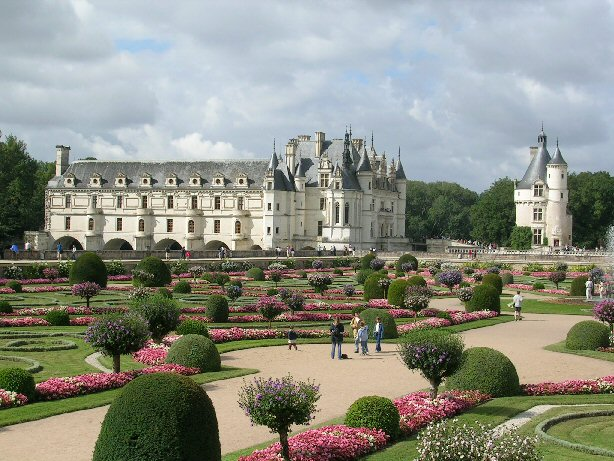
View of the Diane de Poitiers' garden at the Château de Chenonceau

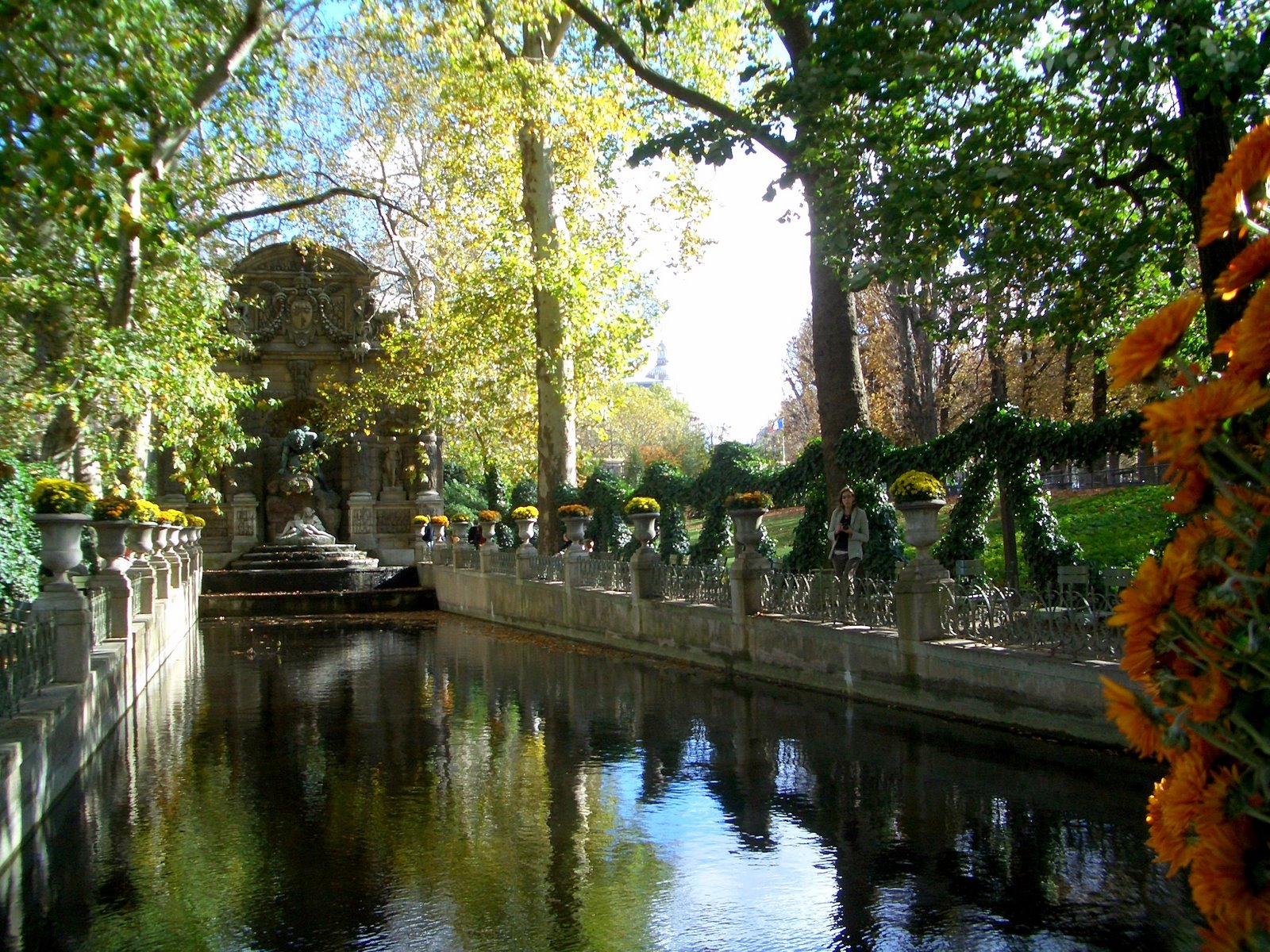
Medici Fountain in the Jardin du Luxembourg, Paris

Gardens of the French Renaissance were initially inspired by the Italian Renaissance garden, which evolved later into the grander and more formal jardin à la française during the reign of Louis XIV, by the middle of the 17th century.

In 1495, King Charles VIII and his nobles brought the Renaissance style back to France after their war campaign in Italy. They reached their peak in the gardens of the royal Château de Fontainebleau, Château d'Amboise, Château de Blois, and Château de Chenonceau.

French Renaissance gardens were characterized by symmetrical and geometric planting beds or parterres, plants in pots, paths of gravel and sand, terraces, stairways and ramps, moving water in the form of canals, cascades and monumental fountains, and extensive use of artificial grottoes, labyrinths, and statues of mythological figures. They became an extension of the châteaux that they surrounded, and were designed to illustrate the Renaissance ideals of measure and proportion, and to remind viewers of the virtues of Ancient Rome.

== History ==
=== Italian influence ===
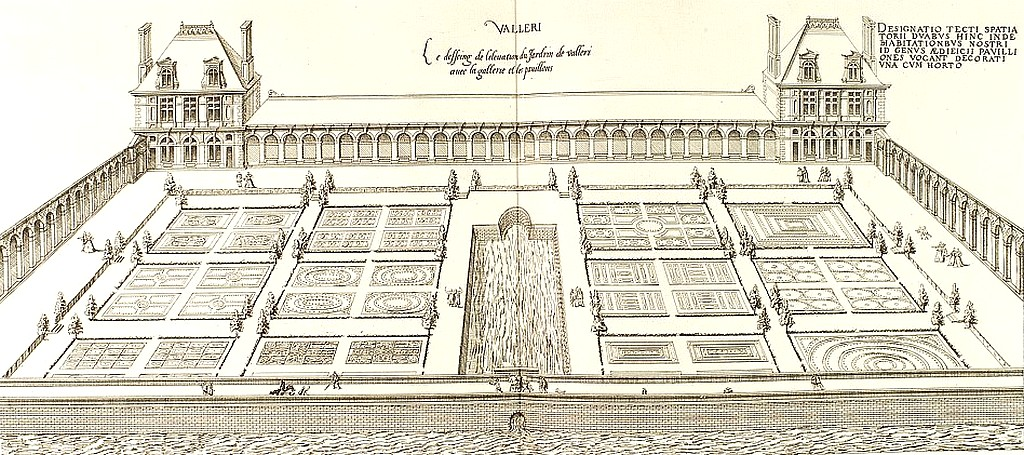
Château de Vallery, about 1570

In the 13th century, the Italian landscape architect Pietro de' Crescenzi wrote a treatise called Opus Ruralium Commdium, which laid out a formal plan for gardens, ornamented with topiary sculptures, trees and bushes trimmed into architectural shapes, following a tradition begun by the Romans. King Charles V of France ordered a French translation in 1373, and the new Italian style began to appear in France.

Another influential writer was Leon Battista Alberti (1404–1472), who in 1450 wrote a tract, De re aedificatoria for Lorenzo de' Medici. Alberti used the geometric principles of Vitruvius to design building façades and gardens. He suggested that the house should look over the garden, and that the garden should have "porticos for giving shade, cradles where vines grow on columns of marble, and there should be vases and even amusing statues, provided that they are not obscene."

In his design of the gardens of the Cortile del Belvedere in Rome, the architect Bramante (1444–1544) introduced the idea of perspective, using a long axis perpendicular to the palace, along which he placed parterres and fountains. This became a central feature of Renaissance gardens.

A popular novel by the monk Francesco Colonna, published in Venice in 1499, called The Dream of Poliphile, an allegorical journey by a traveller, Poliphile, to fantastic lands in search of his love, Polia, had an enormous influence upon gardens of the time. The ideas of a "garden-island" in a lake, such as the one in the Boboli Gardens in Florence, of statues of giants coming out of earth in the park of the Villa di Pratolino, and the theme of labyrinth were all taken from the imaginary voyages of Poliphile. All these elements were to appear in French Renaissance gardens.

=== Birthplace of Renaissance gardens in France: Château-Gaillard (Amboise) ===
In 1495, Charles VIII invaded the Kingdom of Naples, and he saw the luxury of the palaces and gardens in Italy. When he returned to France in 1496, he convinced and brought back with him 22 Italian artists, including a monk and master gardener from Naples named Pacello da Mercogliano. They decided to reproduce in Amboise the marvels of Tuscany and elected a 15 hectares amphitheater-shaped land in the heart of the city to realize the King's dream of Poggioreale. Charles VIII ordered the construction of Château-Gaillard, Amboise, and Pacello chose this royal domain to introduce and acclimatize the first orange trees in France. He created lawns, floral beds and settings for his "Arte del Verde" and successfully introduced Italian style gardens for the very first time in France. He used Château-Gaillard as an experimental laboratory for his innovations: he created a new variety of plum called "Reine Claude" ("Queen Claude"), and used very specific techniques such as half barrels as tree planter boxes.

The gardens of Château-Gaillard stand as the "missing link" between medieval monastic gardens and future French formal gardens.

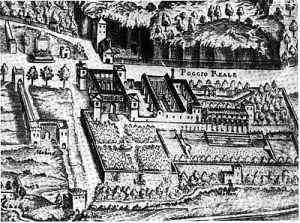
Villa Poggio Reale

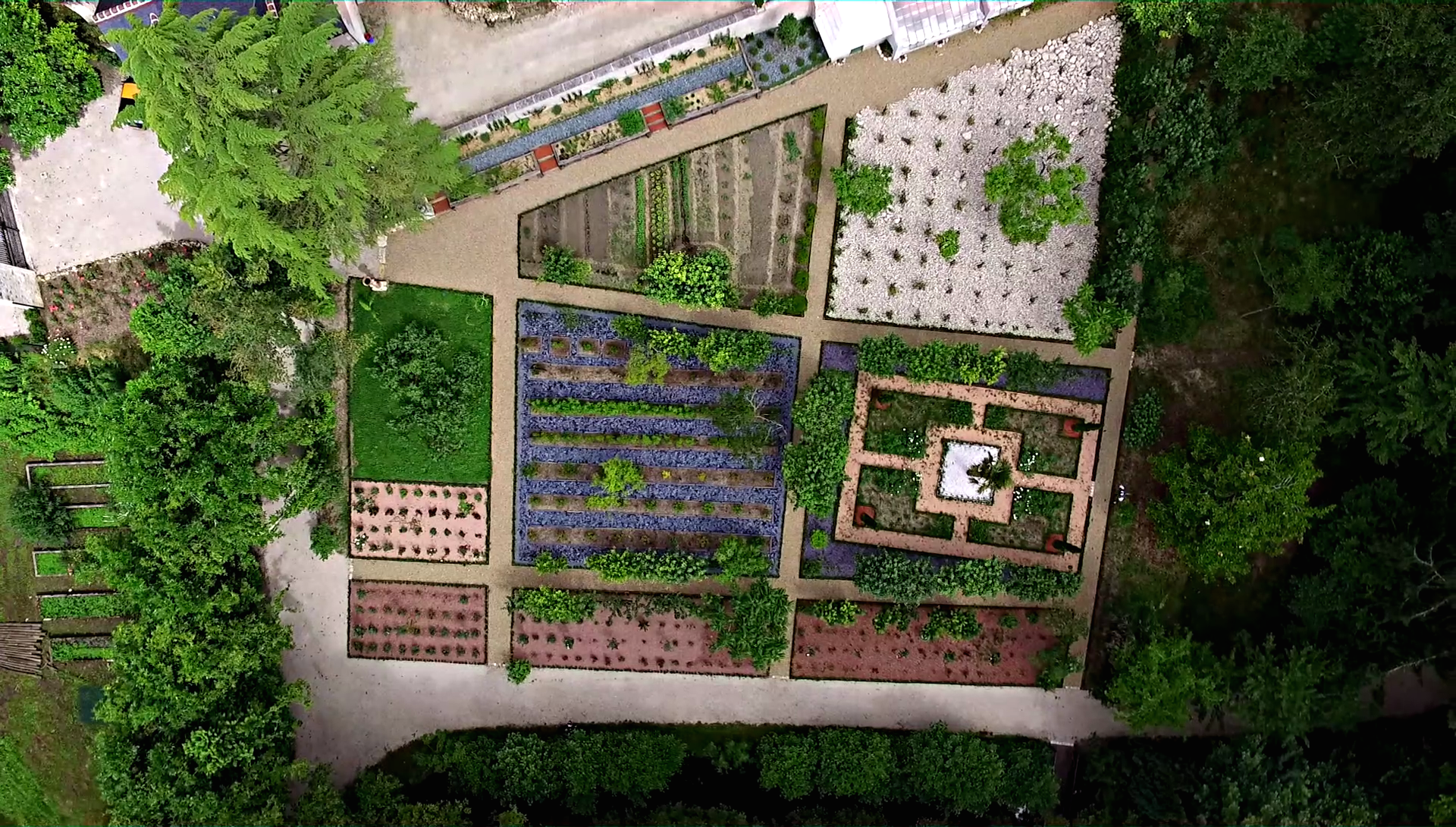
Pacellian parquets

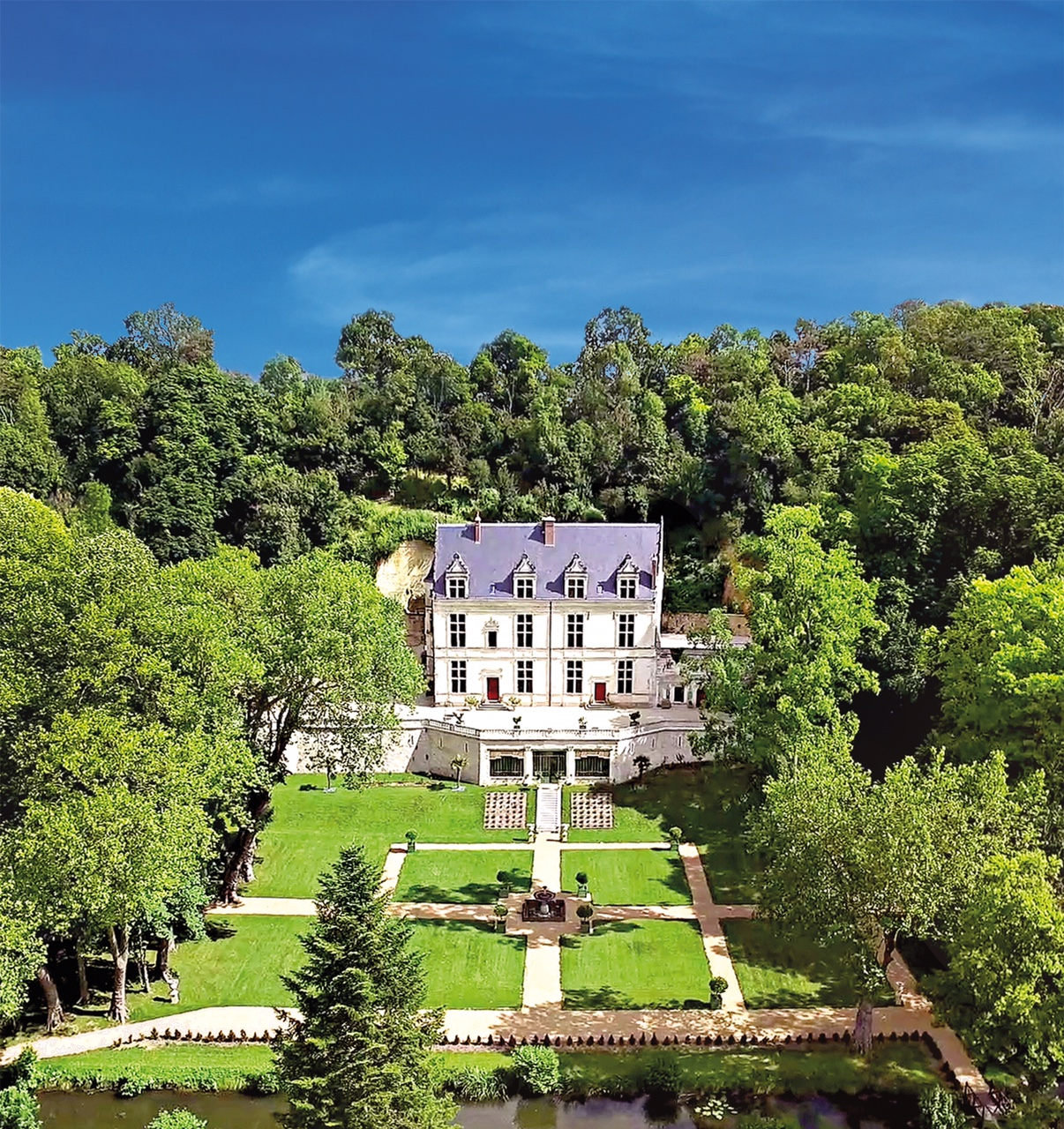
Royal Domain of Château-Gaillard, Amboise

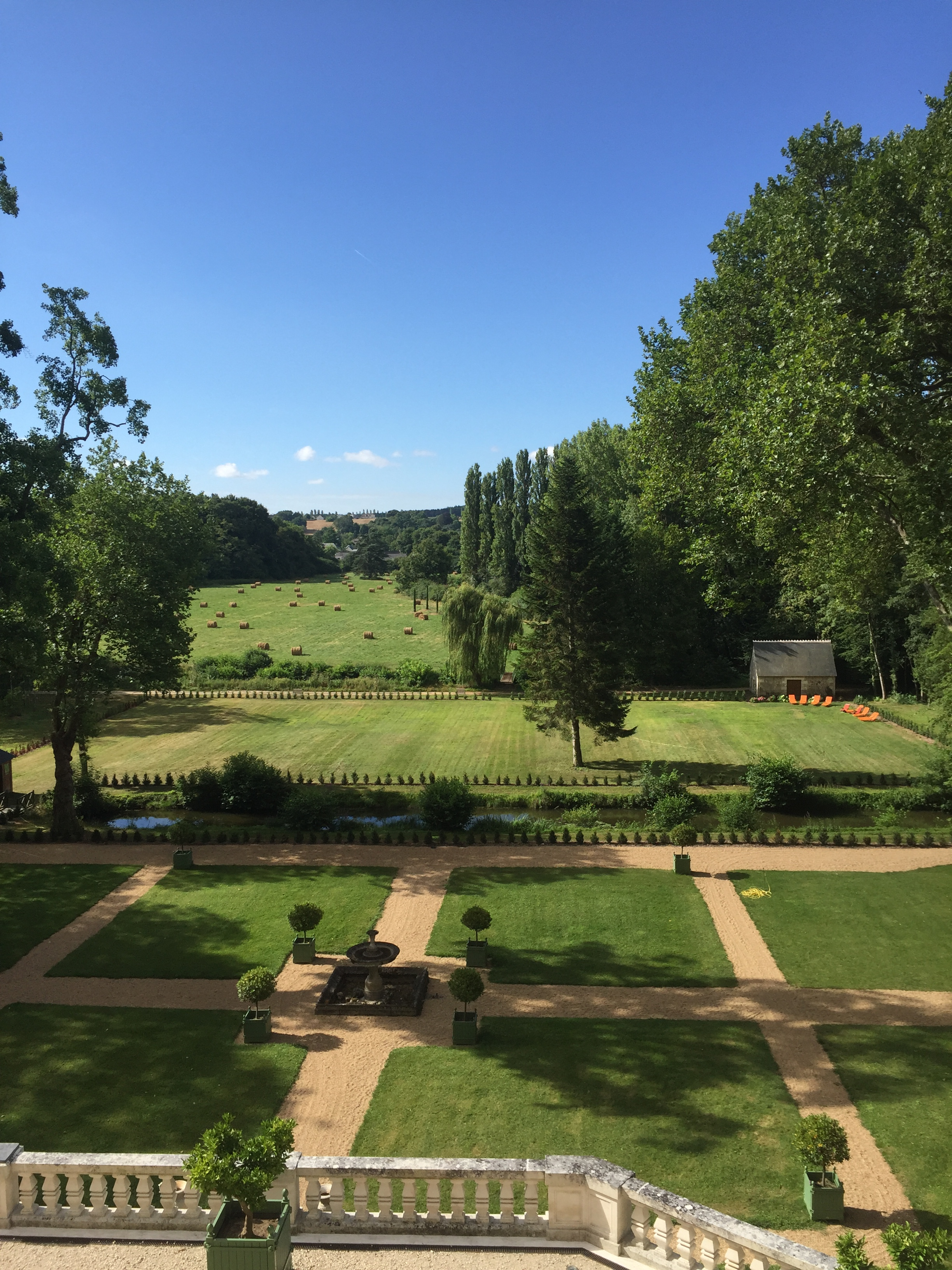
View of the Grand Parterres

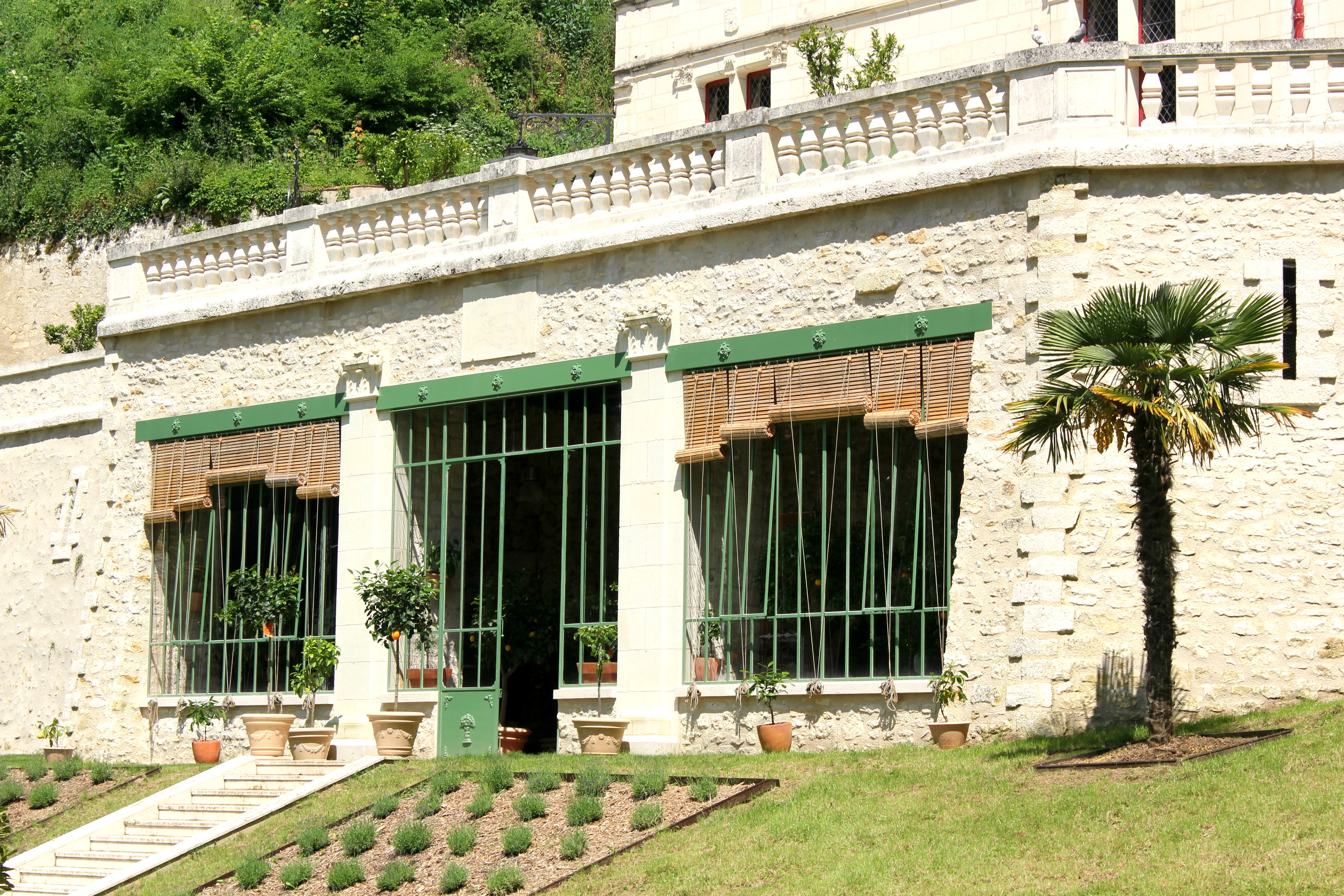
Royal orangery Château-Gaillard

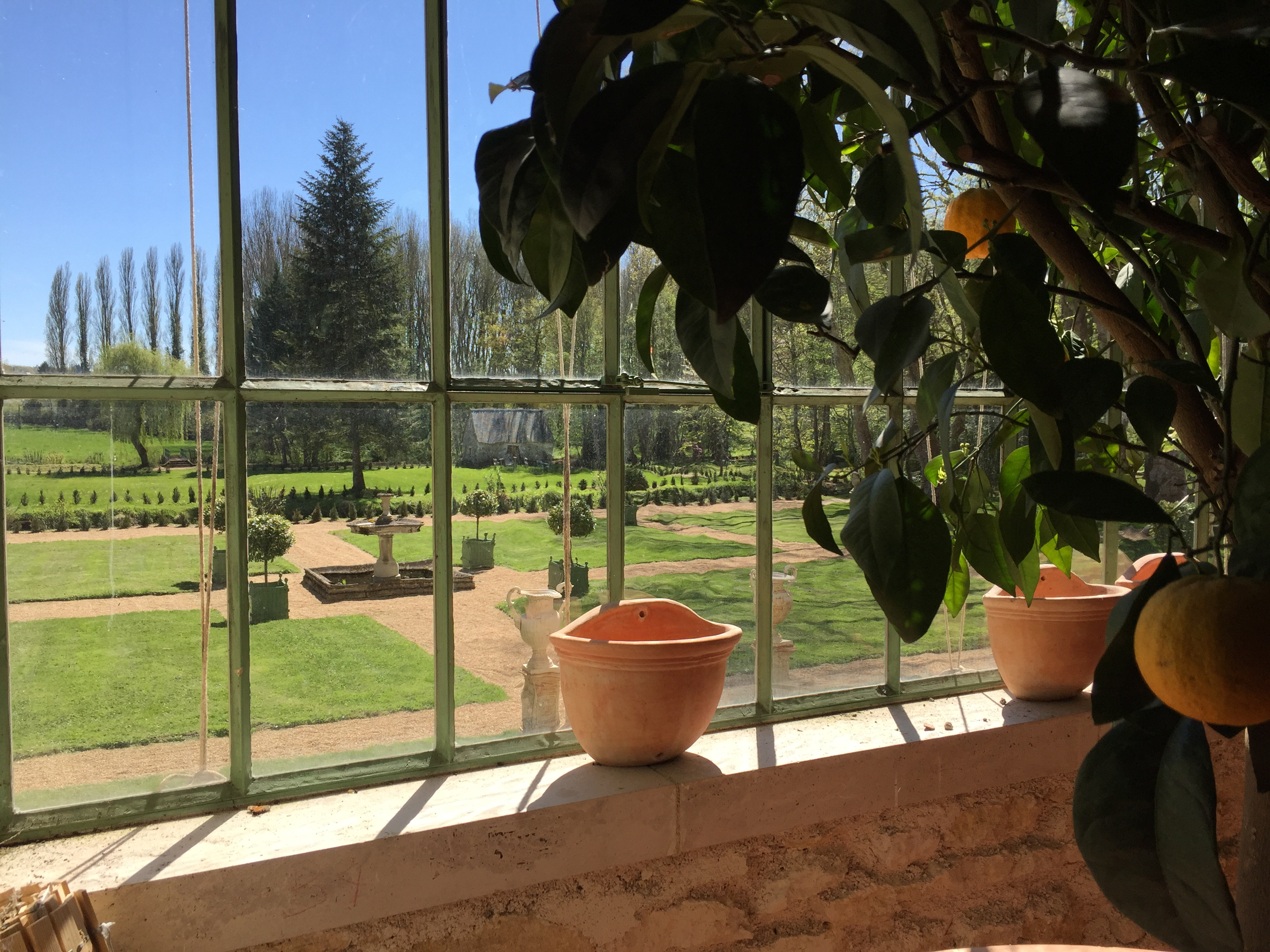
Orangery

=== Gardens of the Château d'Amboise, Blois, Gaillon and Bury ===
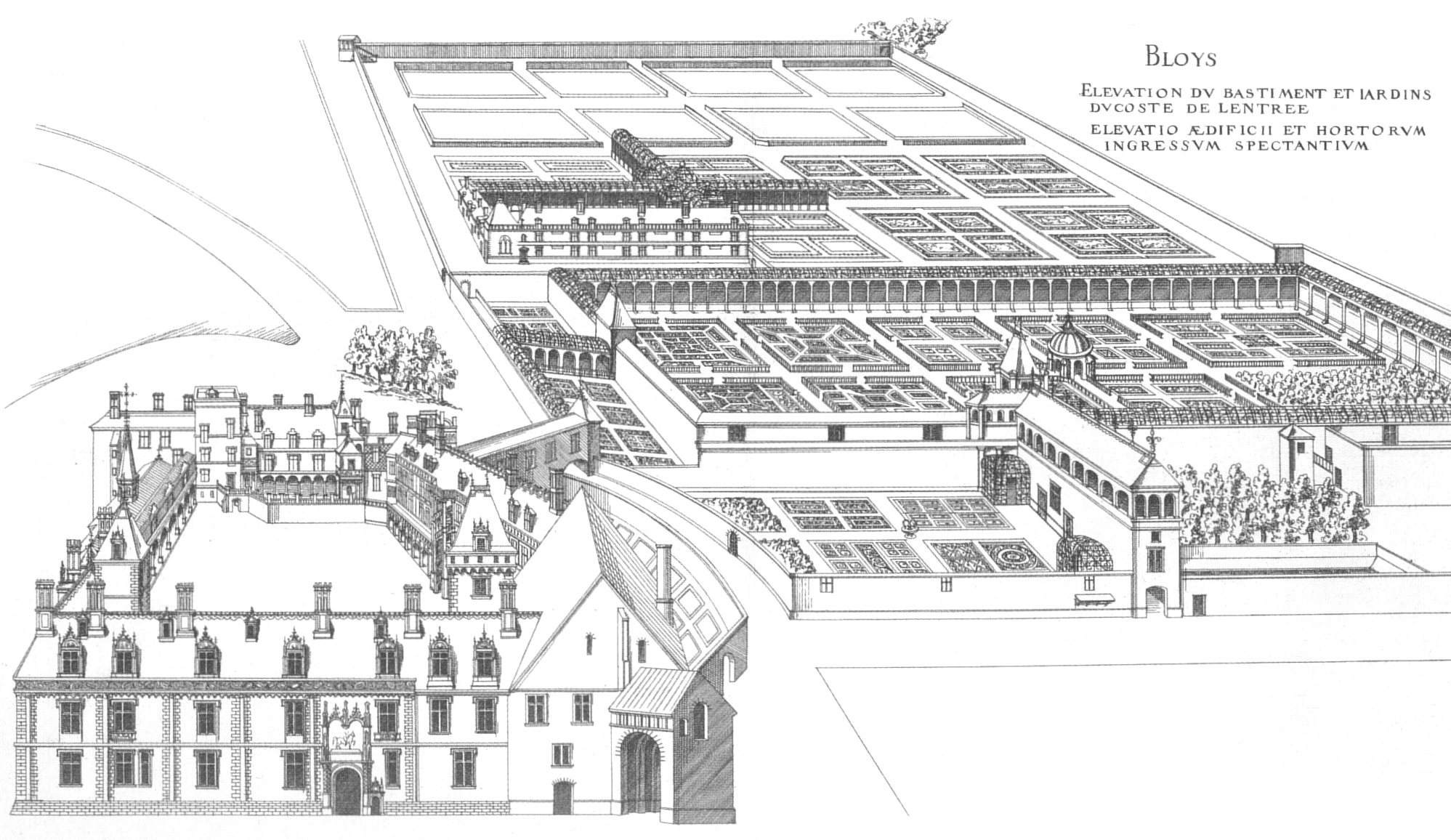
Gardens of the Château de Blois, about 1570

At the beginning of the 16th century, King Francis I, who had also visited Italy and had met Leonardo da Vinci, built gardens in the new style on three terraces of different levels bordered by the old walls of his Château de Blois. Besides the parterres of flowers, the gardens produced a wide variety of vegetables and fruits, including orange and lemon trees in boxes, which were taken indoors in winter. The building that sheltered them, still standing, was the first orangerie in France. The gardens were on the site of the present-day Grow Garden] and the site of the railways station. The last vestiges of the garden were destroyed in 1890 by the construction of the Avenue Victor-Hugo.

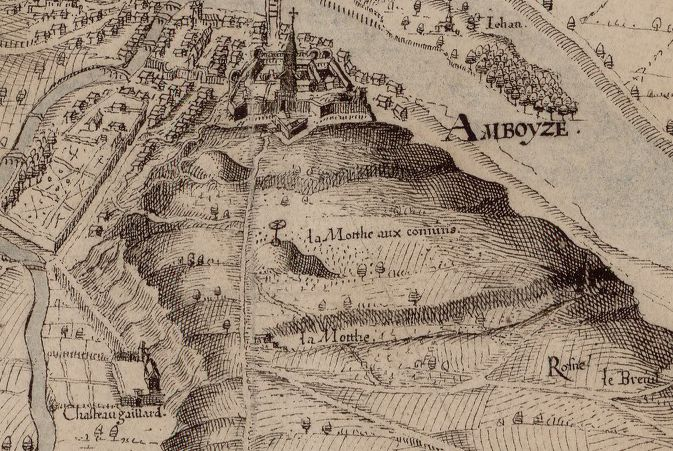
Map of Amboise in 1600

At about the same time, Pacello da Mercogliano designed gardens for the Château de Gaillon owned by Cardinal Georges d'Amboise, a Minister of King Henry IV, who had also spent time in Italy. The gardens, built on different levels below the old medieval château, were planted in parterres of flowers and fruit trees. The parterre at the entrance of the garden featured the coat of arms of France in flowers. Bushes were trimmed into the shapes of men on horseback, ships, and birds. It was also decorated with imposing fountains of marble.

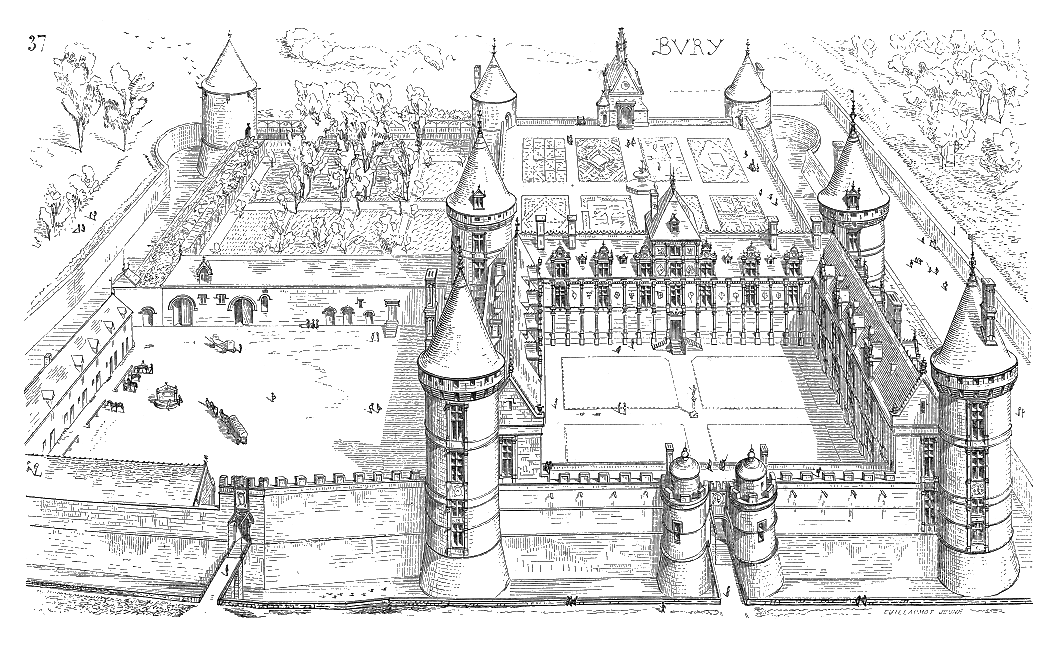
Château of Bury

The gardens of the Château de Bury were built between 1511 and 1524 by Florimont Robertet, a Secretary of State for both Louis XII and Francis I. Robertet had visited the Villa Medici in Fiesole and wanted to reproduce the terraced gardens he saw there. The château, departing from the traditional design, was integrated closely with its gardens. Visitors passed through a square garden inside the castle and out into two geometric gardens behind the château, decorated with fountains and surrounded by a wooden gallery. The axis went from the entrance to the chapel, at the far end of the garden. Like Italian Renaissance gardens, the gardens of Bury were located on the edge of a hill, with a fine view of the forest of Blois. In the centre of the court of the château, Robertet placed a bronze copy of Michelangelo's David, which had been given to him by the Republic of Florence.

=== Gardens of Fontainebleau ===
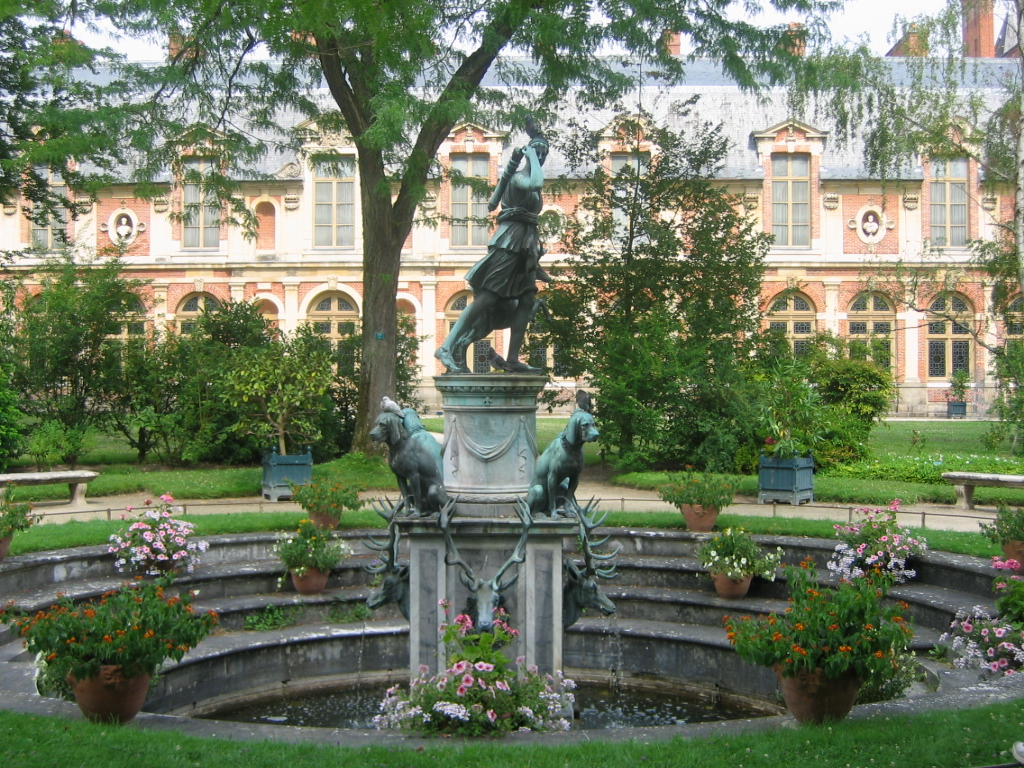
Fountain of Diana, in the gardens of the Château de Fontainebleau

The gardens of the Château de Fontainebleau, located in a forest which had been the hunting preserve of the Capetian Kings of France, were created by Francis I beginning in 1528. The garden featured fountains, parterres, a forest of pine trees brought from Provence and the first artificial grotto in France in 1541. Catherine de' Medici ordered copies in bronze of the statues which decorated the Cortile del Belvedere in Rome. A statue of Hercules in repose by Michelangelo decorated the garden of the lake. In 1594, Henry IV added a small island in the lake connected to the court of fountains by a bridge.

=== Gardens of Chenonceau ===
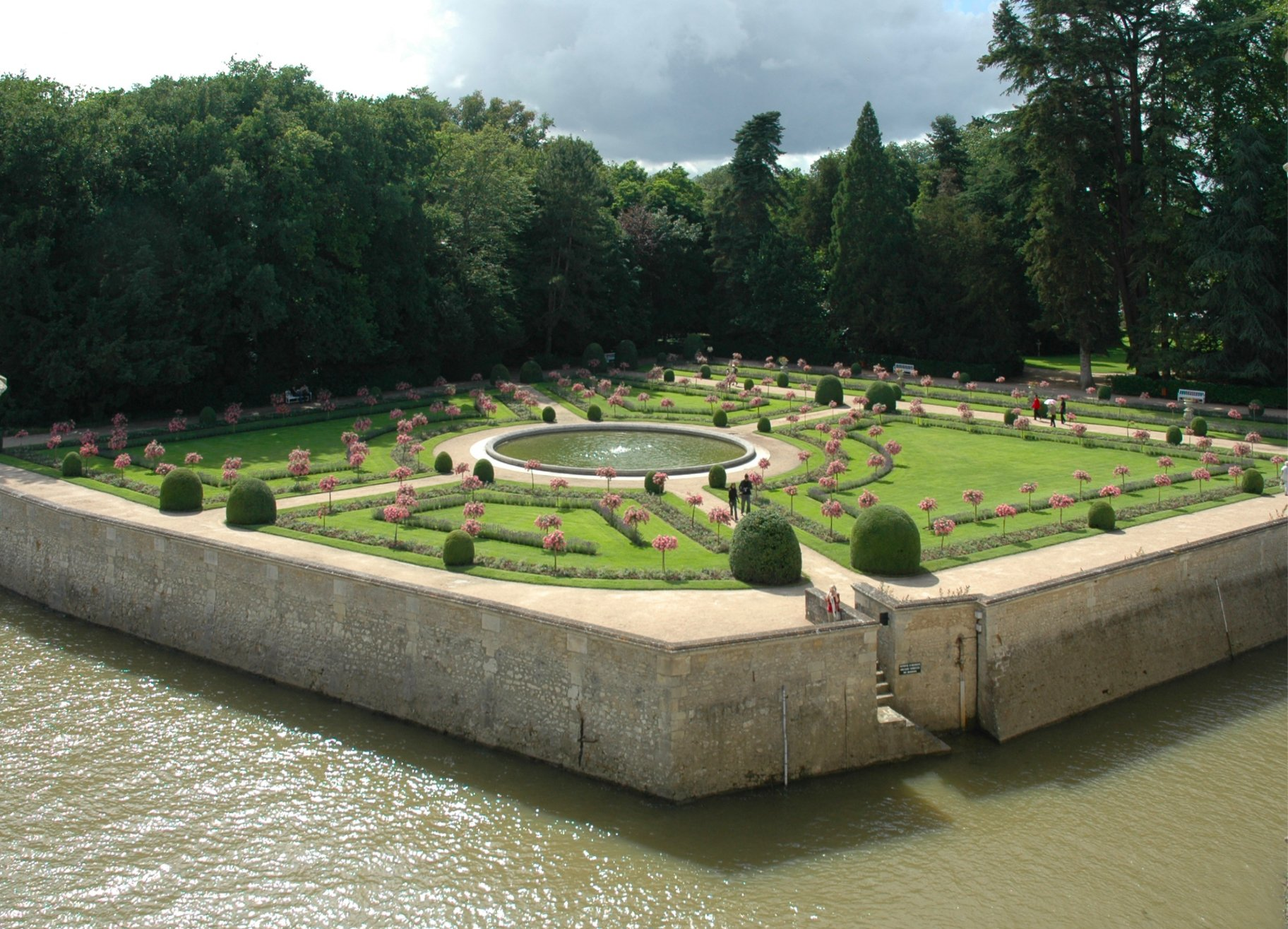
View of the Catherine de' Medici's garden at Château de Chenonceau

The Château de Chenonceau had two separate gardens: the first created in 1551 for Diane de Poitiers, the mistress of King Henry II, with a large parterre and a jet d'eau (jet of water), and a second, smaller garden created for Catherine de' Medici in 1560, on a terrace raised above the River Cher, divided into compartments, with a basin in the centre.

=== Gardens of Saint-Germaine-en-Laye ===
The gardens of the Château de Saint-Germain-en-Laye marked the beginning of the transition to a new style, which would be called jardin à la française. The garden was laid out in 1595 by royal gardener Charles Mollet for Henry IV.

== Chronology ==
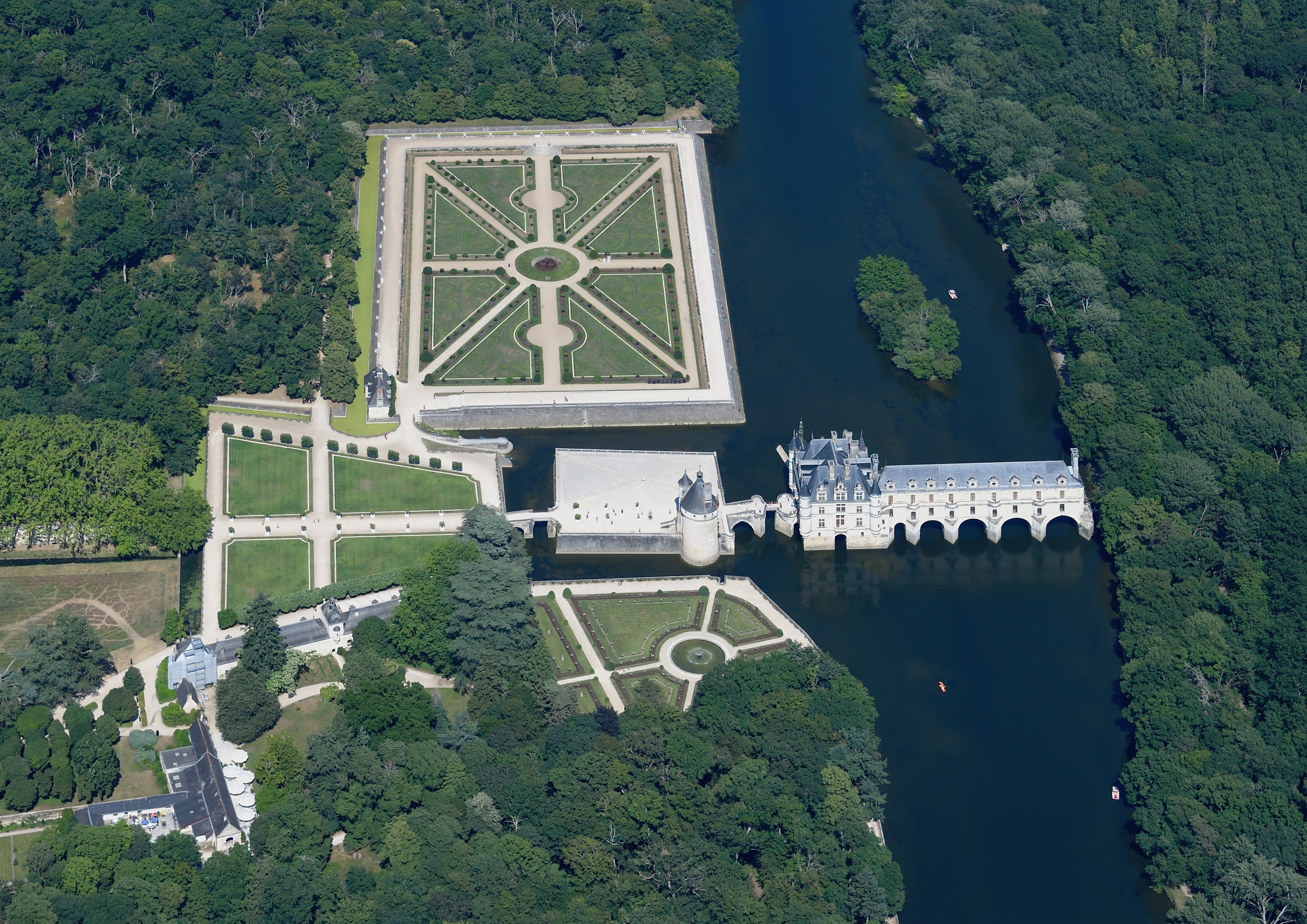
Aerial view of Château de Chenonceau and its gardens

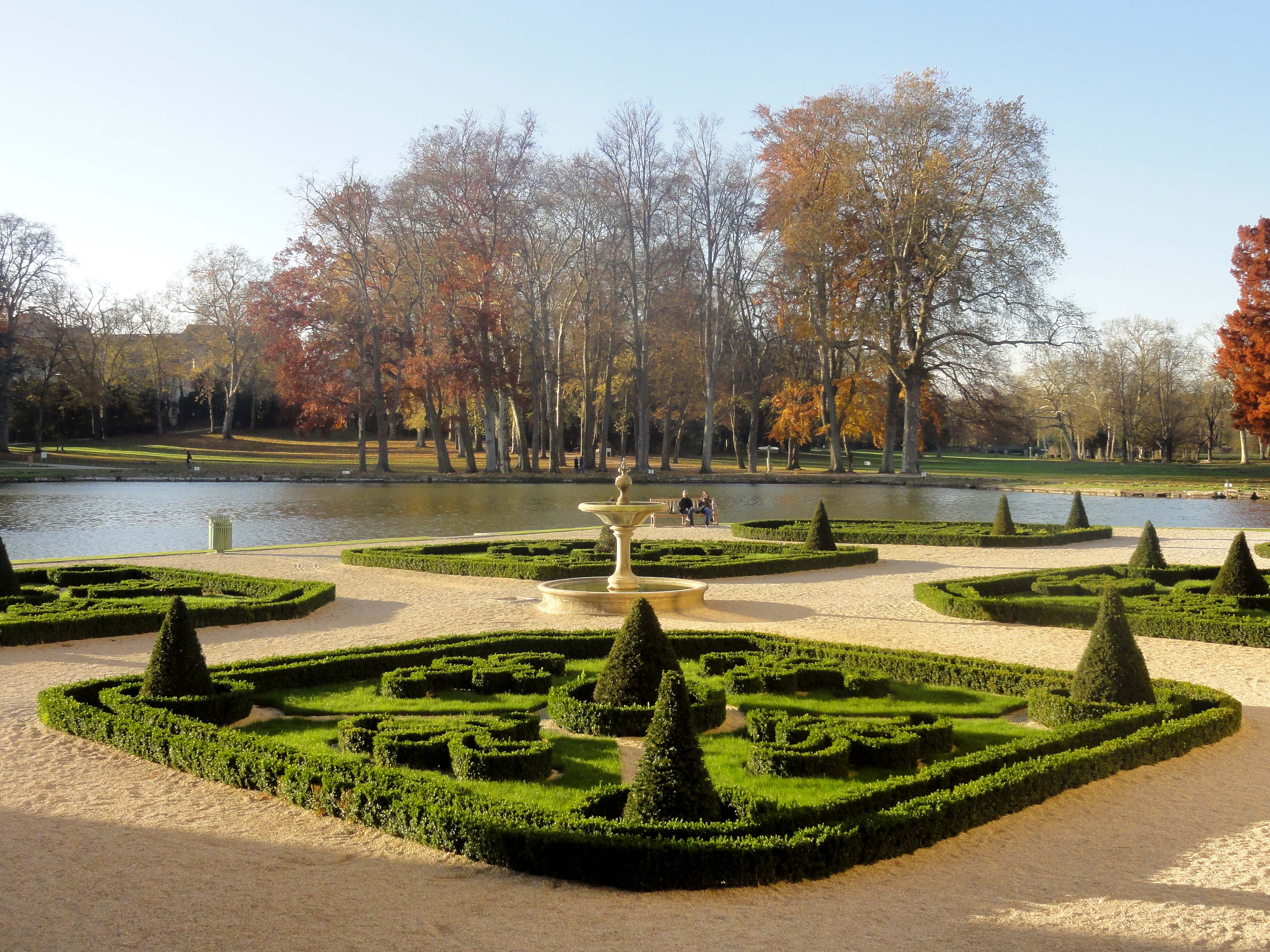
Jardin de la volière at Château de Chantilly

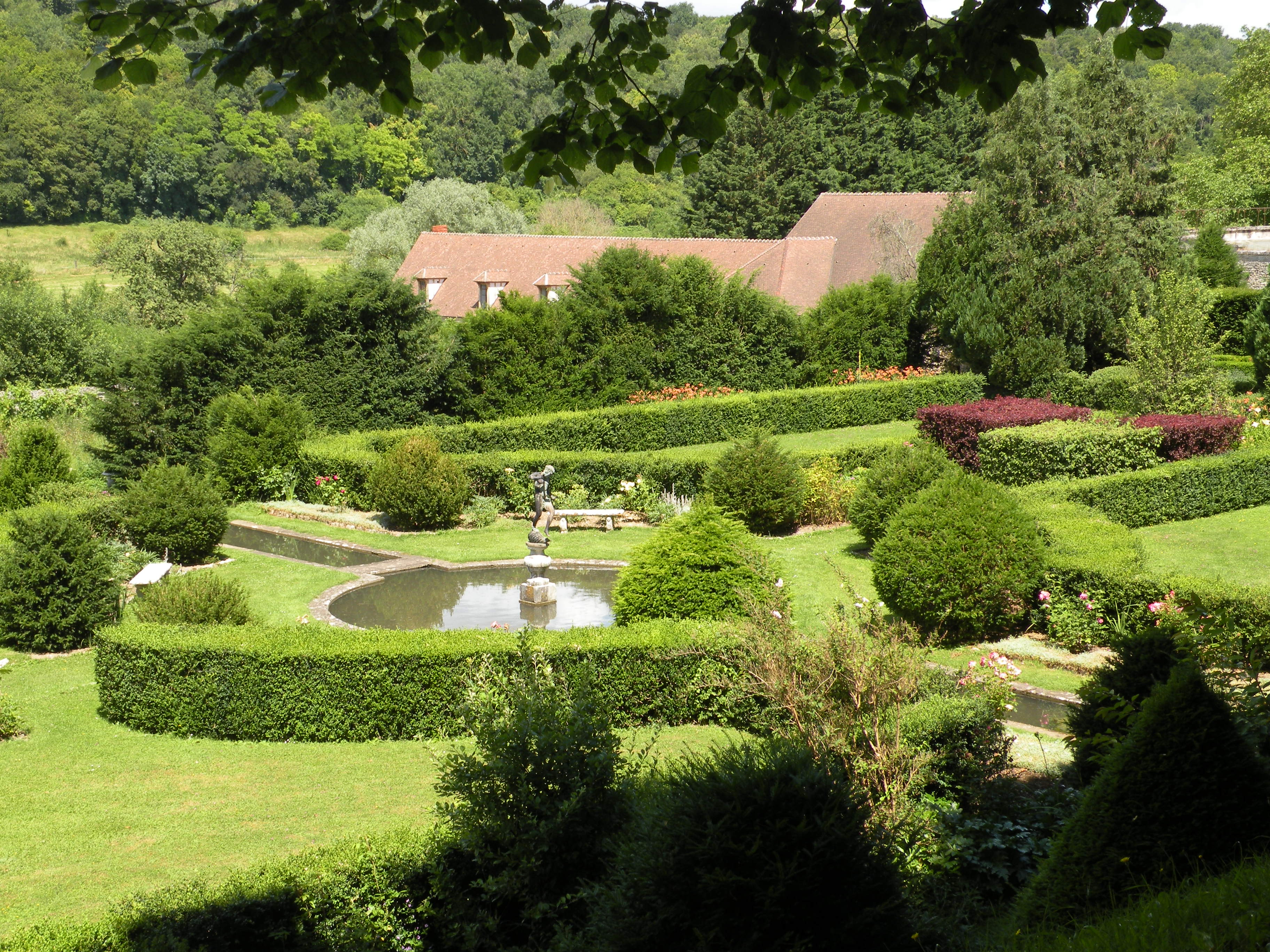
Garden of the Château d'Ambleville

- Château d'Amboise (1495)
- Château de Blois (1499) (gardens were destroyed in the 19th century.)
- Château de Gaillon (1502–1550)
- Château de Bury-en-Blesois (1511–1520)
- Château de Chenonceau, (1515–1589) gardens of Diane de Poitiers (1551) and Catherine de' Medici (1560)
- Château de Chantilly (1524)
- Château de Fontainebleau (1528–1447)
- Château de Saint-Maur (1536)
- Château d'Anet (1536)
- Château de Saint-Germain-en-Laye (1539–1547) – old Château and gardens
- Château de Villandry (1536)
- Montceaux-les-Maux (1549–1560)
- Château de Vallery (1550)
- La Bastie d'Urfe (1551)
- Château de Dampierre-sur-Boutonne (1552–1600)
- Château de Saint-Germain-en-Laye (1539–1547) – new Château and terraces
- Château de Charleval (1560)
- Tuileries Palace and Gardens (1564–1593)
- Château de Verneuil (1565)
- Château d'Anet (1582) New Gardens.
- Château de Fontainebleau (1594–1609) New gardens by Claude Mollet
- Tuileries Garden in Paris (1599) by Claude Mollet, Delorme, Duperac
- Luxembourg Garden in Paris (1612–1630)

=== Modern versions ===
- Garden of the Château d'Ambleville

== Bibliography ==
- Yves-Marie Allain and Janine Christiany, L'art des jardins en Europe, Citadelles et Mazenod, Paris, 2006
- Claude Wenzler, Architecture du jardin, Editions Ouest-France, 2003
- Lucia Impelluso, Jardins, potagers et labyrinthes, Hazan, Paris, 2007.
- Philippe Prevot, Histoire des jardins, Editions Sud Ouest, 2006
