= Château d'Ambleville =

French Renaissance style château

Coordinates: 49°9′2″N 1°41′47″E

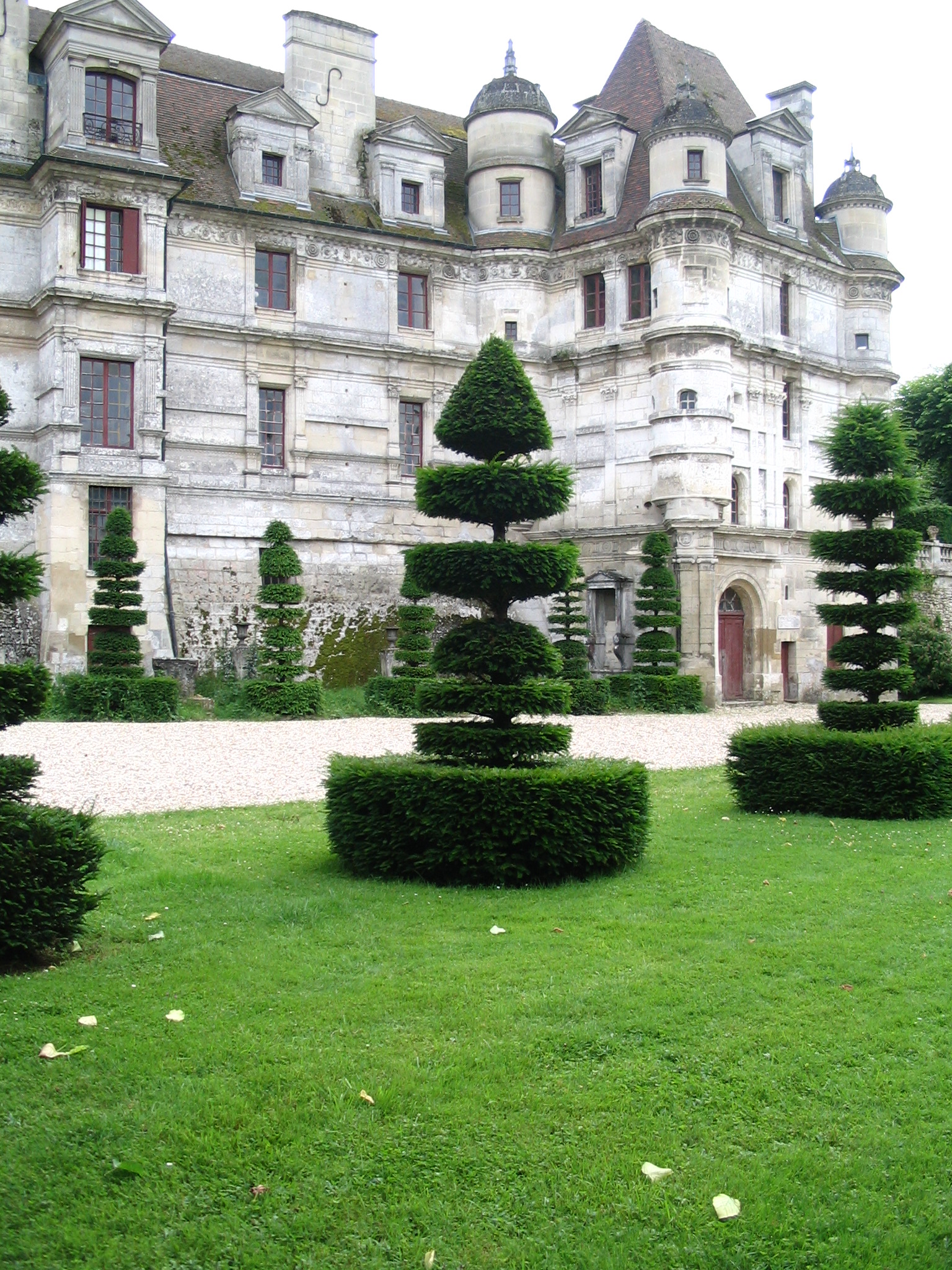
The north facade of the Château d'Ambleville. The topiary sculpture of the trees imitates the architecture of the towers of the château.

The Château d'Ambleville is a French Renaissance style château located within the regional park of Vexin, in the Val d'Oise Department of France. The chateau is classified as a monument historique of France.

The gardens are classified among the Notable Gardens of France by the Ministry of Culture of France.

== History ==
The château was built in the 16th century for the seigneurs of Ambleville and Villarceaux by architect Jean Grappin, on the foundations of a medieval castle on the banks of the Aubette. In the 17th century, the house was acquired by the Duke of Villeroy, Nicolas V, the Ambassador of France to Medicis. He created a garden in the Florentine style. The house was purchased in 1893 by Charles Sedelmeyer (1837–1925), who restored the chateau and added a theater and Venetian chimneys and balconies. In 1928 the new owner, the Marquise de Villefranche, remade the gardens after those of the recently restored gardens of the Villa Gamberaia in Florence. Today they offer one of the best examples of an Italian Renaissance garden in France.

== Gallery ==
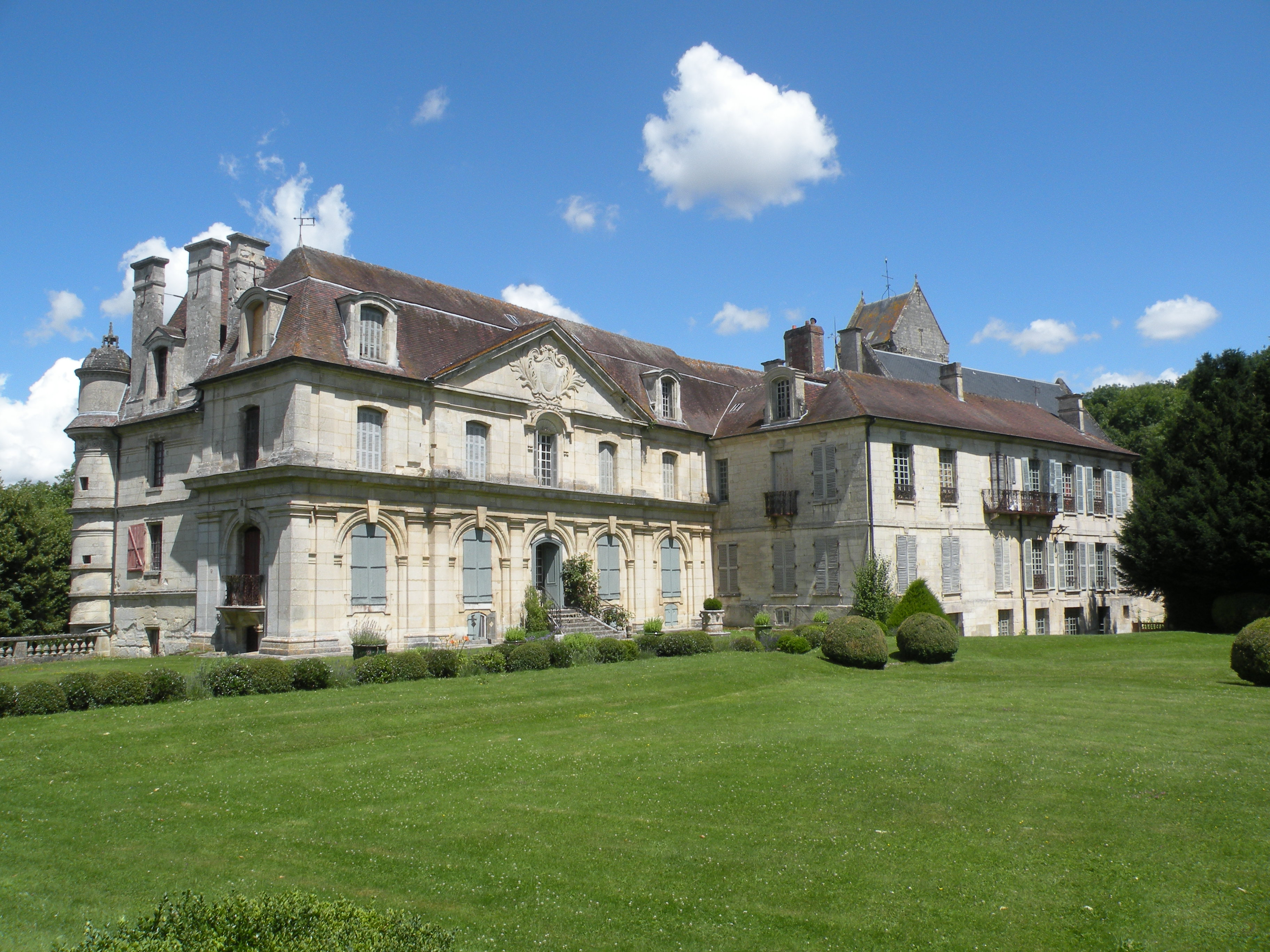

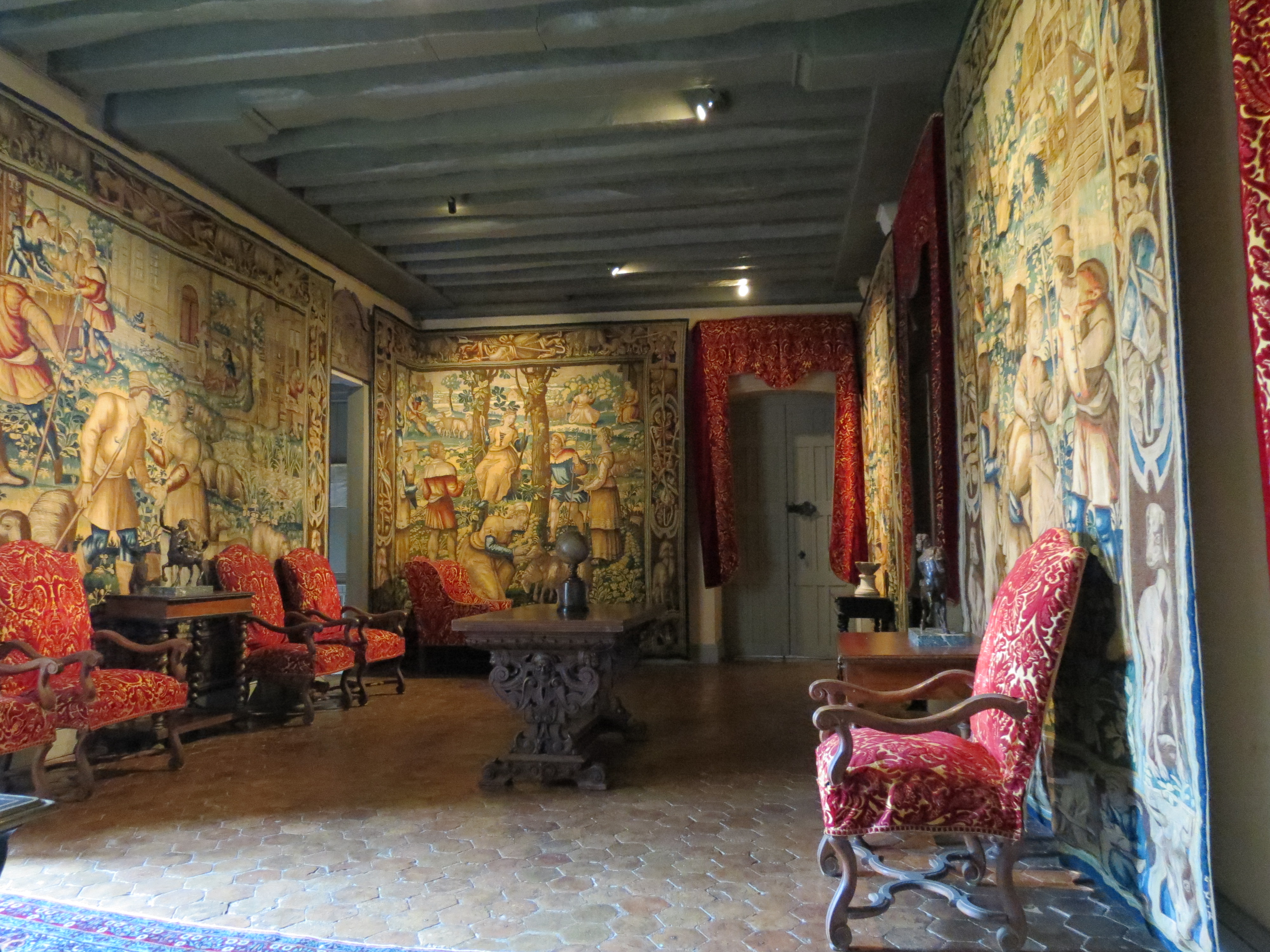

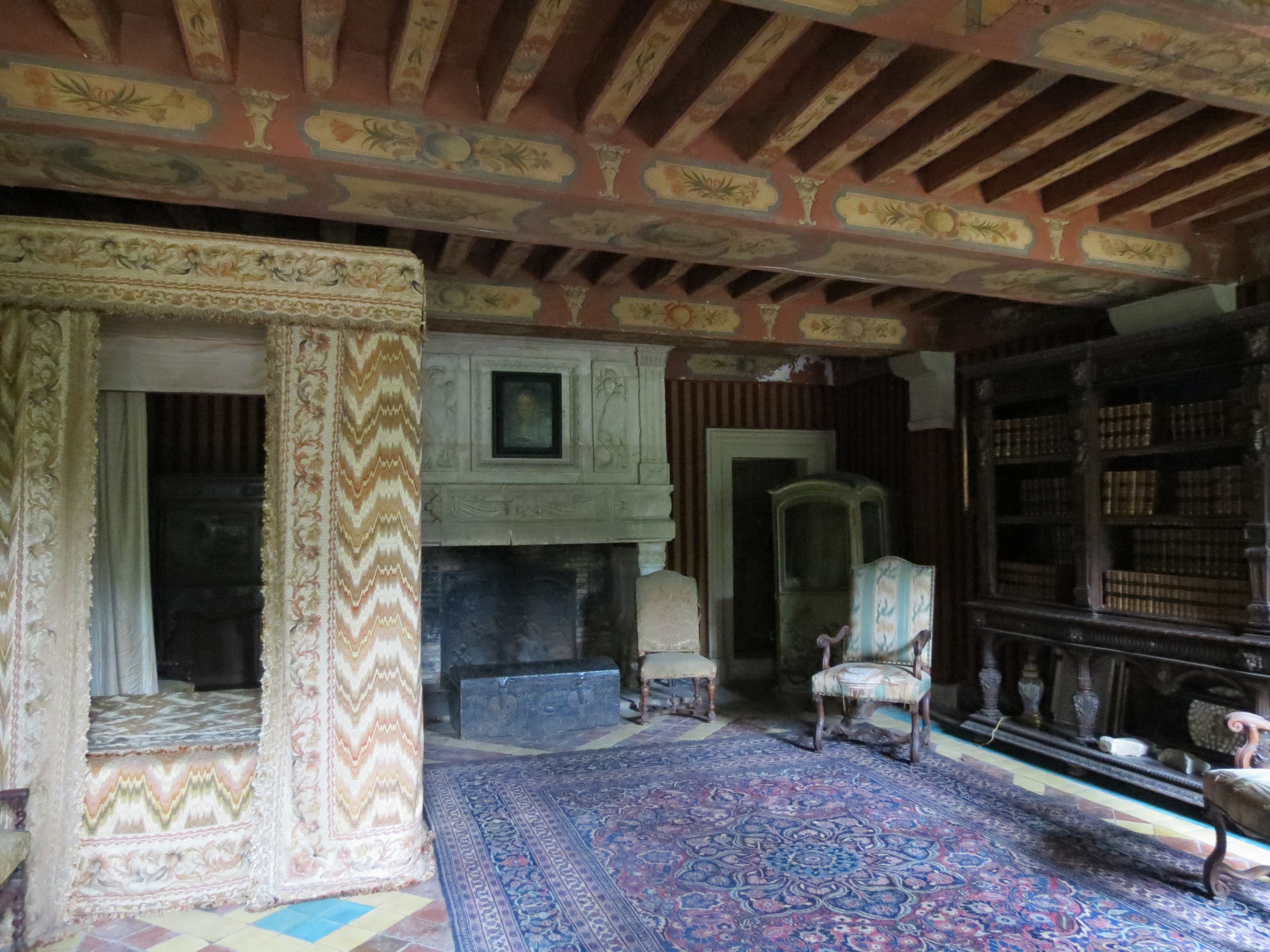

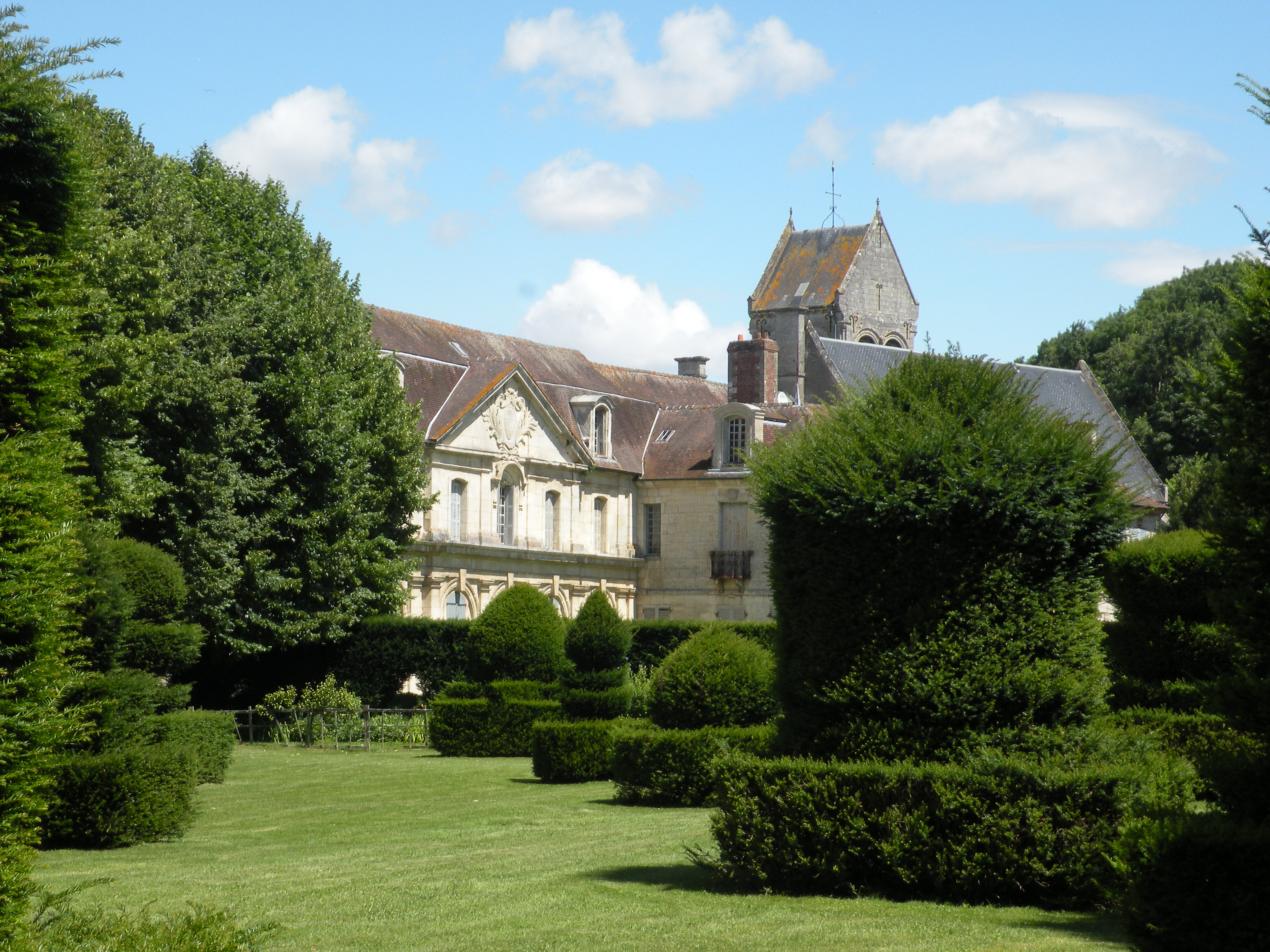

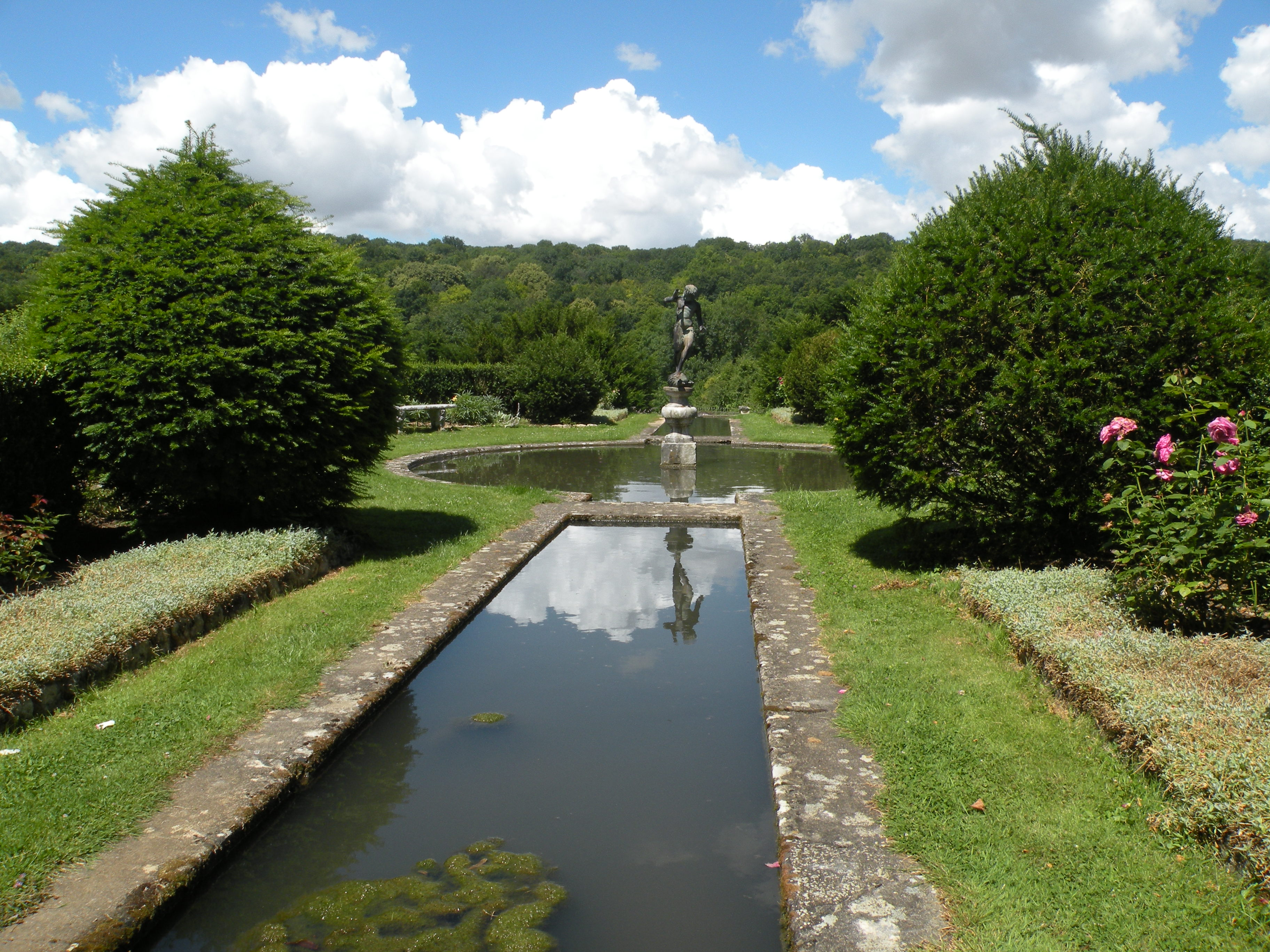
