= Villa Gamberaia =

Monument in Florence, Italy

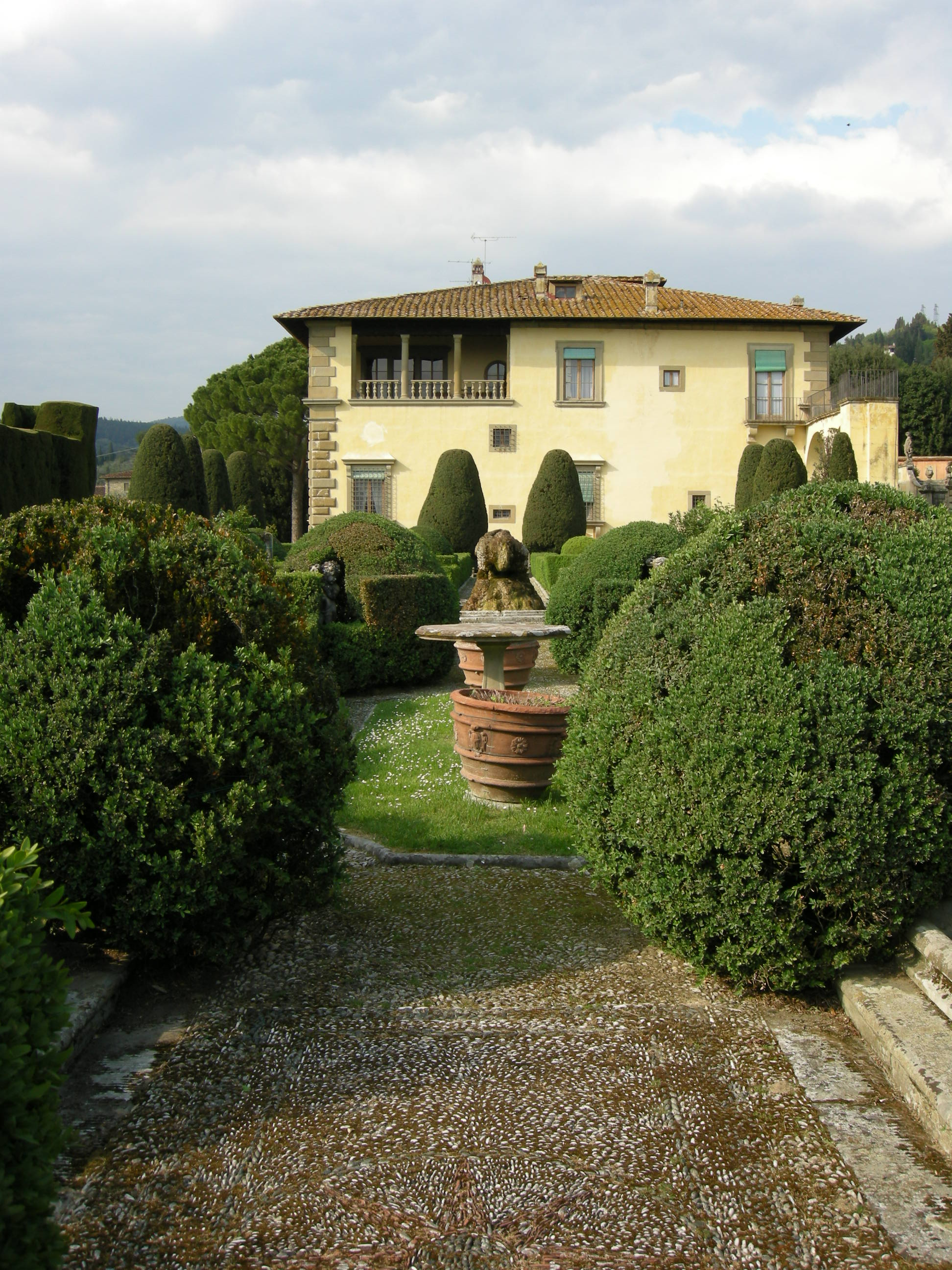
- Villa Gamberaia in 2011
- Interactive map of Villa Gamberaia
- Location: Florence - Italy

Villa Gamberaia, built in the Tuscan style by the Florentine gentleman-merchant Zanobi Lapi in the early 1600s, is located on the hillside of Settignano, overlooking the city of Florence, Italy and the surrounding Arno Valley.

The villa is celebrated for the unique design of its gardens, originally laid out by Zanobi Lapi and his nephews in the first half of the seventeenth century and preserved until now with few major changes. According to Edith Wharton, the Gamberaia was "probably the most perfect example of the art of producing a great effect on a small scale". The design has inspired landscape and garden architects throughout the world, including Charles Platt, A. E. Hanson, and Ellen Shipman in the United States and Cecil Pinsent and Pietro Porcinai in Italy and the UK. In 2010 the Gamberaia was chosen as the model for the "RCSF Tuscan garden", recreated at Snug Harbor, Staten Island, New York.

== History ==
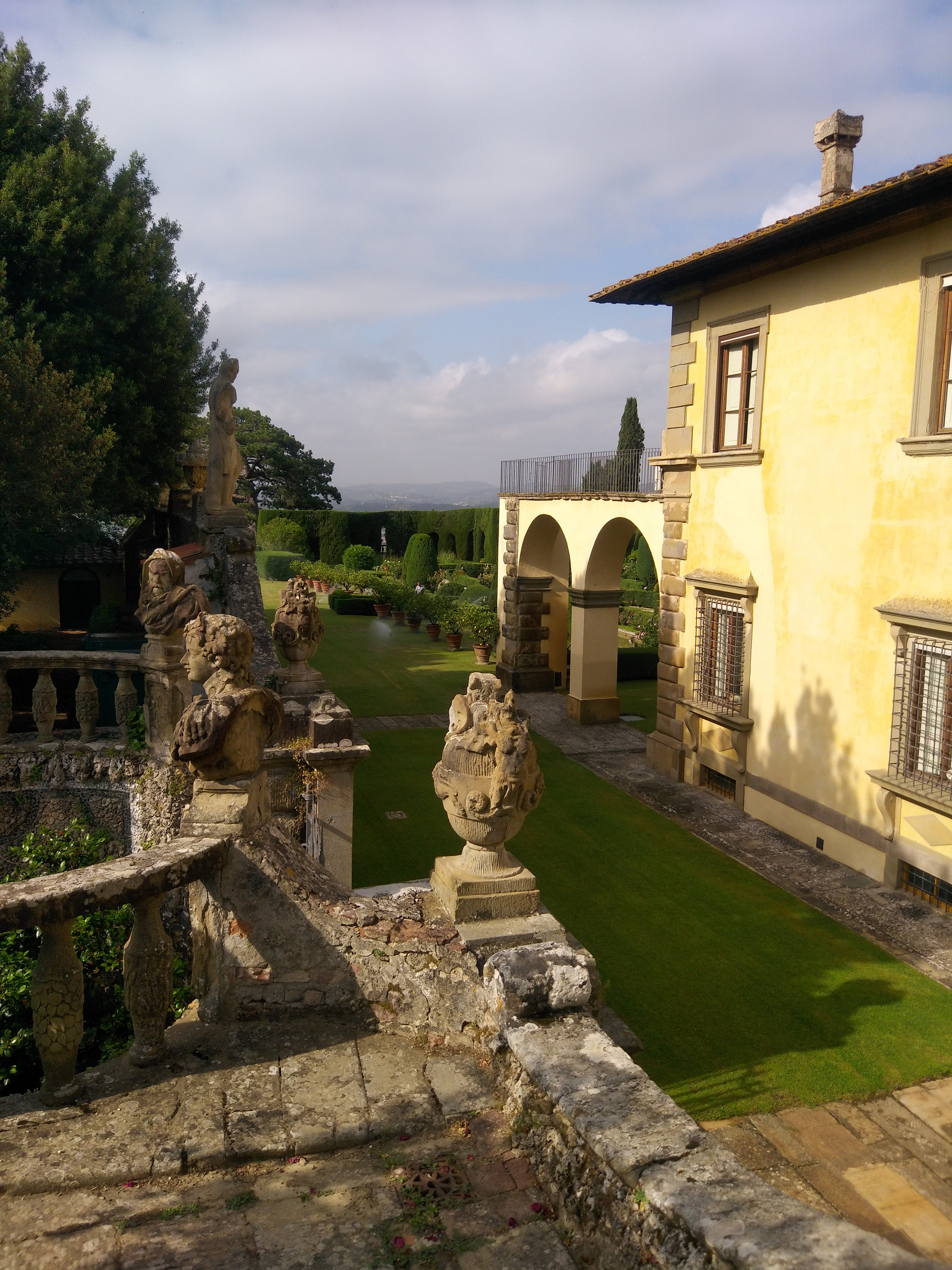

The first mention of the property dates to the late fourteenth century and refers to the grant to Giovanni Benozzo in 1398 of a farm and house in the place called Gamberaia by the Abbess of San Martino a Mensola. The place-name "gamberaia" probably refers to the farming of fresh-water shrimp in local ponds. During the fifteenth and sixteenth centuries a house with land, in part cultivated, in part planted with vineyards belonged to the Gamberelli family: Matteo, his sons, among whom the well-known sculptors and architects Antonio and Bernardo "Rossellino", and their descendants.

In 1610 the property was acquired by Zanobi Lapi, a wealthy and cultivated Florentine merchant with ties to the Medici court, and it is he and his nephews who were responsible for the construction of the villa, on the foundations of an earlier casa da signore, and the subsequent layout of the gardens. Evidence of Lapi ownership and patronage is visible in an inscription on the architrave of a door inside the east entrance to the villa ("Zenobius Lapius erexit ac fundavit A.D. MDCX") and in the heraldic lions carved on vases above the gate to the gabinetto rustico and in the relief sculptures of the nymphaeum (or 'Neptune grotto'). Documents of Zanobi's time mention a limonaia, a lawn area, and ilex woods, which remain essential parts of the garden plan, and the conduits that convey water from the springs above the nymphaeum to the several fountains, a complex hydraulic system that still functions today. The architects who built the villa and carried out the massive engineering project that extended the main terrace of the villa to the south, thus creating the long north-south axis of the bowling green and the area of the parterre, have not been identified. Recent studies, however, point to the Florentine architectural tradition of Bartolomeo Ammannati, Bernardo Buontalenti, and Giovanni Battista Caccini and the influence in the gardens and grottos of the theatrical designer Giulio Parigi.

In 1718, as the fortunes of the surviving Lapi declined, the property was divided between the Capponi and Cerretani families. The villa with its formal gardens passed to Piero and Vincenzo Capponi, who undertook its restoration. The Capponi estate map, or cabreo, dating to c.1725, documents their improvements and embellishments, notably in the addition of busts and statues (allegories of the seasons) in the gabinetto rustico. The etching of the villa by Giuseppe Zocchi, included in his Vedute delle Ville e d'altri luoghi della Toscana of 1744, depicts its handsome façade facing Florence, the series of terraces on which the house and gardens were constructed, the recent planting of young cypresses along the entrance road and southern edge of the garden avenue, and the fountain displays. Two other etchings show the entrance gate on via del Rossellino and the country roads skirting the villa to the northeast. Zocchi's prints were especially popular among visitors on the Grand Tour and reveal the growing international prestige of the Gamberaia.

Following the sale of the villa in 1854 by the last Capponi owner to Pietro Favreau of Guadaloupe, the property passed to members of the D’Outreleau family and, in turn, to the Fazzini, but from the 1890s it appears to have become increasingly neglected. Carlo Placci, Serge Wolkonski, and Gabriele D’Annunzio, who visited the gardens in the 1890s, all noted signs of decay – though they also felt its mysterious, poetic atmosphere.[i] It was in fact the very silence and tranquility of the place that attracted the Romanian princess Catherine Jeanne Ghyka, sister of Queen Nathalie of Serbia, and inspired her to purchase the villa in 1896

=== The Women of the Gamberaia, 1896-1952 ===
In the following years, 1898-1900, Princess Ghyka undertook the most audacious intervention in the garden since its creation—and the only major innovation to date—replacing the old flower beds of the Capponi parterre, which in the meantime had deteriorated into a mere kitchen garden, with elegant, mirror-like pools, bordered with colorful flowering plants. Although initially the new design drew both criticism and applause, the parterre d'eau soon became the iconic feature of the Gamberaia, painted, photographed, and studied by artists, architects, and garden lovers from around the world.

The gardens were also a favorite gathering place for friends and families of Pr.ss Ghyka and her American companion, the artist Florence Blood, and of Anglo-American and European expatriates who made their homes on the hills of Settignano and Fiesole, among them Benard and Mary Berenson at Villa I Tatti, Janet Ross at Poggio Gherardo, Vernon Lee at Il Palmerino, and Sybil Cutting and Geoffrey Scott at Villa Medici. Neighbors and visitors also included Leo and Nina Stein, Neith Boyce and her husband Hutchins Hapgood, the artist Edward Bruce, the stage and costume designer Léon Bakst, the sculptor Adolf von Hildebrand, the collectors of Cézanne Egisto Fabbri and Charles Loeser, and Arthur Acton. As Bernard Berenson later recalled, "for years Gamberaia remained one of the fari [beacons], one of the haunts of my life."

It was not long, however, before WWI and the Russian Revolution disrupted the leisurely and relatively carefree life-style of the two women at the Gamberaia. In 1925 Florence Blood died after a long illness contracted during her hospital service in France during the war and Princess Ghyka, who had lost most of her lands and their revenues during the Russian Revolution, sold the villa and retired to a smaller house nearby. It was said that she did not approve of the changes that the new owner, the American-born Maud Cass Ledyard, widow of the German diplomat Baron von Ketteler, made in the parterre, where the flowering borders of the pools were replaced with trimmed box and sculpted yews and cypress, creating a more formal, evergreen and architectonic effect in the Neo-Renaissance style.

During WWII the villa was expropriated by the Fascist government (along with other properties throughout Italy belonging to Jews and citizens of 'enemy nations') and occupied in part by the Istituto geografico militare di Firenze and in part, from the spring of 1944, by a German command. In August it was devastated by fire set by the retreating German forces, destroying most of the interior. In 1952 Baroness von Ketteler, who had returned to the States, donated the property, which she had left in the hands of her caretaker, to the Vatican.

=== Recent History, 1954 to the present ===
The recent history of the property is linked to the name of Marcello Marchi, a Florentine industrialist who acquired the villa from the Vatican in 1954 and who worked closely with the architect Raffaello Trinci to rebuild and renovate the house and restore the gardens. In 1956 they were declared of national historic and artistic importance and opened to the public. A decade later the Hungarian-American architect and photographer Balthazar Korab immortalized the gardens in his famous photographic essay, Gamberaia.

In 1994 the property passed to Franca Marchi (d. 1998) and her husband Luigi Zalum, who has continued to improve and enhance the villa and gardens and provide a venue for private events and cultural initiatives.

=== Contemporary use and Cultural Activities ===
Villa Gamberaia remains a privately managed historic residence and garden. Alongside the conservation and restoration of the property and its gardens, the estate is used for hospitality, private stays and events, including weddings, cultural gatherings and other private functions. The historic gardens are also open to visitors by prior arrangement.

In recent years, the Villa has sought to develop its role as a venue for cultural and artistic activity. It established an Artist Residency programme, A Stage in Nature, which invites artists to live and work at Gamberaia and to develop projects inspired by the relationship between art, architecture, landscape and the natural environment. The programme includes site-specific artistic projects and has subsequently been expanded to encompass music, with residencies intended for musicians and composers.

The Villa and its gardens have continued to attract international media attention. In 2025, The New York Times included Villa Gamberaia in its selection of 25 gardens to see in a lifetime. In August 2026, the Financial Times published an article by garden writer Robin Lane Fox entitled “The Serenity of an Italian Masterpiece”, examining the history of the gardens, their twentieth-century restoration and their continuing development.

These contemporary activities combine the preservation of the historic property with its continuing use as a residence and meeting place. Hospitality, private events, garden visits and cultural programmes, including the Artist Residency, form part of the Villa's present-day activities.

== Gallery ==
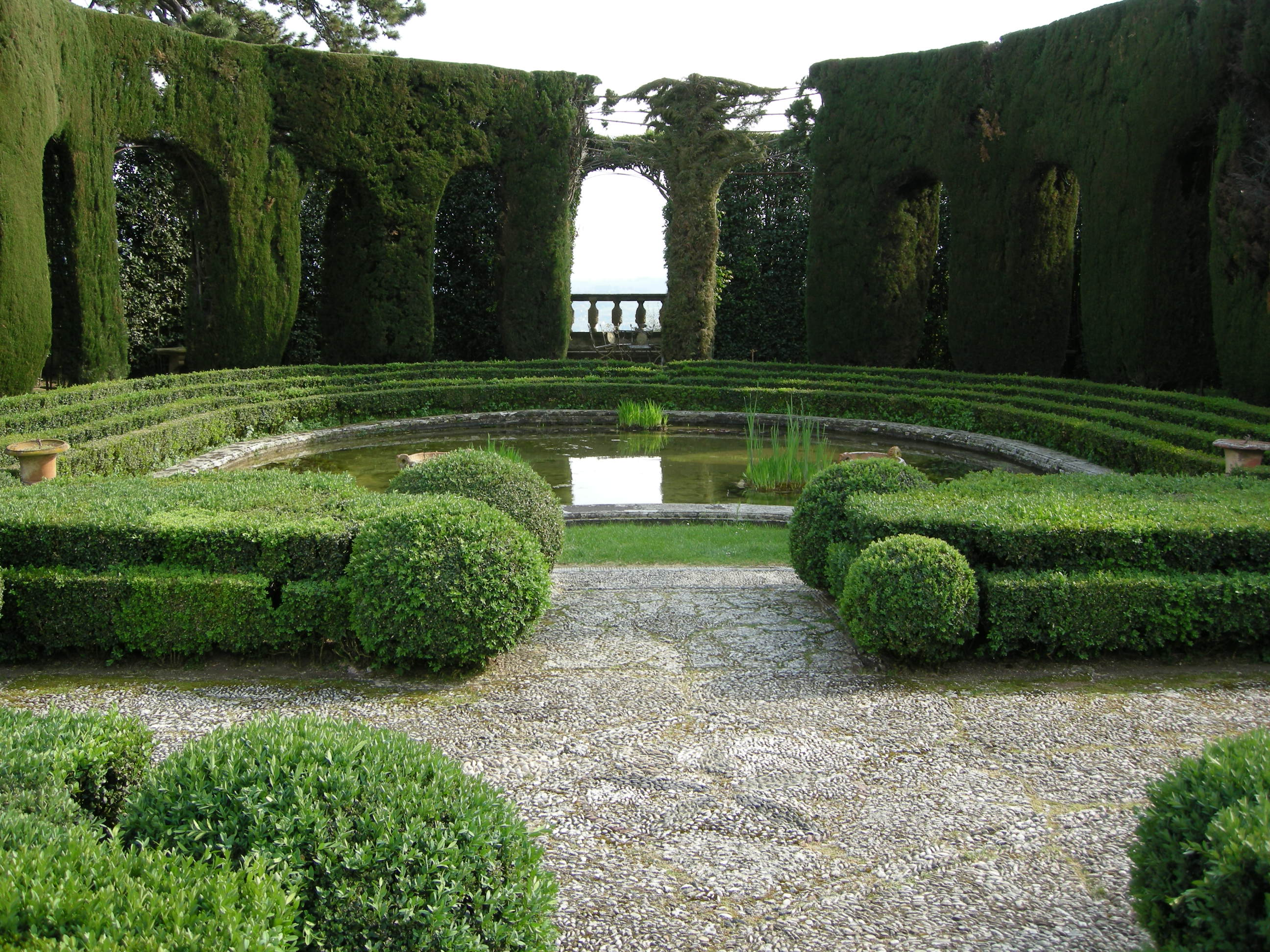
The hemicycle

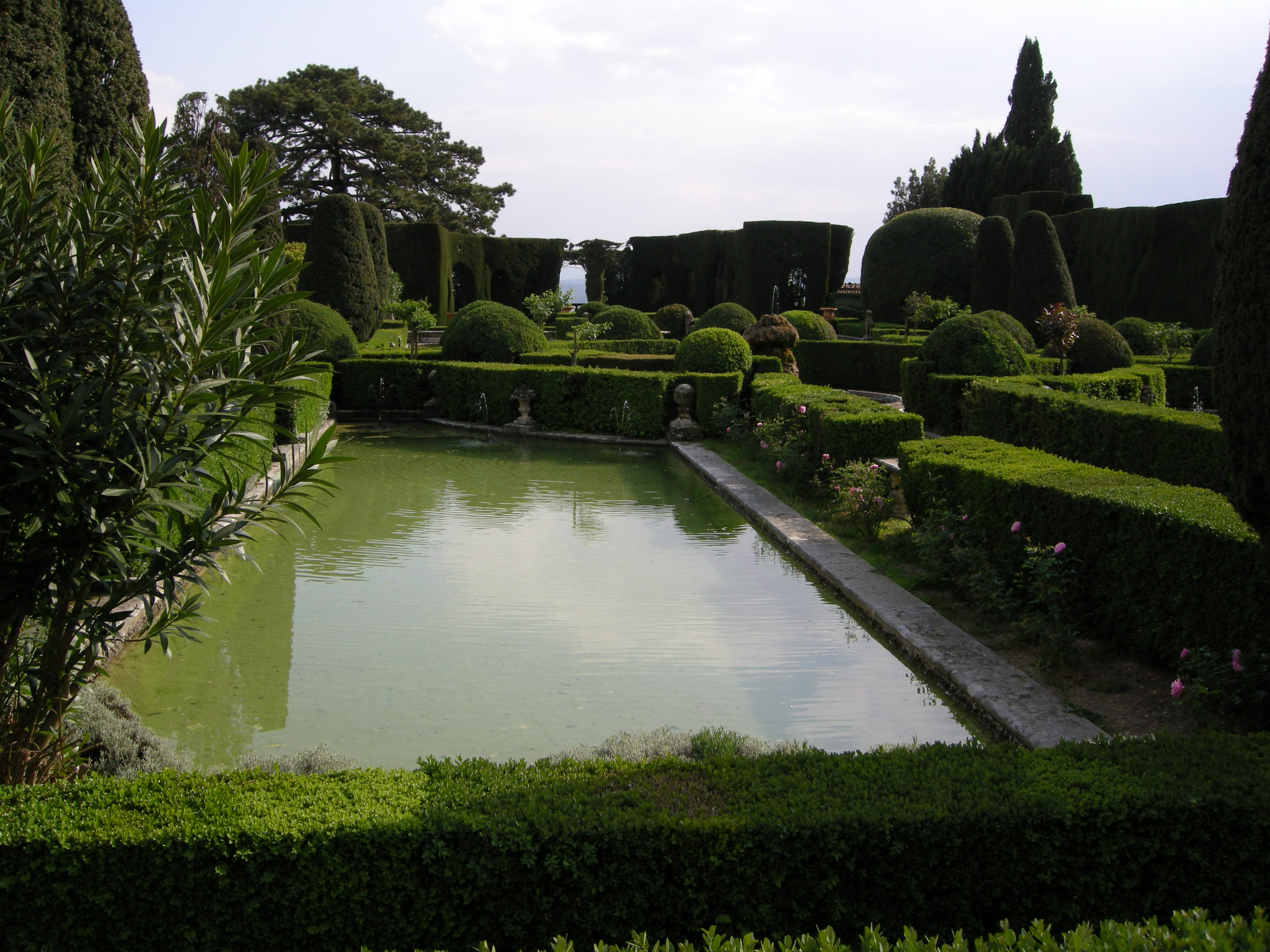
Water parterre

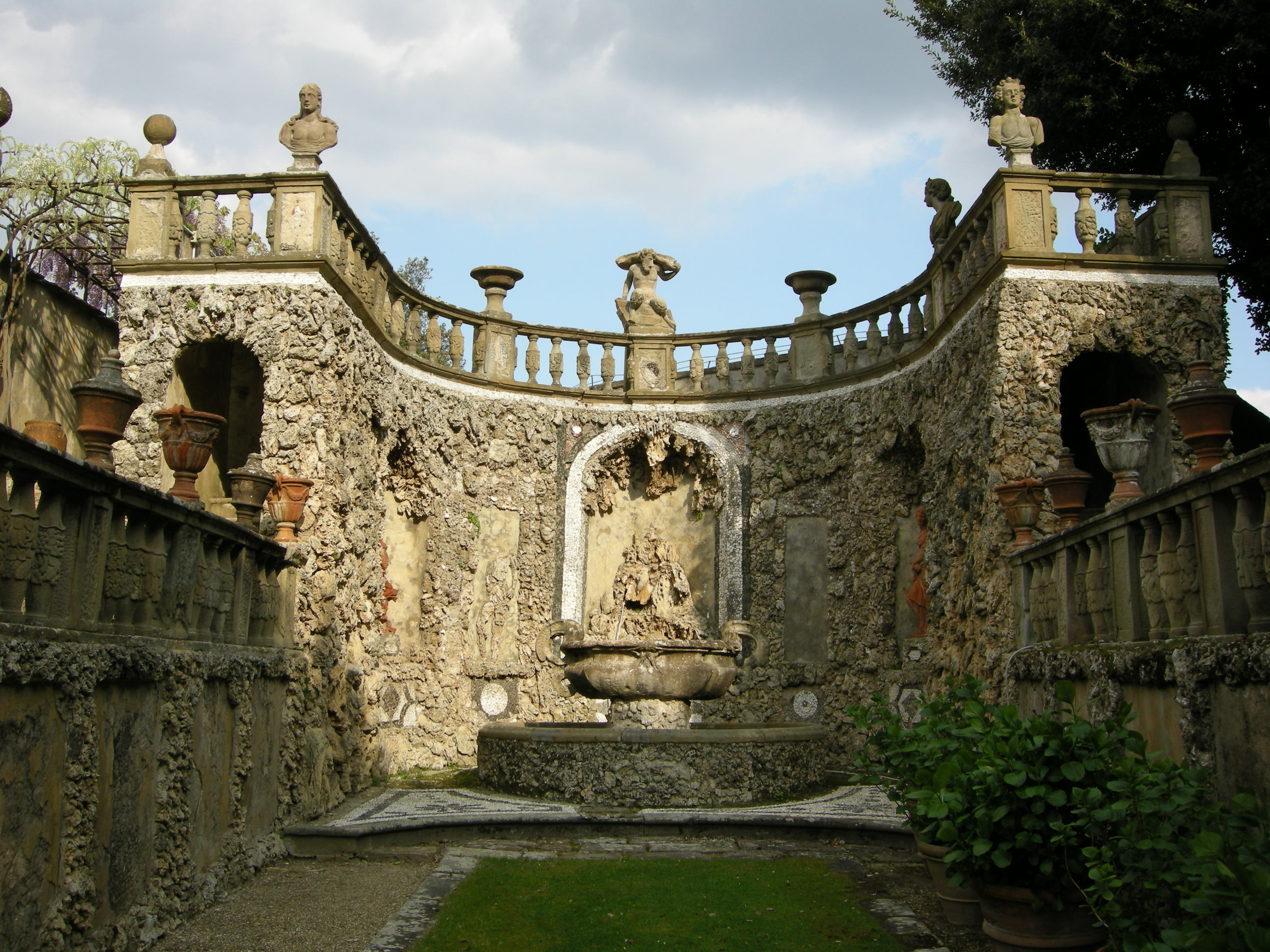
The rustic cabinet

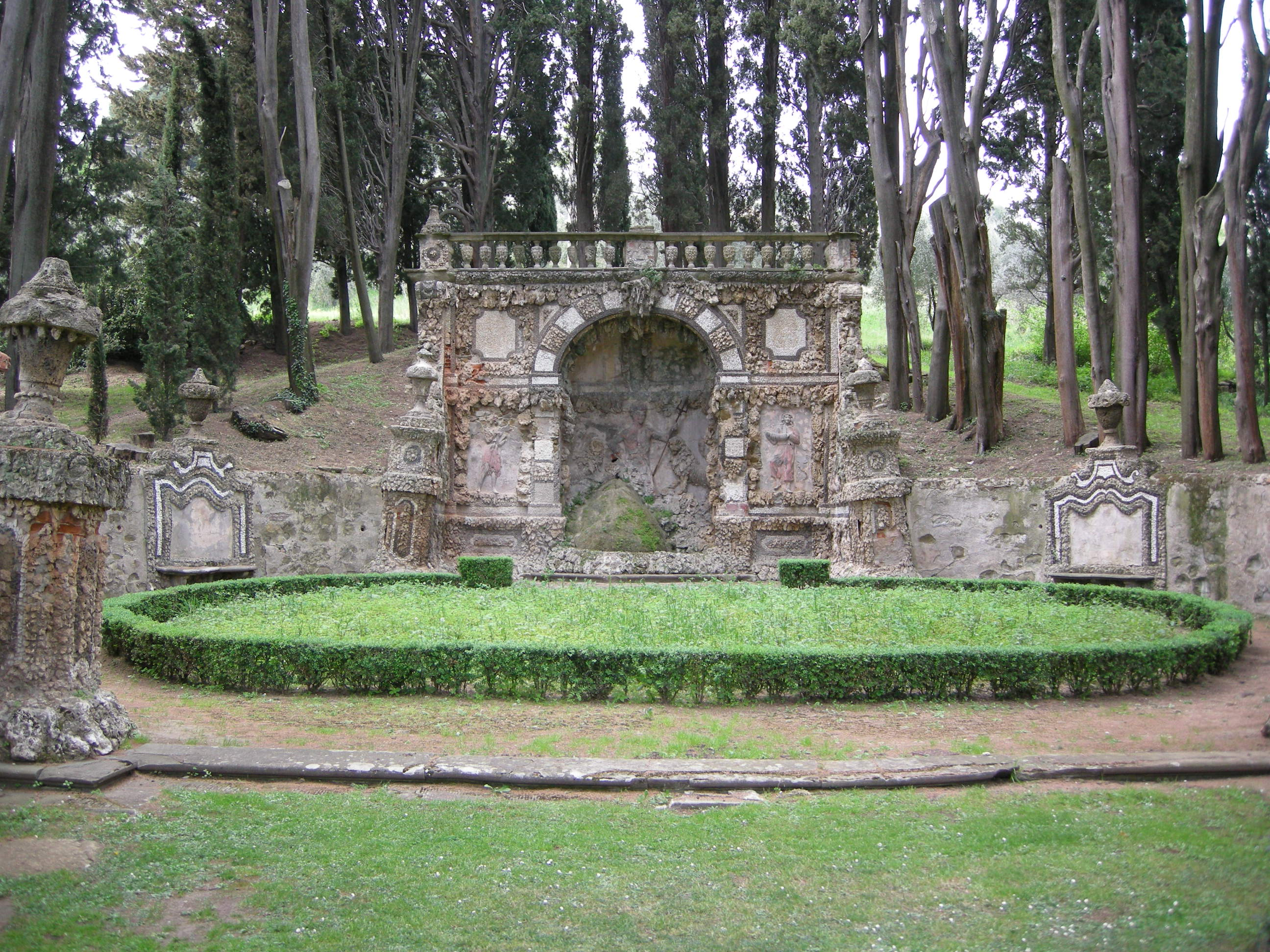
Nymphaeum

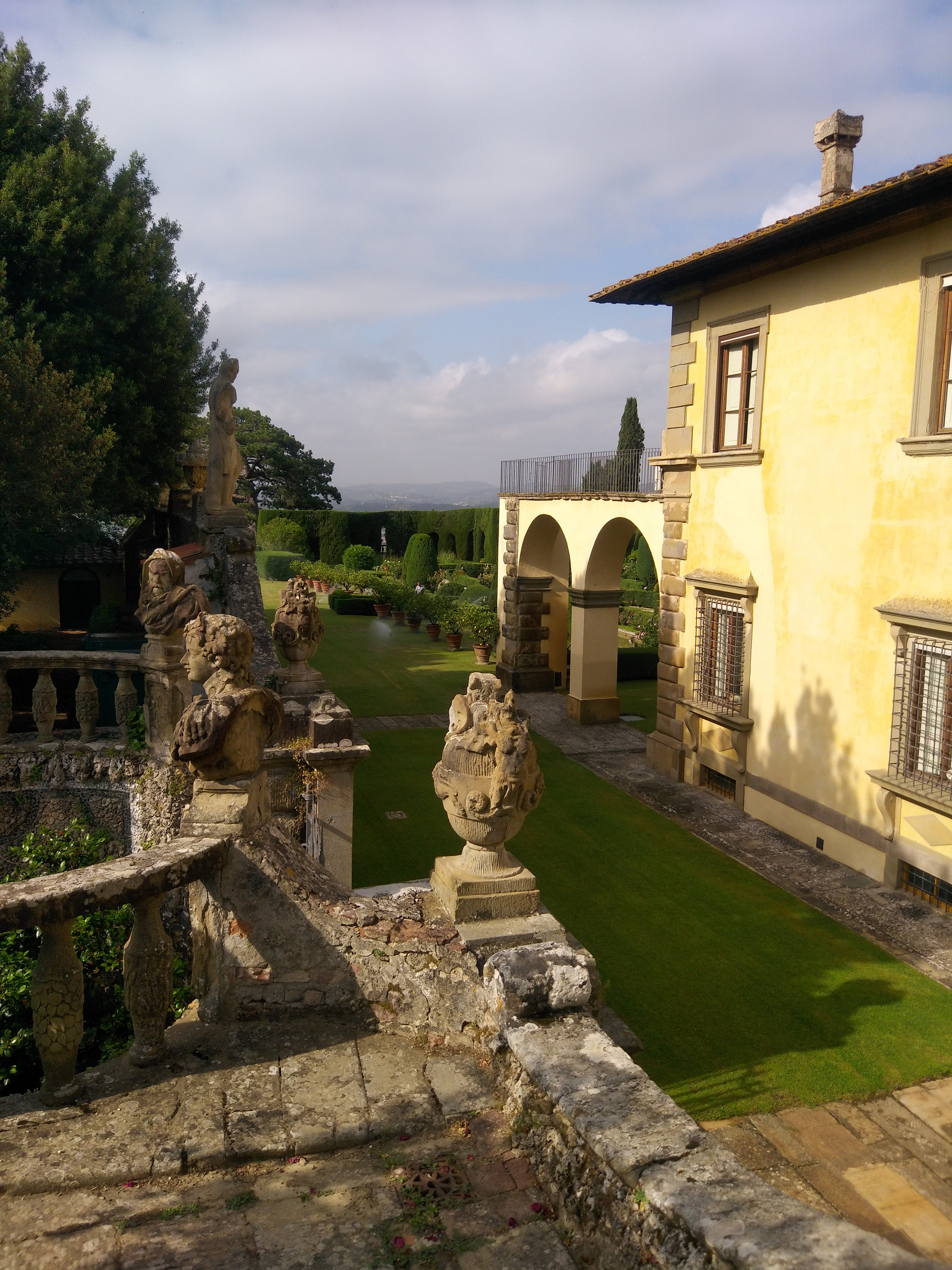
View from the upper terrace

== Select Bibliography ==
History and Design of the Villa and Gardens

- Villa Gamberaia: Sources and Interpretations, special issue of Studies in the History of Gardens & Designed Landscapes, 22 (2002), guest ed., P. Osmond.
  Includes essays on the Gamberaia by Mario Bevilacqua, Marcello Fagiolo, Maia Gahtan, Margherita Caputo, Patricia Osmond, Vincenzo Cazzato.
- Revisiting the Gamberaia: An Anthology of Essays, ed. with Preface, Introduction, and Notes by P. J. Osmond
  Includes historic essays on the Gamberaia (1901-1973) by Janet Ross, Edith Wharton, E. March Phillipps (with photos by Charles Latham), H. Inigo Triggs, Henry V. Hubbard, Geoffrey Jellicoe (with drawings by J.C. Shepherd), Georgina Masson, and Harold Acton, with Introduction, prefaces to each essay, and notes.
- Judith Kinnard, ““The Villa Gamberaia in Settignano: The Street in the Garden,” Journal of Garden History 6 (1986): 1-18.
- Gian Luca Simonini. “Il giardino di Gamberaia e l’addizione di Catherine Jeanne Ghyka,” Storia urbana 85 (1998) 151-70.
- Luigi Zangheri,. "Pietro Porcinai e La Gamberaia," in I giardini del XX secolo: l'opera di Pietro Porcinai, ed. Maria Chiara Pozzana (Florence: Alinea, 1998), 131-138.
- Luigi Zangheri,. “Islamische Einflüsse in der Europäischen Gartenkunst am Beispiel der Villa Gamberaia,” in Historische Gärten heute, ed. M. Rohde and R. Schomann (Leipzig: 2003), 52-57.

Guides

- Mariachiara Pozzana, Villa Gamberaia (Florence: Edizioni Casalta, 2015).

Photographic Studies

- Balthazar Korab, Gamberaia. Photo essay, with text by Harold Acton. (Florence: Centro Di, 1971).
