= Palais-Royal =

Palace and an associated garden located in the 1st arrondissement of Paris

Coordinates: 48°51′48″N 2°20′13″E

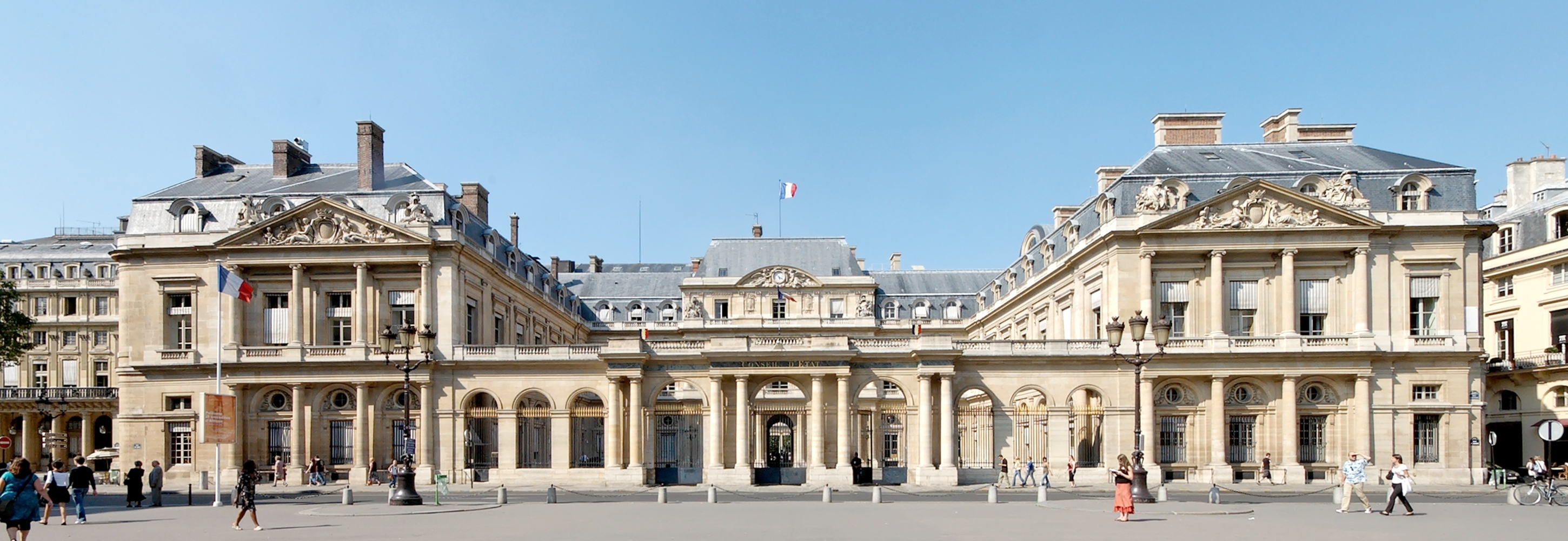
- Entrance front of the Palais-Royal

General information
- Location: Paris, France, 204 Rue Saint-Honoré, Place du Palais-Royal
- Current tenants: Conseil d'État, Ministry of Culture, Constitutional Council
- Construction started: 1633
- Completed: 1639
- Renovated: 1698–1700; 1719–1729; 1753–1779; 1782–1783; 1791–1793; 1828–1830
- Client: Cardinal Richelieu

Design and construction
- Architects: Jacques Lemercier; Jules Hardouin-Mansart; Gilles-Marie Oppenord; Pierre Contant d'Ivry; Pierre-Louis Moreau; Victor Louis; Pierre Fontaine; Charles Percier

Website
- domaine-palais-royal.fr

The Palais-Royal (French: [pa.lɛ ʁwa.jal]) is a former French royal palace located on Rue Saint-Honoré in the 1st arrondissement of Paris. The screened entrance court faces the Place du Palais-Royal, opposite the Louvre. Originally called the Palais-Cardinal, it was built for Cardinal Richelieu from about 1633 to 1639 by architect Jacques Lemercier. Richelieu bequeathed it to Louis XIII, before Louis XIV gave it to his younger brother, Philippe I, Duke of Orléans. As the succeeding Dukes of Orléans made such extensive alterations over the years, almost nothing remains of Lemercier's original design.

The Palais-Royal is now the seat of the Ministry of Culture, the Conseil d'État and the Constitutional Council. The central Palais-Royal Garden (Jardin du Palais-Royal) serves as a public park; its arcade houses shops.

== History ==
=== Palais-Cardinal ===
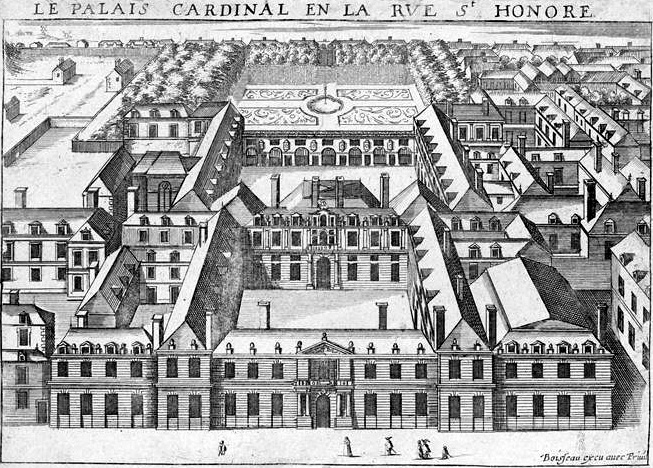
The Palais-Cardinal, c. 1641

Originally called the Palais-Cardinal, the palace was the personal residence of Cardinal Richelieu. The architect Jacques Lemercier began his design in 1629; Construction commenced in 1633 and was completed in 1639. The gardens were begun in 1629 by Jean Le Nôtre (father of André Le Nôtre), Simon Bouchard, and Pierre I Desgots, to a design created by Jacques Boyceau. Upon Richelieu's death in 1642 the palace became the property of the King and acquired the new name Palais-Royal.

After Louis XIII died the following year, it became the home of the Queen Mother Anne of Austria and her young sons Louis XIV and Philippe, duke of Anjou, along with her advisor Cardinal Mazarin.

From 1649, the palace was the residence of the exiled Henrietta Maria and Henrietta Anne Stuart, wife and daughter of the executed King Charles I of England. The two had escaped England in the midst of the English Civil War and were sheltered by Henrietta Maria's nephew, King Louis XIV.

The Palais Brion, a separate section near the rue de Richelieu to the west of the Palais-Royal, was purchased by Louis XIV from the heirs of Cardinal Richelieu. Louis had it connected to the Palais-Royal. It was at the Palais Brion that Louis had his mistress Louise de La Vallière stay while his affair with Madame de Montespan was still an official secret.

=== Philippe I, Duke of Orléans ===
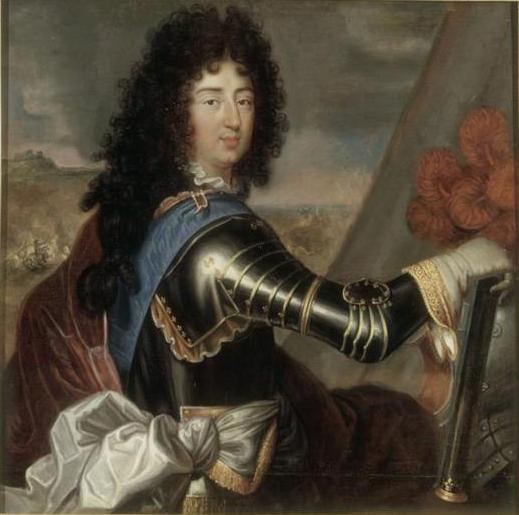
Philippe de France, duc d'Orléans the younger brother of Louis XIV.

Henrietta Anne was married to Louis' younger brother, Philippe I, Duke of Orléans in the palace chapel on 31 March 1661. After their marriage, Louis XIV allowed his brother and wife to use the Palais-Royal as their main Paris residence. The following year the new duchess gave birth to a daughter, Marie Louise d'Orléans, inside the palace. She created the ornamental gardens of the palace, which were said to be among the most beautiful in Paris. Under the new ducal couple, the Palais-Royal would become the social center of the capital.

The palace was redecorated and new apartments were created for the Duchess's maids and staff. Several of the women who later came to be favourites to King Louis XIV were from her household: Louise de La Vallière, who gave birth there to two sons of the King, in 1663 and 1665; Madame de Montespan, who supplanted Louise; and Angélique de Fontanges, who was in service to the second Duchess of Orléans.

The court gatherings at the Palais-Royal were famed all around the capital as well as all of France. It was at these parties that the crème de la crème of French society came to see and be seen. Guests included the main members of the royal family like the Queen Mother, Anne of Austria; Anne, Duchess of Montpensier, and the Prince of Condé and Conti. Philippe's favourites were also frequent visitors.

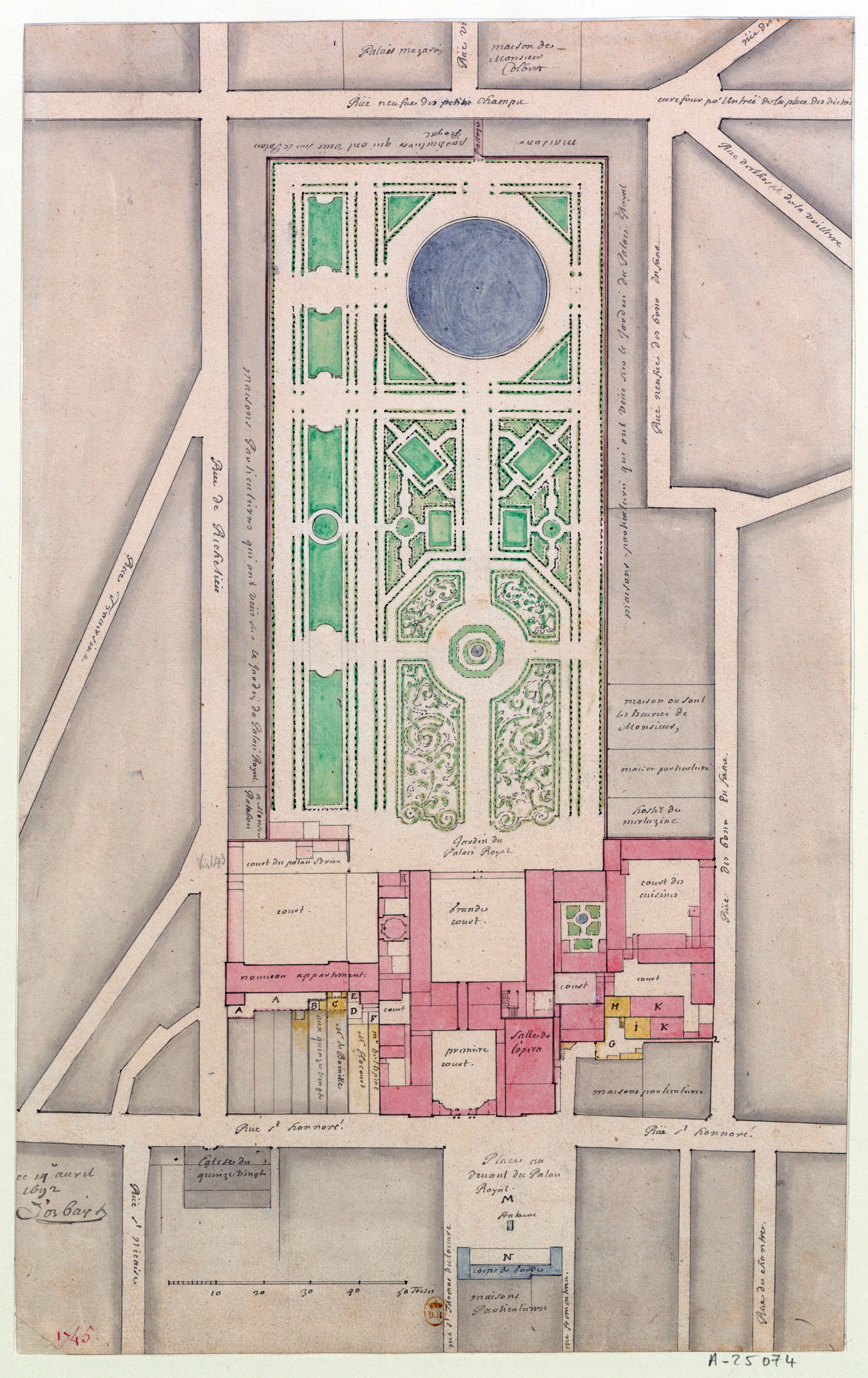
General site plan (1692) by François d'Orbay, showing the gardens as redesigned by André Le Nôtre around 1674

After Henrietta Anne died in 1670 the Duke took a second wife, the Princess Palatine, who preferred to live in the Château de Saint-Cloud. Saint-Cloud thus became the main residence of her eldest son and the heir to the House of Orléans, Philippe Charles d'Orléans known as the Duke of Chartres.

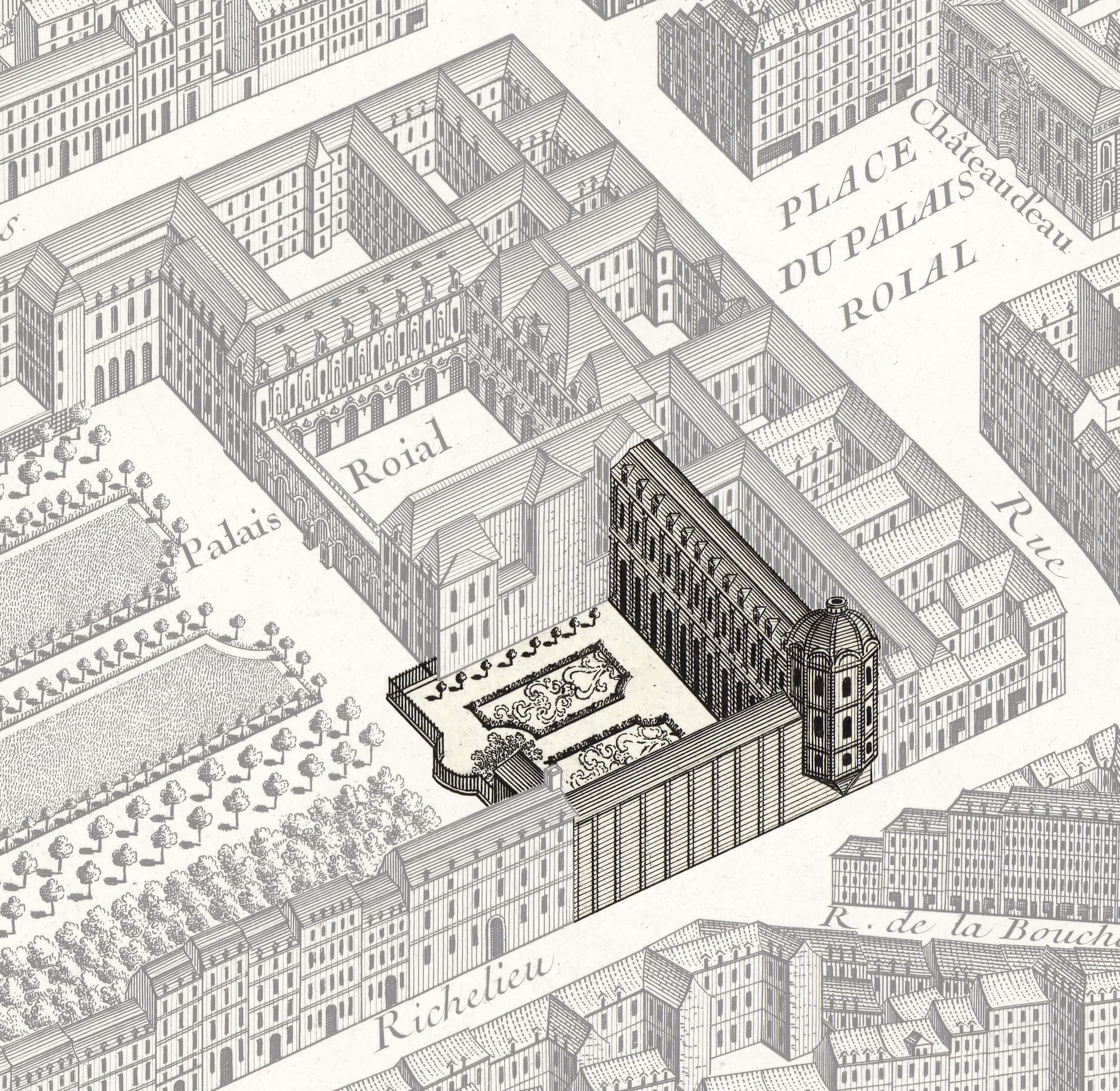
The Palais Brion on the 1739 Turgot map of Paris

The Académie Royale de Peinture et de Sculpture occupied the Palais Brion from 1661 to 1691 and shared it with the Académie Royale d'Architecture from 1672. The royal collection of antiquities was installed there under the care of the art critic and official court historian André Félibien, who was appointed in 1673.

About 1674 the Duke of Orléans had André Le Nôtre redesign the gardens of the Palais-Royal.

After the dismissal of Madame de Montespan and the arrival of her successor, Madame de Maintenon, who forbade any lavish entertainment at Versailles, the Palais-Royal was again a social highlight.

In 1692, on the occasion of the marriage of the duke of Chartres to Françoise Marie de Bourbon, Mademoiselle de Blois, a legitimised daughter of Louis XIV and Madame de Montespan, the King deeded the Palais-Royal to his brother. The new couple did not occupy the northeast wing, where Anne of Austria had originally lived, but instead chose to reside in the Palais Brion. For the convenience of the bride, new apartments were built and furnished in the wing facing east on the rue de Richelieu.

It was at this time that Philippe commissioned a Grande Galerie along the rue de Richelieu for his famous Orleans Collection of paintings, which was easily accessible to the public. Designed by the architect Jules Hardouin-Mansart, it was constructed around 1698–1700 and painted with Virgilian subjects by Coypel. The cost of this reconstruction totaled about 400,000 livres. Hardouin-Mansart's assistant, François d'Orbay, prepared a general site plan, showing the Palais-Royal before these alterations were made.

=== Philippe II, Duke of Orléans ===
When the Duke of Orléans died in 1701, his son became the head of the House of Orléans. The new Duke and Duchess of Orléans took up residence at the Palais-Royal. Two of their daughters, Charlotte Aglaé d'Orléans, later the Duchess of Modena, and Louise Diane d'Orléans, later the Princess of Conti, were born there.

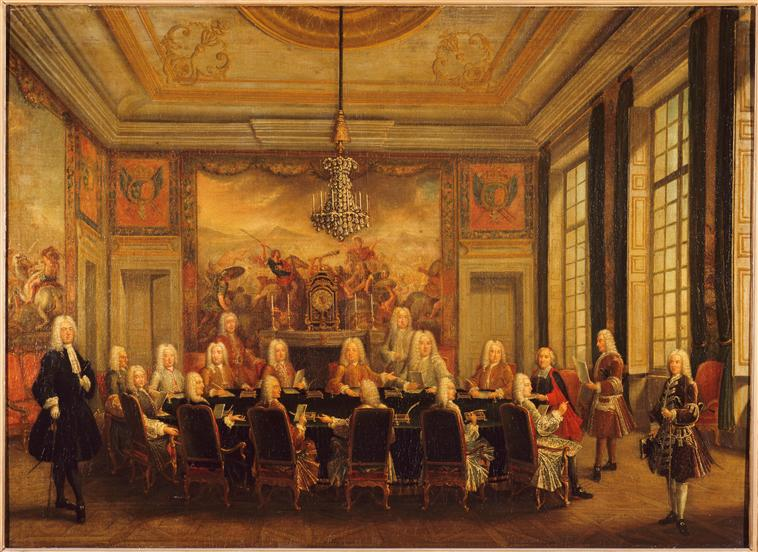
The duc d'Orléans' Council in 1716, with Cardinal Fleury sitting at the Palais-Royal. Gobelins tapestry overdoors are woven with the Orléans arms.

At the death of Louis XIV in 1715, his five-year-old great-grandson succeeded him. The Duke of Orléans became Regent for the young Louis XV, setting up the country's government at the Palais-Royal, while the young king lived at the nearby Tuileries Palace. The Palais-Royal housed the magnificent Orleans Collection of some 500 paintings, which was arranged for public viewing until it was sold abroad in 1791.

He commissioned Gilles-Marie Oppenord to redesign the apartments of the Duchess on the ground floor in 1716 and to decorate the Grand Appartement of the Palais Brion in the light and lively style Régence that foreshadowed the Rococo, as well as the Regent's more intimate petits appartements. Oppenord also made changes to the Grande Galerie of the Palais Brion and created a distinctive Salon d'Angle, which connected the Grand Appartement to the Grande Galerie along the rue de Richelieu (1719–20; visible on the 1739 Turgot map of Paris). All of this work was lost, when the Palais Brion was demolished in 1784 for the construction of the Salle Richelieu, now hosting the Comédie-Française.

=== Louis d'Orléans ===
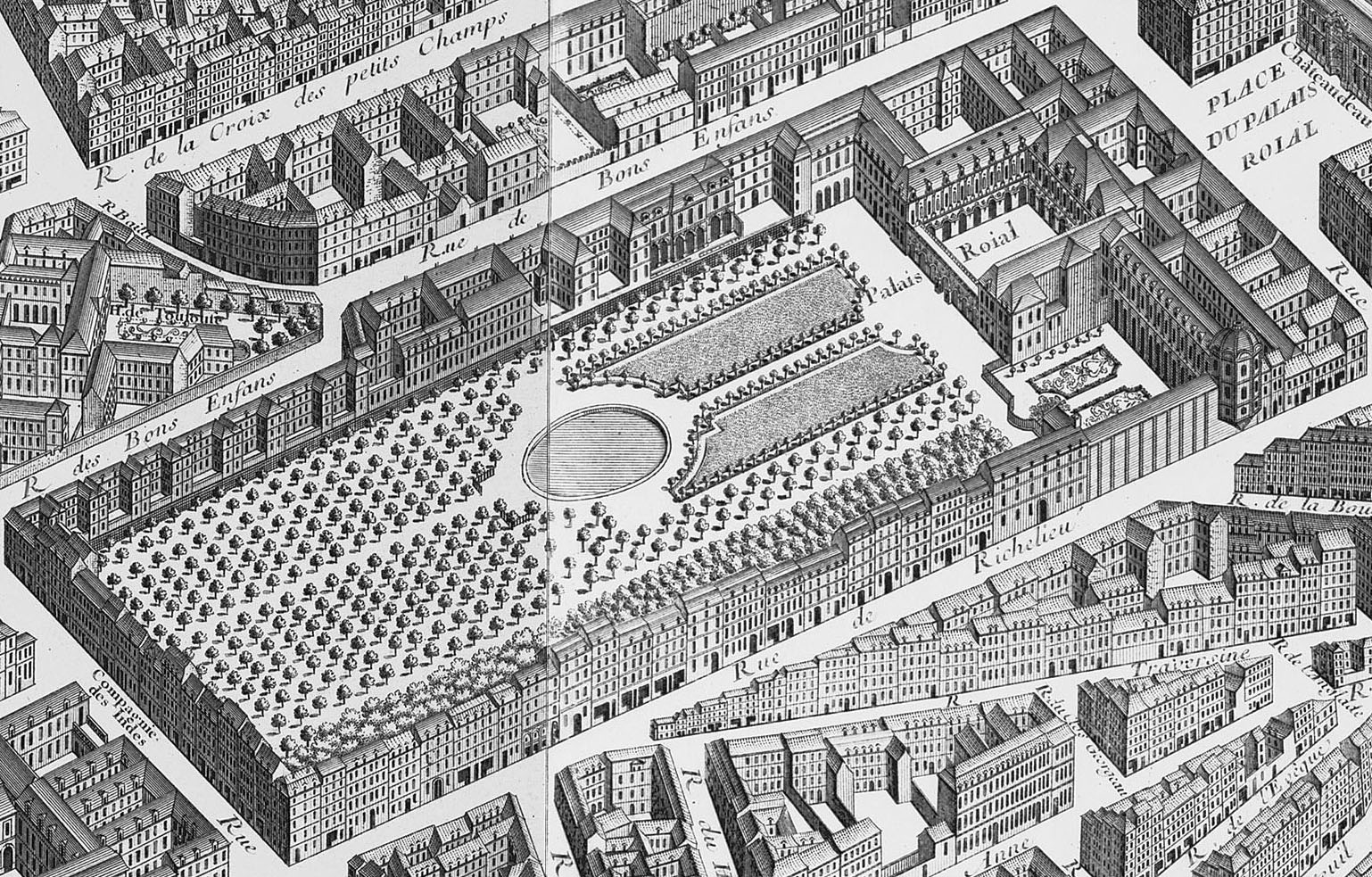
Palais-Royal on the 1739 Turgot map of Paris with the gardens as redesigned by Claude Desgots in 1729. The palace itself fronts on its small square.

After the Regency, the social life of the palace became much more subdued. Louis XV moved the court back to Versailles and Paris was again ignored. The same happened with the Palais-Royal. Louis d'Orléans succeeded his father as the new duke of Orléans in 1723. He and his son Louis Philippe lived at the other family residence in Saint-Cloud, which had been empty since the death of the Princess Palatine in 1722.

Claude Desgots redesigned the gardens of the Palais-Royal in 1729.

=== Louis Philippe I ===
In 1752 Louis Philippe I succeeded his father as the duke of Orléans. The Palais-Royal was soon the scene of the notorious debaucheries of Louise Henriette de Bourbon who had married to Louis Philippe in 1743. New apartments (located in what is now the northern section of the Rue-de-Valois wing) were added for her in the early 1750s by the architect Pierre Contant d'Ivry. She died at the age of thirty-two in 1759. She was the mother of Louis Philippe II, Duke of Orléans, later known as Philippe Égalité. A few years after the death of Louise Henriette, her husband secretly married his mistress, the witty marquise de Montesson, and the couple lived at the Château de Sainte-Assise where he died in 1785. Just before his death, he completed the sale of the Château de Saint-Cloud to Queen Marie Antoinette.

=== Louis Philippe II ===
Louis Philippe II, Duke of Orléans was born at Saint-Cloud and later moved to the Palais-Royal and lived there with his wife, the wealthy Louise Marie Adélaïde de Bourbon whom he had married in 1769. The duke controlled the Palais-Royal from 1780 onward. The couple's eldest son, Louis-Philippe III d'Orléans, was born there in 1773. Louis Philippe II succeeded his father as the head of the House of Orléans in 1785.

==== Theatres of the Palais-Royal ====
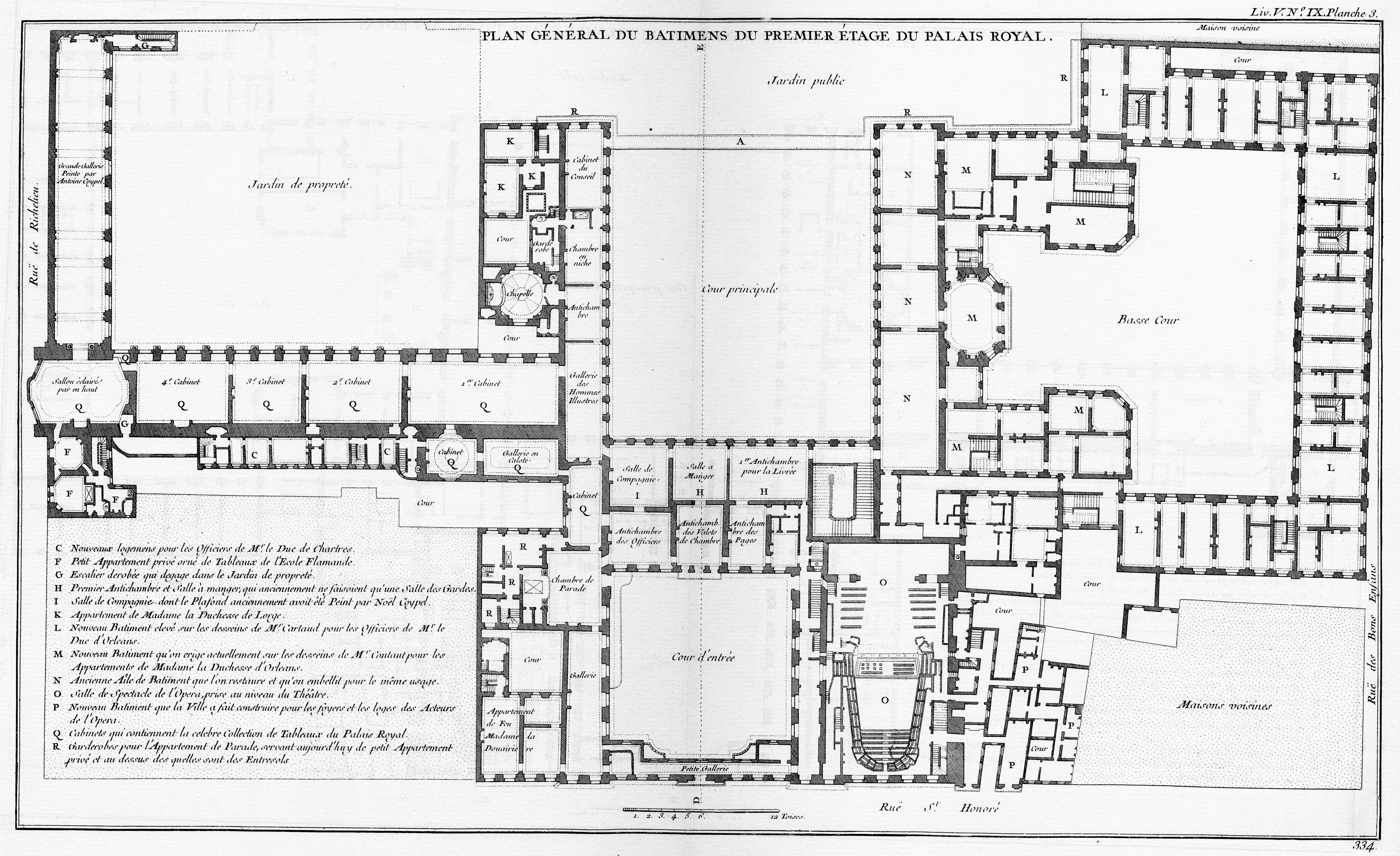
Plan of the Palais-Royal with the theatre in the east wing (Blondel, Architecture françoise, 1754)

The Palais-Royal had contained one of the most important public theatres in Paris, in the east wing on the rue Saint-Honoré (on a site just to the west of what is now the rue de Valois). It was built from 1637 to 1641 to designs by Lemercier and was initially known as the Great Hall of the Palais-Cardinal. This theatre was later used by the troupe of Molière beginning in 1660, by which time it had become known as the Théâtre du Palais-Royal. After Molière's death in 1673 the theatre was taken over by Jean-Baptiste Lully, who used it for his Académie Royale de Musique (the official name of the Paris Opera at that time).

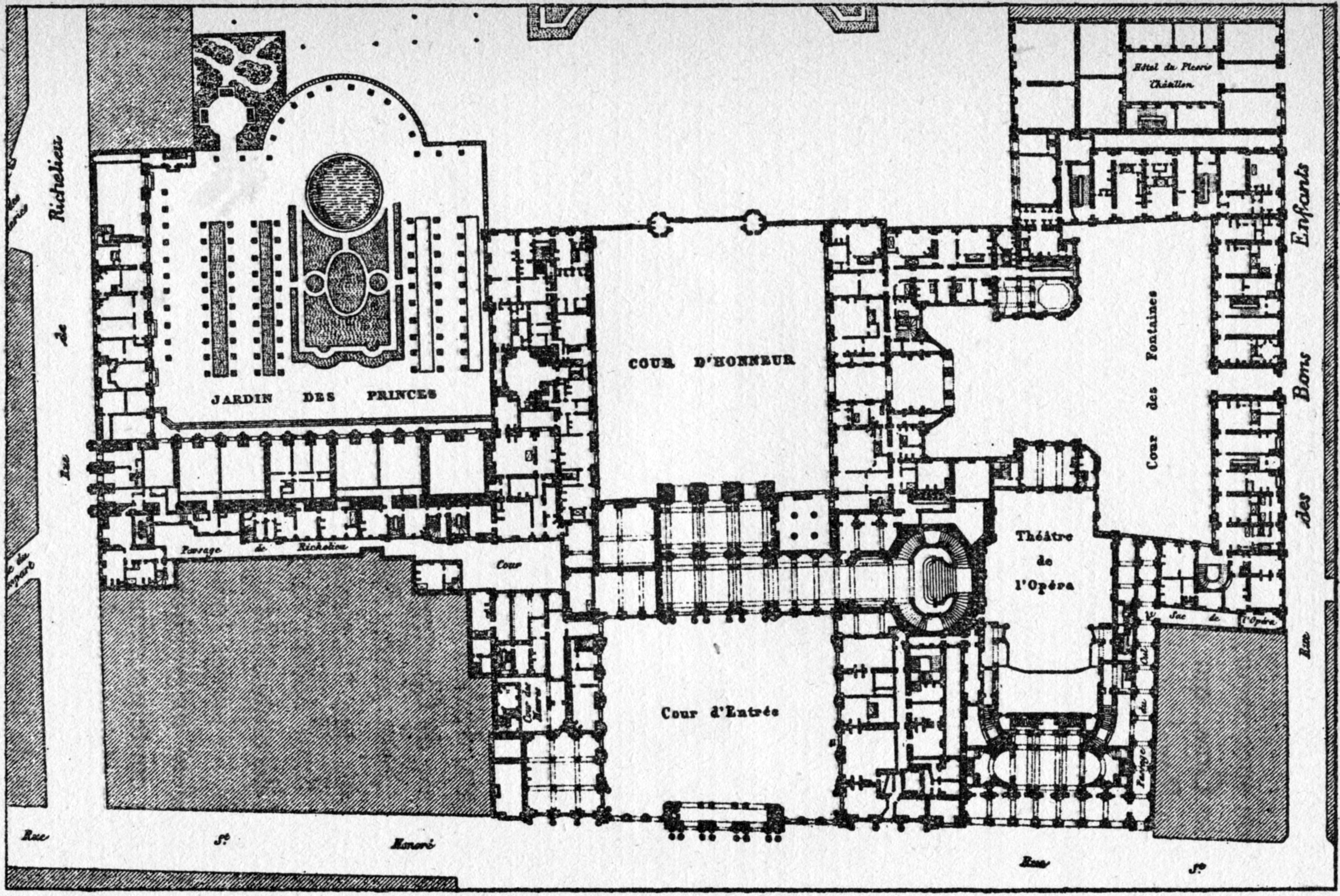
1780 plan of the Palais-Royal with Moreau's opera house (1770–1781)

The Opera's theatre was destroyed by fire in 1763, but was rebuilt to the designs of architect Pierre-Louis Moreau Desproux on a site slightly further to the east (where the rue de Valois is located today) and reopened in 1770. This second theatre continued to be used by the Opera until 1781, when it was also destroyed by fire, but this time it was not rebuilt. Moreau Desproux also designed the adjacent surviving entrance façades of the Palais-Royal.

At the request of Louis Philippe II two new theatres were constructed in the Palais-Royal complex shortly after the fire. Both of these new theatres were designed by Victor Louis, the architect who also designed the shopping galleries facing the garden (see below). The first theatre, which opened on 23 October 1784, was a small puppet theatre in the northwest corner of the gardens at the intersection of the Galerie de Montpensier and the Galerie de Beaujolais. Initially it was known as the Théâtre des Beaujolais, then as the Théâtre Montansier, after which Victor Louis enlarged it for the performance of plays and operas. Later, beginning with the political turmoil of the Revolution, this theatre was known by a variety of other names. It was converted to a café with shows in 1812, but reopened as a theatre in 1831, when it acquired the name Théâtre du Palais-Royal, by which it is still known today.

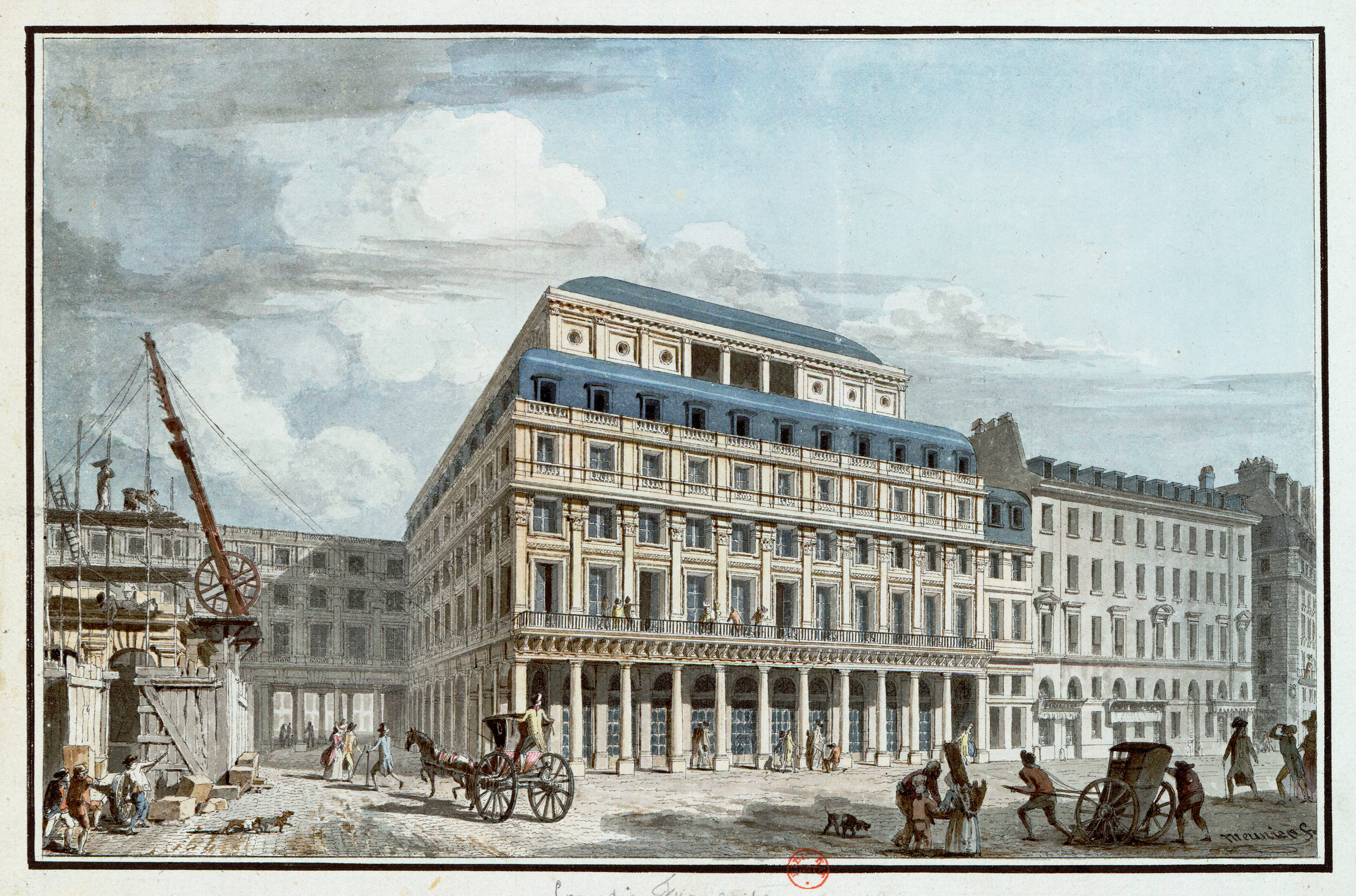
The Salle Richelieu, designed and constructed 1786–1790 by Victor Louis, became the theatre of the Comédie-Française in 1799.

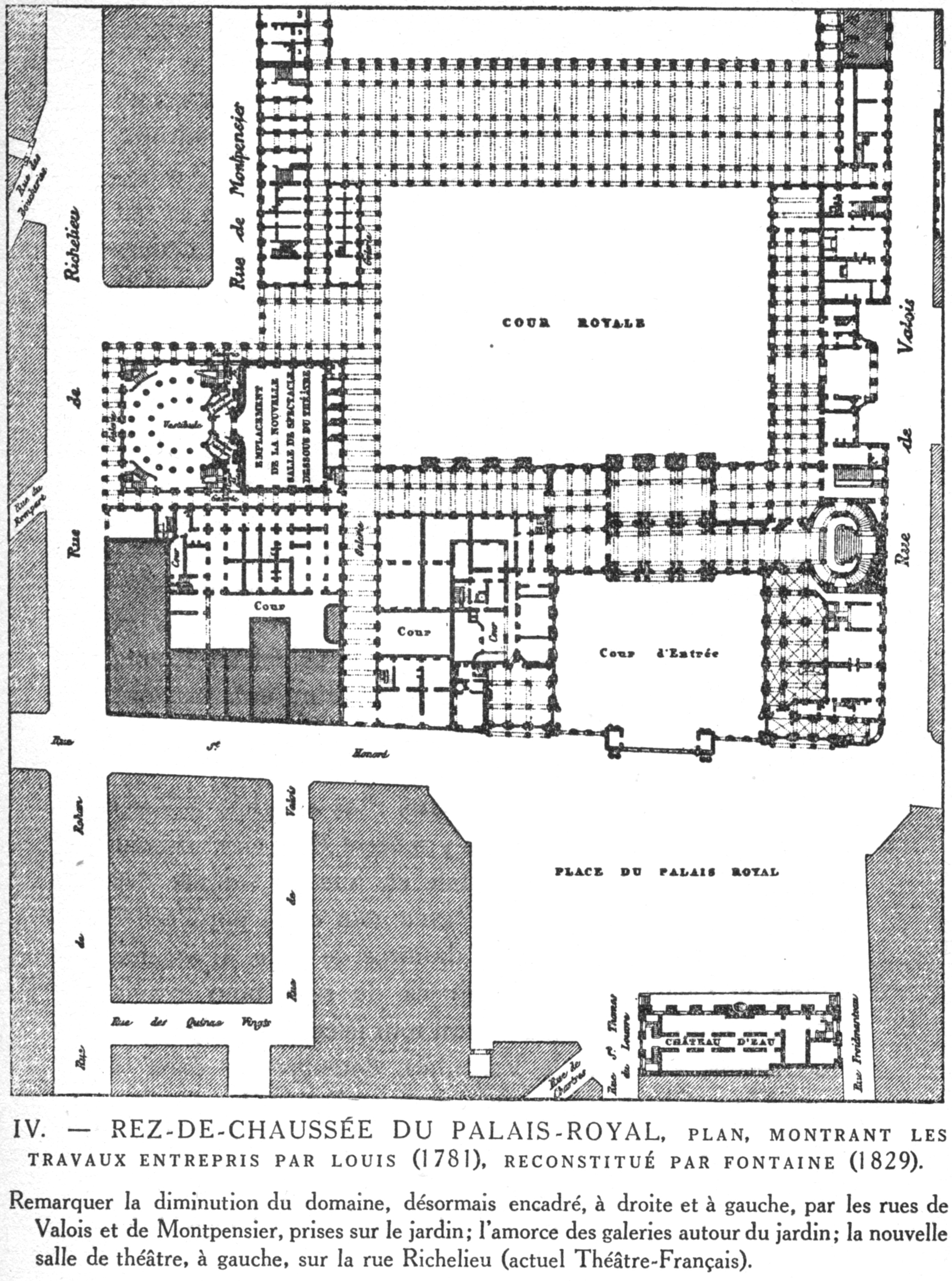
Palais-Royal (c. 1790) with Victor Louis' second theatre on the left and the rue de Valois replacing Moreau's opera on the right

Louis Philippe II's second theatre was larger and located near the southwest corner of the complex, on the rue de Richelieu. He originally intended it for the Opera, but that company refused to move into it. Instead he offered it to the Théâtre des Variétés-Amusantes, formerly on the boulevard du Temple but since 1 January 1785 playing in a temporary theatre in the gardens of the Palais-Royal. This company changed its name to Théâtre du Palais-Royal on 15 December 1789, and later moved into the new theatre upon its completion, where they opened on 15 May 1790. On 25 April 1791 the anti-royalist faction of the Comédie-Française, led by Talma, left that company's theatre on the left bank (at that time known as the Théâtre de la Nation, but today as the Odéon), and joined the company on the rue de Richelieu, which promptly changed its name to Théâtre Français de la rue de Richelieu. With the founding of the French Republic in September 1792 the theatre's name was changed again, to Théâtre de la République. In 1799 the players of the split company reunited at the Palais-Royal, and the theatre officially became the Comédie-Française, also commonly known as the Théâtre-Français, names which it retains to this day.

==== Shopping arcades ====
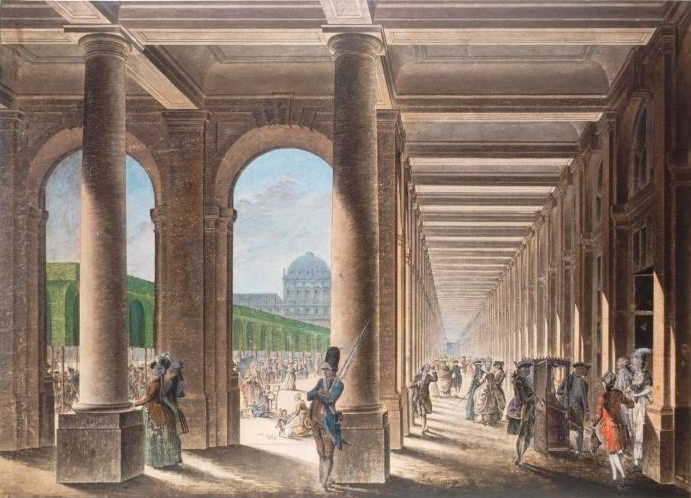
Galerie de Montpensier in the 18th century

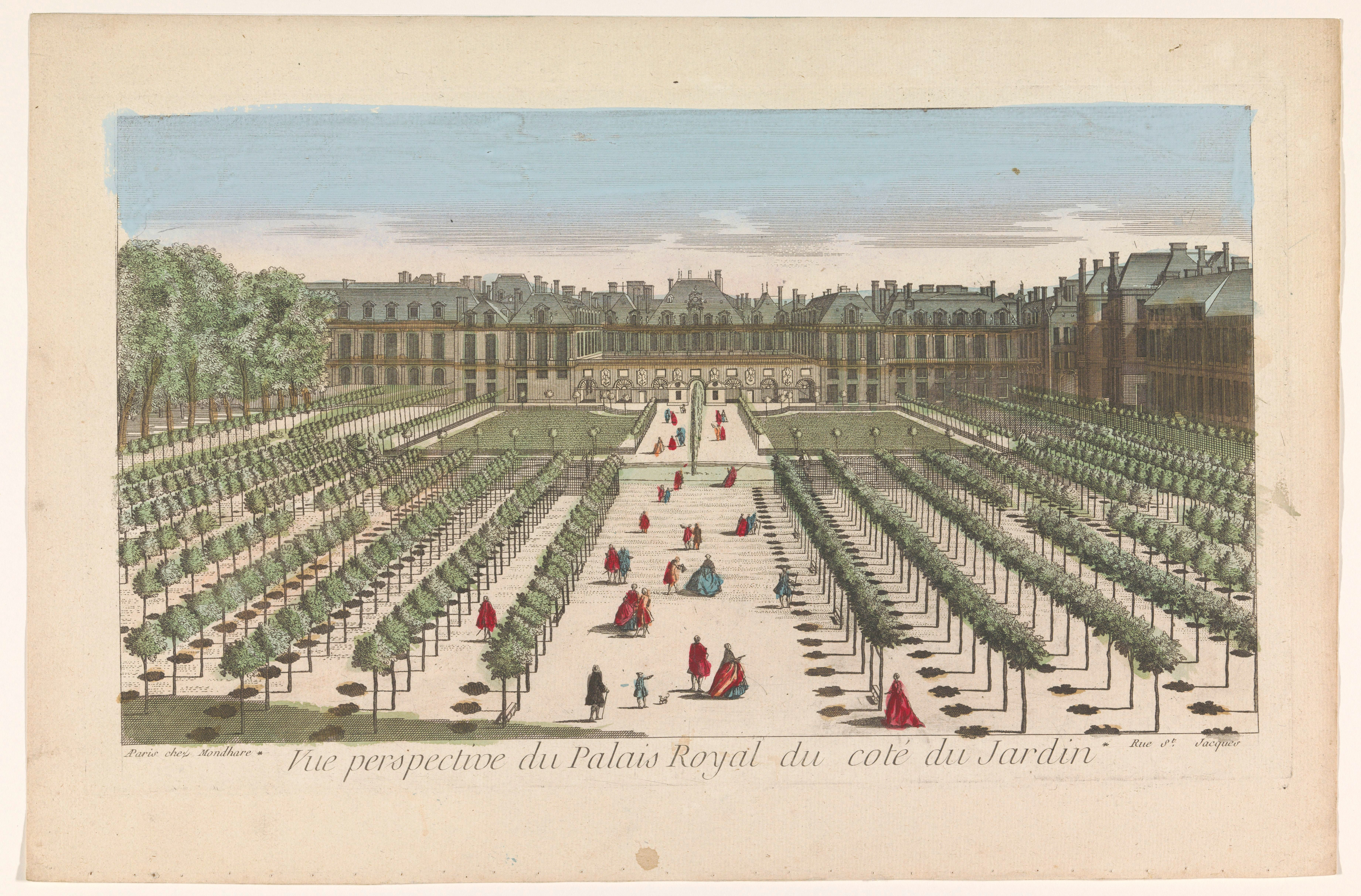
Perspective view of the royal palace from the garden side

Louis Philippe II also had Victor Louis build six-story apartment buildings with ground-floor colonnades facing the three sides of the palace garden between 1781 and 1784. On the outside of these wings three new streets were constructed in front of the houses that had formerly overlooked the garden: the rue de Montpensier on the west, rue de Beaujolais to the north, and rue de Valois on the east. He commercialised the new complex by letting out the area under the colonnades to retailers and service-providers and in 1784 the shopping and entertainment complex opened to the public. Over a decade or so, sections of the Palais were transformed into shopping arcades that became the centre of 18th-century Parisian economic and social life.

Though the main part of the palace (corps de logis) remained the private Orléans seat, the arcades surrounding its public gardens had 145 boutiques, cafés, salons, hair salons, bookshops, museums, and countless refreshment kiosks. These retail outlets sold luxury goods such as fine jewelry, furs, paintings and furniture to the wealthy elite. Stores were fitted with long glass windows which allowed the emerging middle-classes to window shop and indulge in fantasies. Thus, the Palais-Royal became one of the first of the new style of shopping arcades and became a popular venue for the wealthy to congregate, socialise and enjoy their leisure time. The redesigned palace complex became one of the most important marketplaces in Paris. It was frequented by the aristocracy, the middle classes, and the lower orders. It had a reputation as being a site of sophisticated conversation (revolving around the salons, cafés, and bookshops), shameless debauchery (it was a favorite haunt of local prostitutes), as well as a hotbed of Freemasonic activity.

Designed to attract the genteel middle class, the Palais-Royal sold luxury goods at relatively high prices. However, prices were never a deterrent, as these new arcades came to be the place to shop and to be seen. Arcades offered shoppers the promise of an enclosed space away from the chaos that characterised the noisy, dirty streets; a warm, dry space away from the elements; and a safe-haven where people could socialise and spend their leisure time. Promenading in the arcades became a popular eighteenth century pastime for the emerging middle classes.

From the 1780s to 1837, the palace was once again the centre of Parisian political and social intrigue and the site of the most popular cafés. The historic restaurant "Le Grand Véfour", which opened in 1784, is still there. In 1786, a noon cannon was set up by a philosophical amateur, set on the Paris meridian, in which the sun's noon rays, passing through a lens, lit the cannon's fuse. The noon cannon is still fired at the Palais-Royal, though most of the ladies for sale have disappeared, those who inspired the Abbé Delille's lines:

Dans ce jardin on ne rencontre
Ni prés, ni bois, ni fruits, ni fleurs.
Et si l'on y dérègle ses mœurs,
Au moins on y règle sa montre.

("In this garden one encounters neither meadows, nor woods, nor fruits, nor flowers. And, if one upsets one's morality, at least one may reset one's watch.")

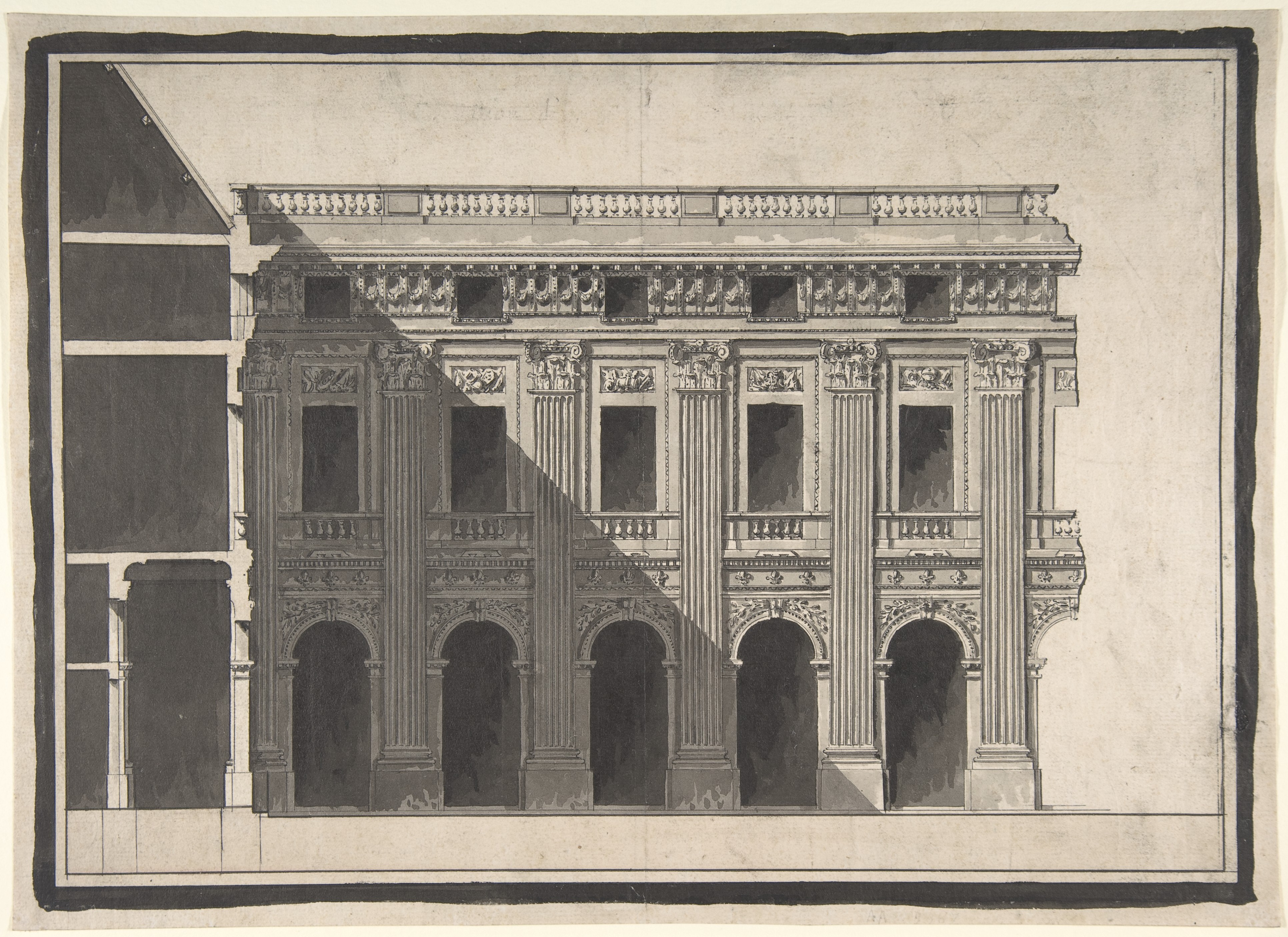
Design of 1781 by Victor Louis for the garden façade

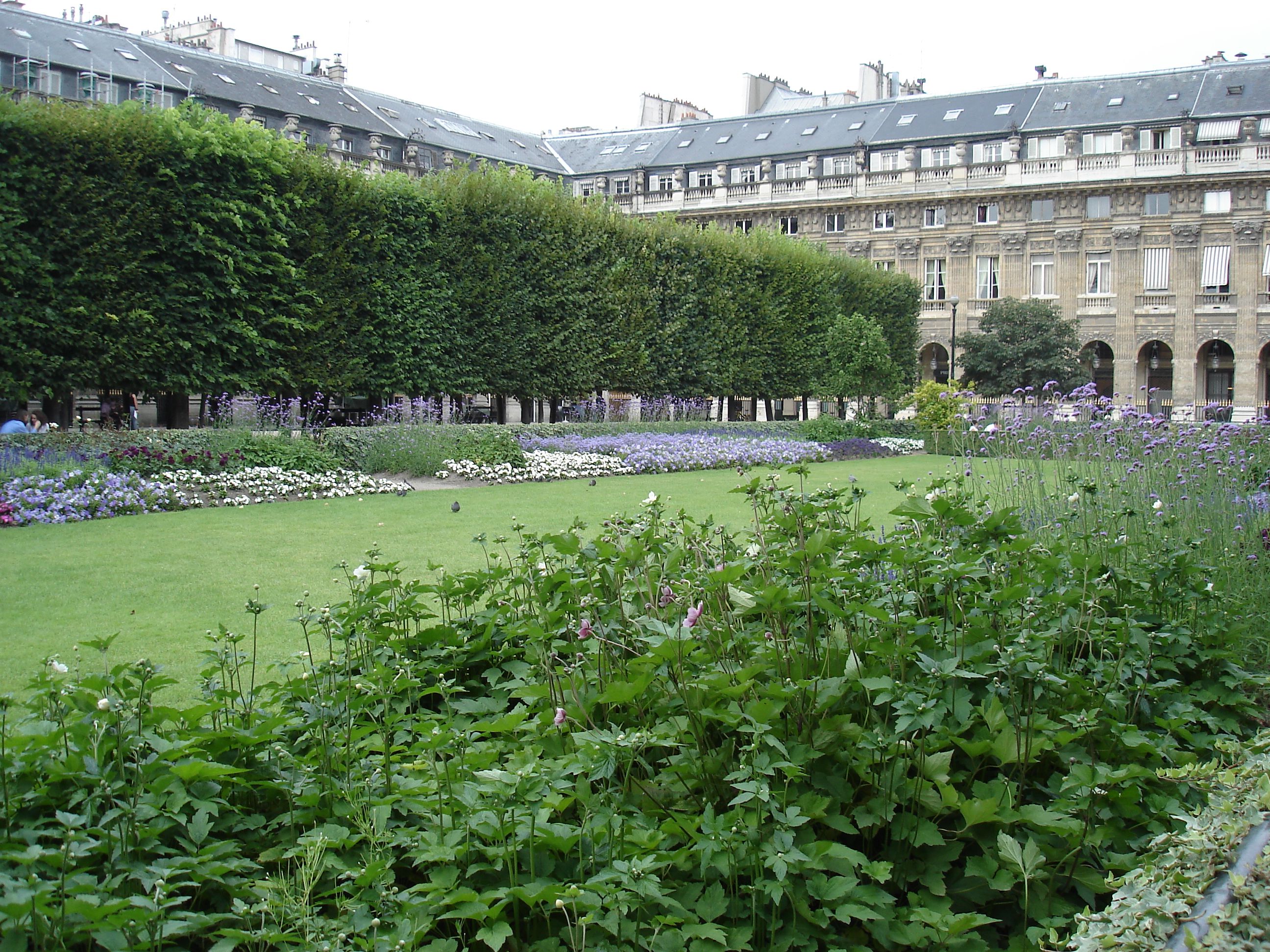
The garden surrounded by the arcades in 2005

The Cirque du Palais-Royal, constructed in the center of the garden, has been described as "a huge half-subterranean spectacle space of food, entertainments, boutiques, and gaming that ran the length of the park and was the talk of the capital." It was destroyed by fire on 15 December 1798.

Inspired by the souks of Arabia, the Galerie de bois, a series of wooden shops linking the ends of the Palais-Royal and enclosing the south end of the garden, was first opened in 1786. For Parisians, who lived in the virtual absence of pavements, the streets were dangerous and dirty; the arcade was a welcome addition to the streetscape as it afforded a safe place where Parisians could window shop and socialise. Thus, the Palais-Royal began what architectural historian Bertrand Lemoine describes as "l’Ère des passages couverts" (the Arcade Era), which transformed European shopping habits between 1786 and 1935.

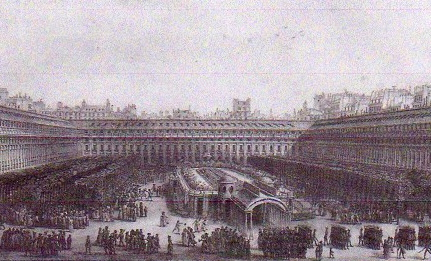
View of the Palais-Royal garden looking north in 1788 with the Cirque du Palais-Royal in the center

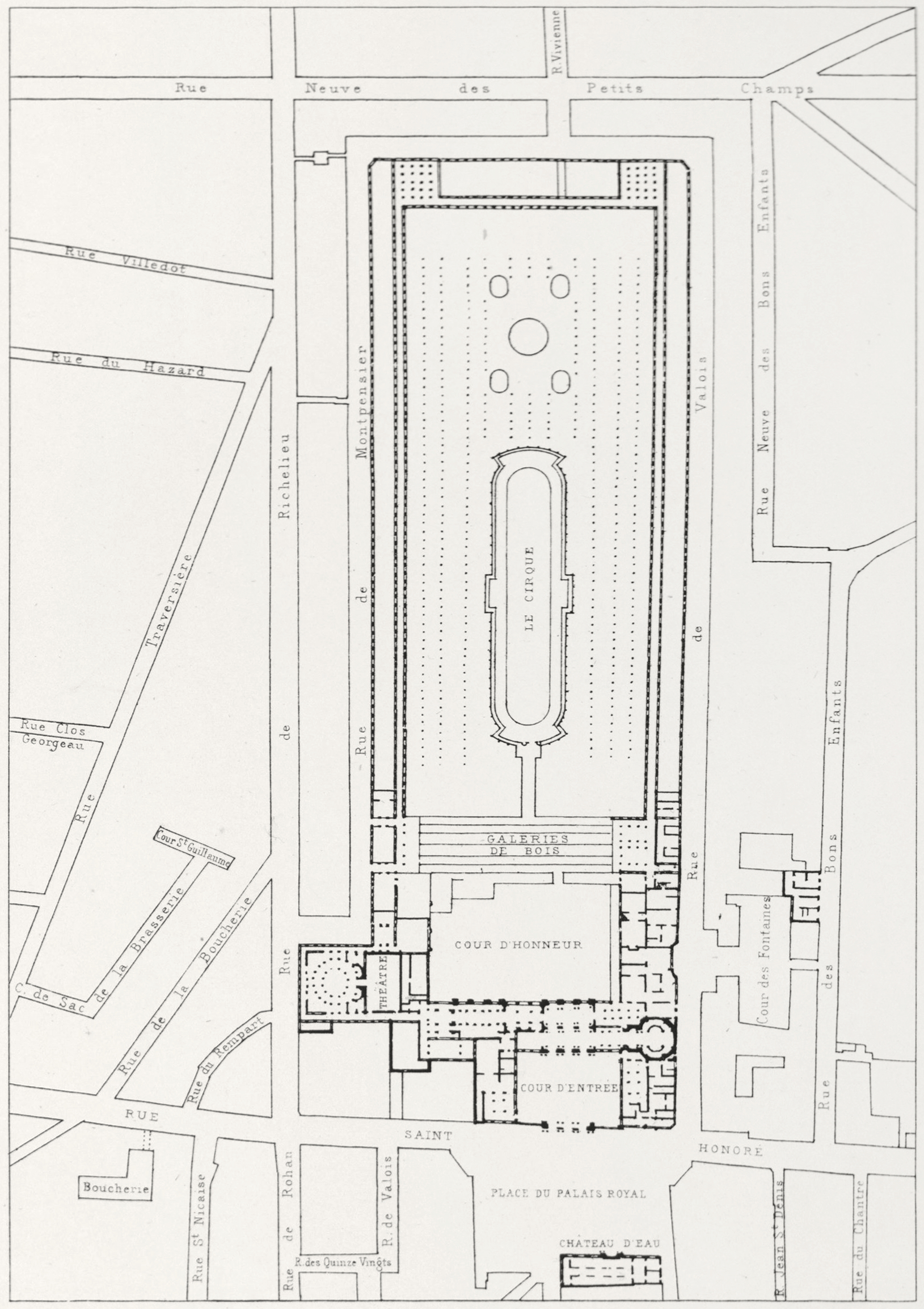
Plan of the Palais-Royal in 1795

=== Palais de l'Égalité and the Revolution ===
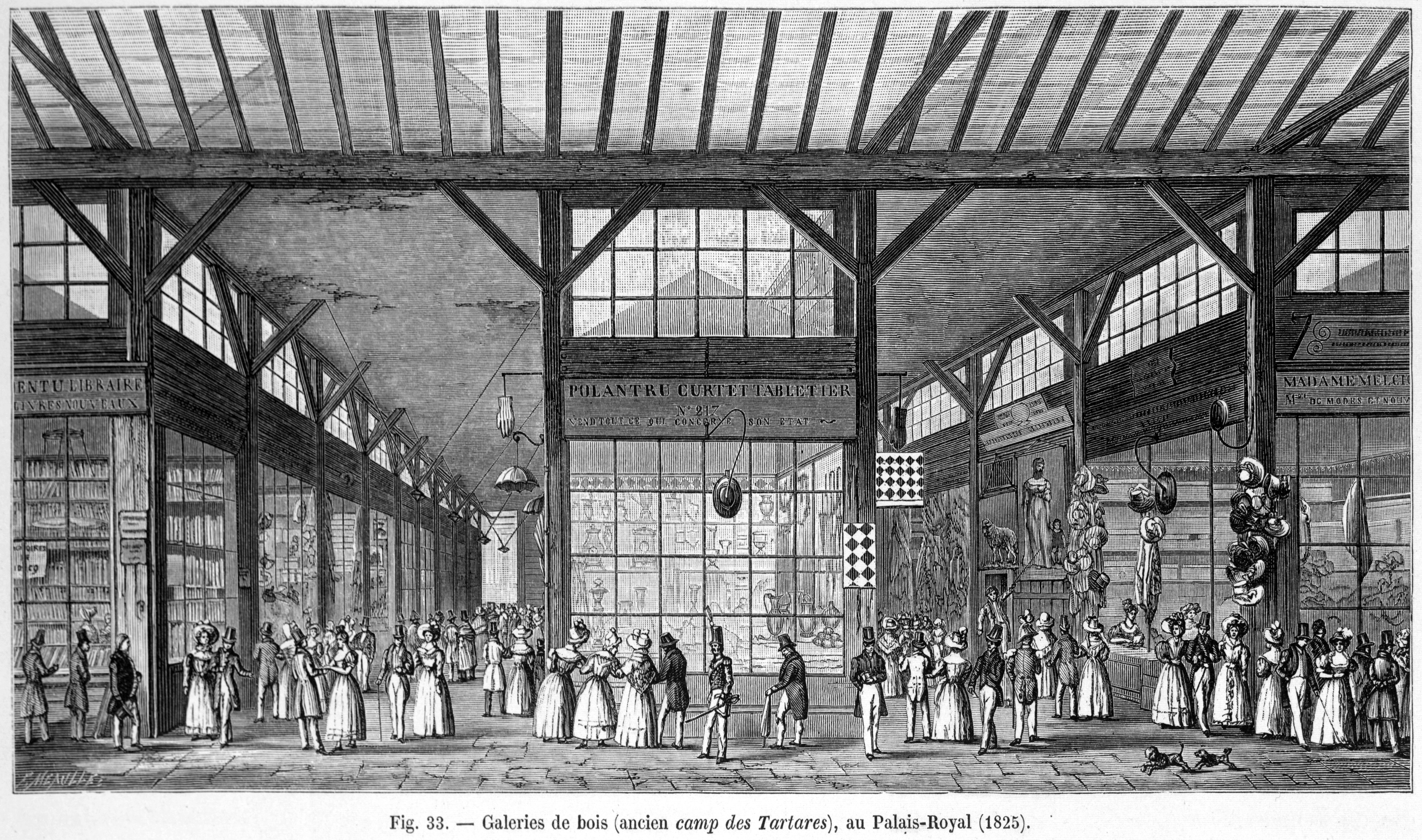
Galeries de bois at the Palais-Royal, by Theodor Josef Hubert Hoffbauer, lithograph, c. 1825

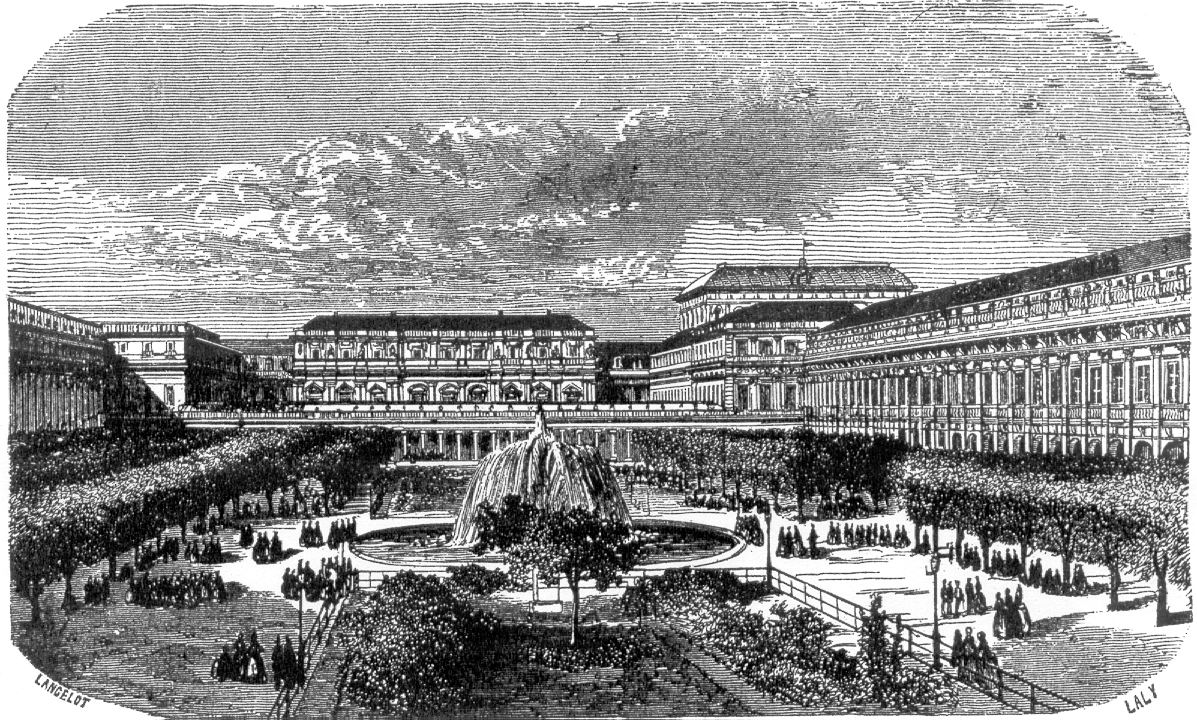
Palais-Royal Gardens: Illustration from an 1863 guide to Paris. Modern planting maintains the lawn, fountains, and trees.

During the revolutionary period, Philippe d'Orléans became known as Philippe Égalité, and renamed the palace to Palais d'l'Égalité. He had made himself popular in Paris when he opened the gardens of the palace to all Parisians. In one of the shops around the garden Charlotte Corday bought the knife she used to stab Jean-Paul Marat. Along the galeries, ladies of the night lingered, and smart gambling casinos were lodged in second-floor quarters.

The Marquis de Sade referred to the grounds in front of the palace in his Philosophy in the Bedroom (1795) as a place where progressive pamphlets were sold.

Upon the execution of the Duke, the palace's ownership lapsed to the state, whence it was called Palais du Tribunat. The Comédie-Française, the state theatre company, was reorganised by Napoleon in the décret de Moscou on 15 October 1812, which contains 87 articles.

=== Bourbon restoration to Second Empire ===
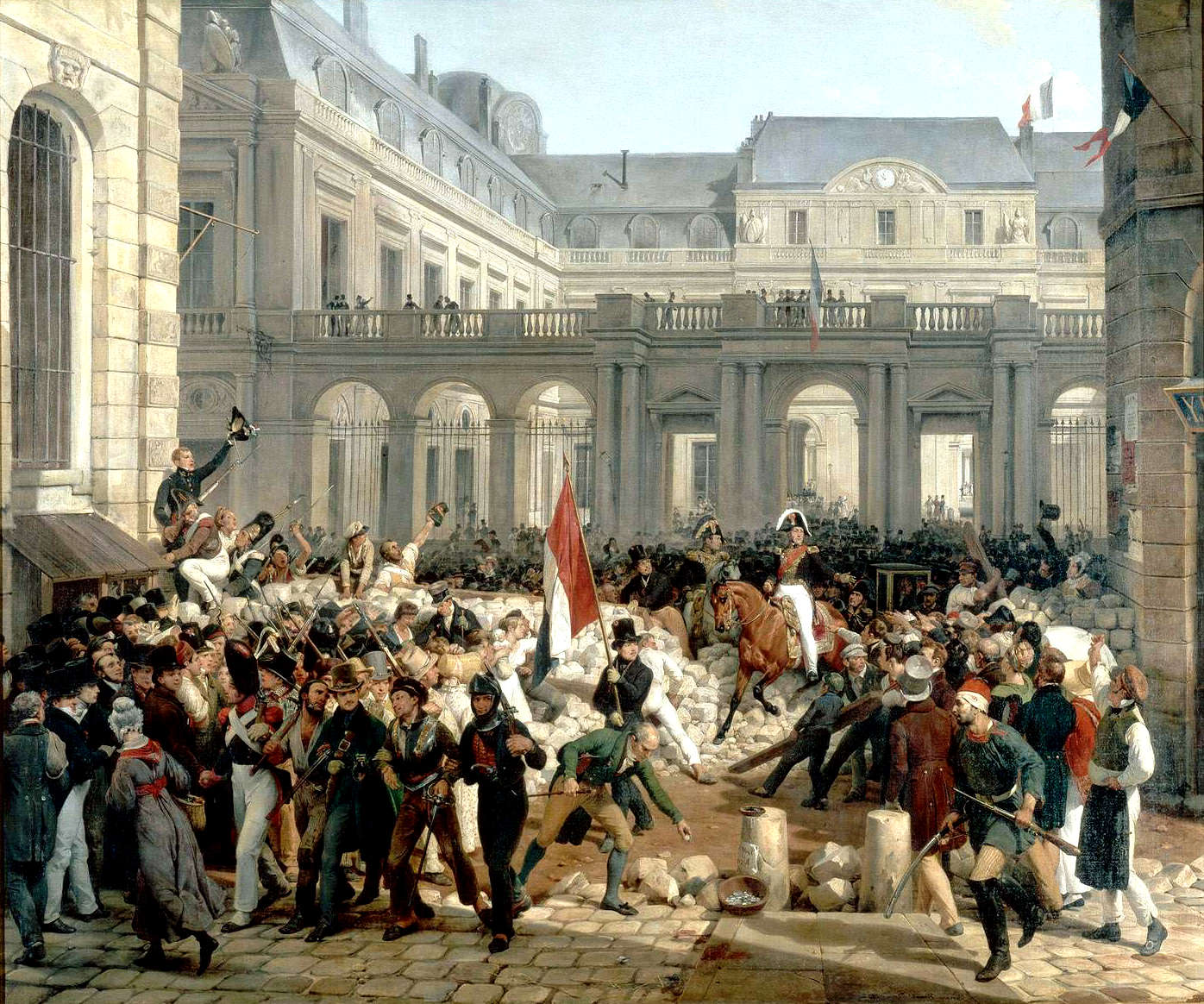
The Duke of Orleans Leaving the Palais-Royal by Horace Vernet. Duke of Orléans leaving the Palais-Royal to go to the city hall, 31 July 1830, two days after the July Revolution

After the Restoration of the Bourbons, at the Palais-Royal the young Alexandre Dumas obtained employment in the office of the powerful Duke of Orléans, who regained control of the palace during the Restoration.

The Duke had Pierre-François-Léonard Fontaine draw up plans to complete work left unfinished by the Duke's father. Fontaine's most significant work included the western wing of the Cour d'Honneur, the Aile Montpensier, and with Charles Percier, what was probably the most famous of Paris's covered arcades, the Galerie d'Orléans, enclosing the Cour d'Honneur on its north side. Both were completed in 1830. The Galerie d'Orléans was demolished in the 1930s, but its flanking rows of columns still stand between the Cour d'Honneur and the Palais-Royal Garden.

Following the July Revolution of 1830 when the Duke of Orléans ascended the throne as Louis-Phillipe I, the palace remained the principal residence of the new monarch.

In the Revolution of 1848, a Paris mob attacked and looted the royal residence Palais-Royal, particularly the art collection of King Louis-Philippe. During the Second French Republic, the palace was briefly renamed the "Palais-National".

During the Second French Empire of Napoleon III, the Palais-Royal became home to the cadet branch of the Bonaparte family, represented by Prince Napoléon-Jérôme Bonaparte, Napoleon III's cousin. A lavish dining room was constructed in the Second Empire style, and is now known as the Salle Napoleon of the Council of State.

During the final days of Paris Commune, on May 24, 1871, the palace, seen as a symbol of aristocracy, was set afire by the Communards, but suffered less damage than other government buildings. As a result, it became the temporary (and later permanent) home of several state institutions, including the Conseil d'Etat, or State Council.

== The Palais-Royal today ==
Palais-Royal, Paris: 1. Ministère de la Culture - 2. Conseil constitutionnel - 3. Conseil d'État - 4. Comédie-Française - 5. Théâtre éphémère - 6. Colonnes de Buren - 7. Théâtre du Palais-Royal

Today, the Palais-Royal is the home of the Conseil d'État, the Constitutional Council, and the Ministry of Culture.

=== South façade ===
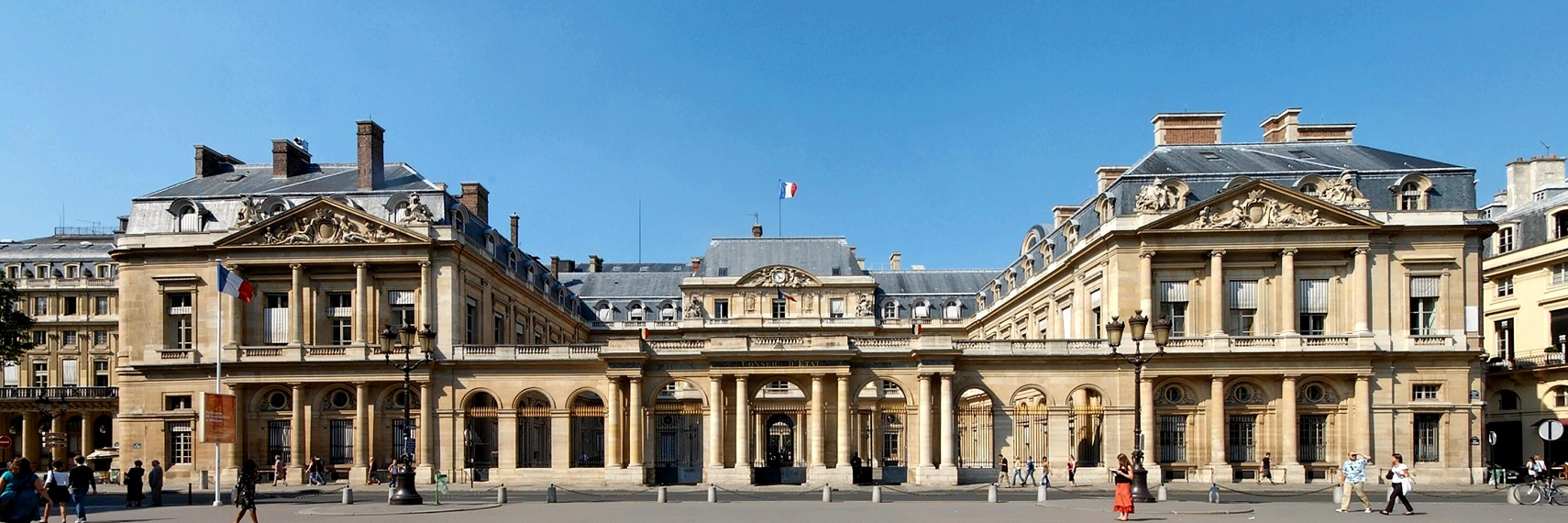
The south front of the Palais-Royal, with the Conseil d'Etat (Council of State) in the center

The buildings of the Palais-Royal face south to the Place du Palais-Royal and the Louvre across the Rue de Rivoli. The central part of the palace is occupied by the Conseil-d'État, or State Council. It has three floors, and is topped by a low cupola and a rounded pediment filled with sculpture. Two arched passages under the central building lead to the Courtyard of Honor behind. In the east wing, to the right, are offices of the Ministry of Culture and Communication. The two wings of the building have triangular fronts filled with sculpture, inspired by classical architecture and typical of the Louis XIV style.

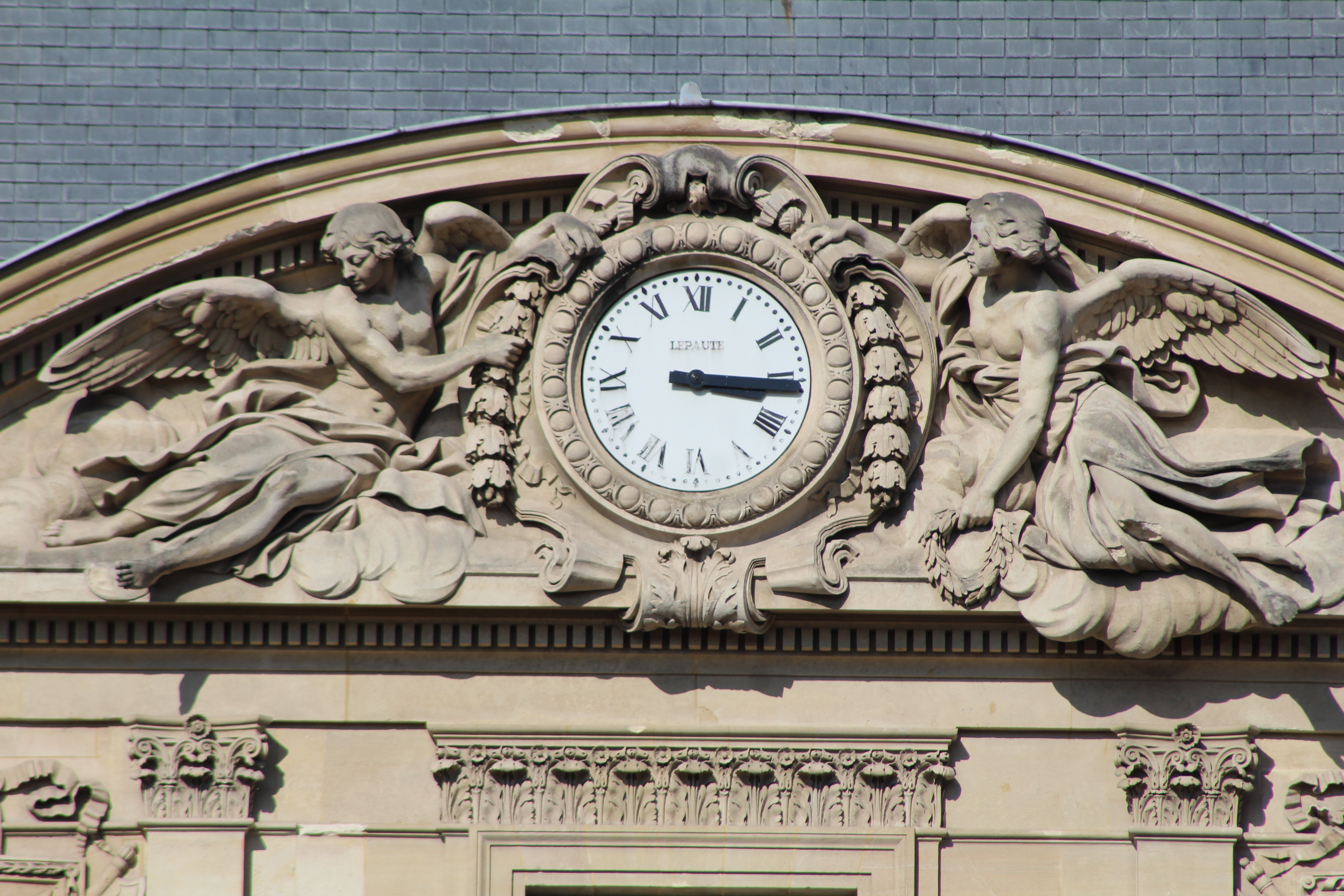
Sculpture of the Pediment of the Council of State

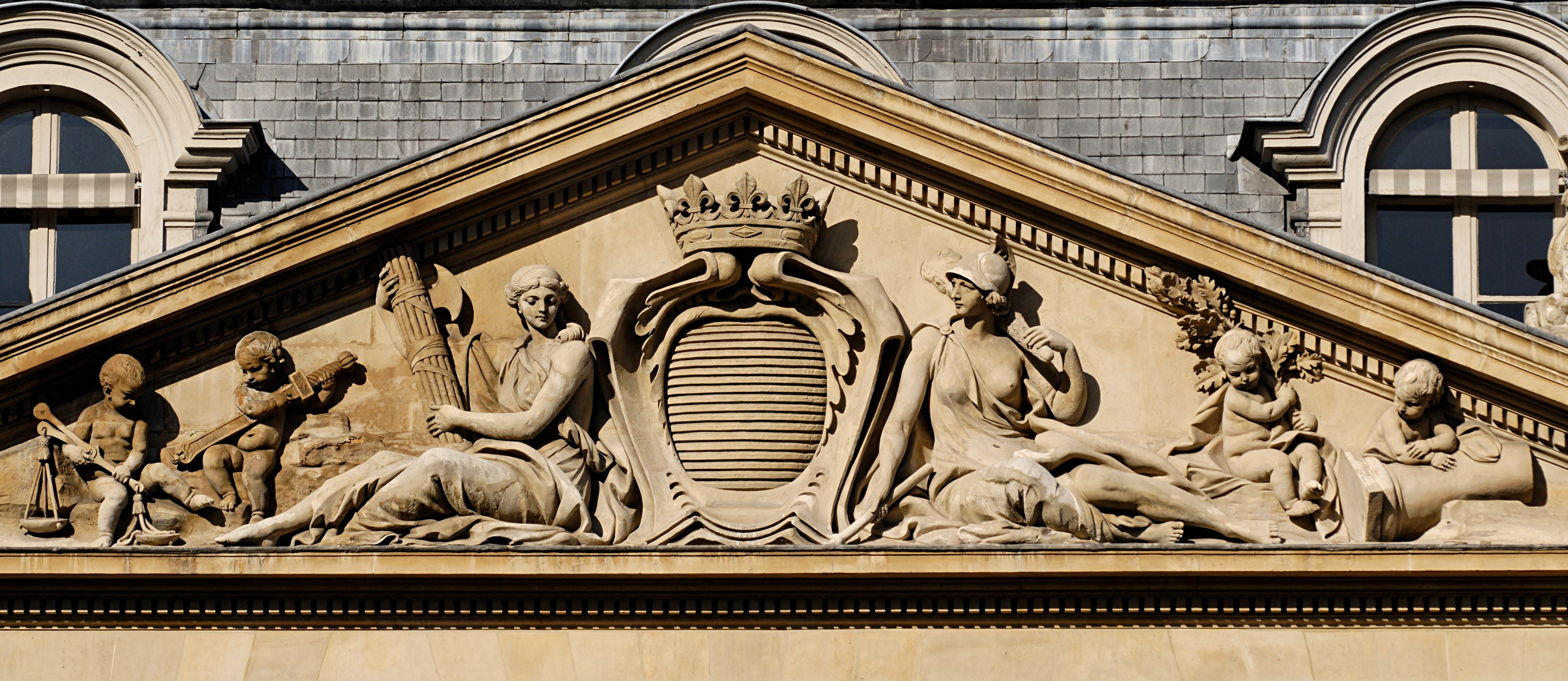
Sculpture of the south front, by Augustin Pajou

On the west side of the Council building is Place Colette, and the Salle Richelieu of the Comédie Française. Behind that are the offices of the Constitutional Council. On the left side of the Salle Richelieu is another small square, Place André Malraux.

=== Council of State ===
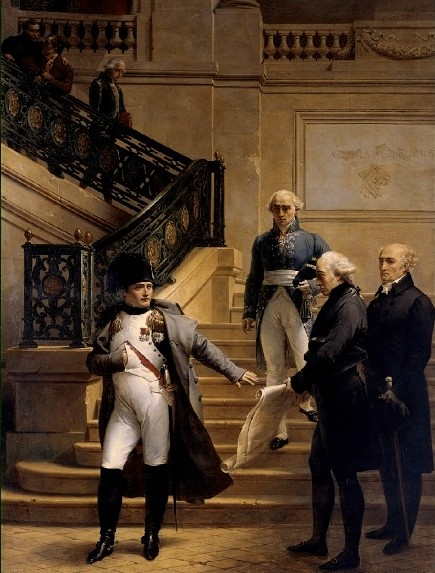
Napoleon on the Stairway of Honor (1807)

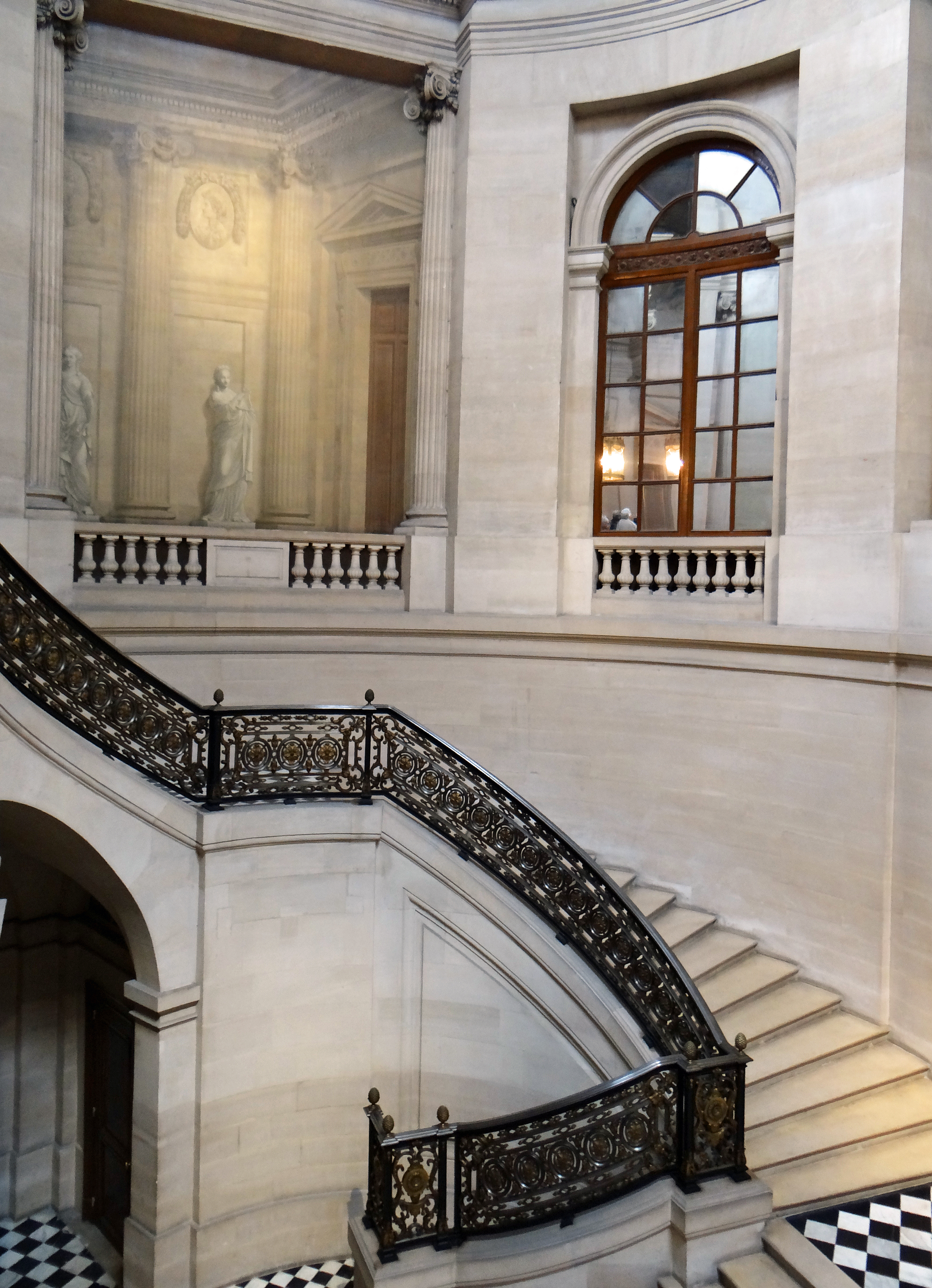
Stairway of Honor of the Conseil d'Etat, with trompe l'oeil painting of an arch and statue on first floor

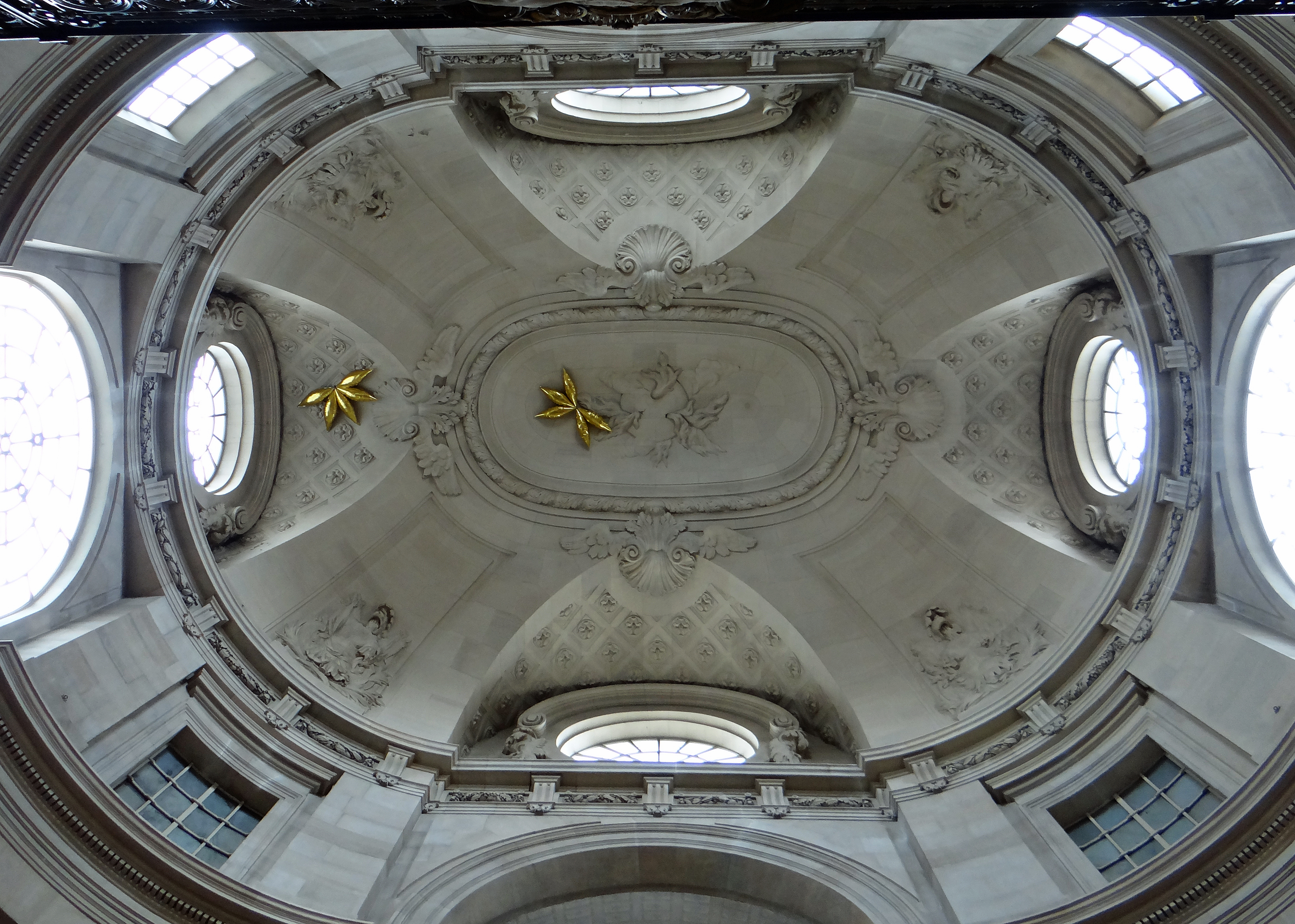
Dome over the Stairway of Honor with gilded bursting pomegranate emblems of Philippe d'Orléans

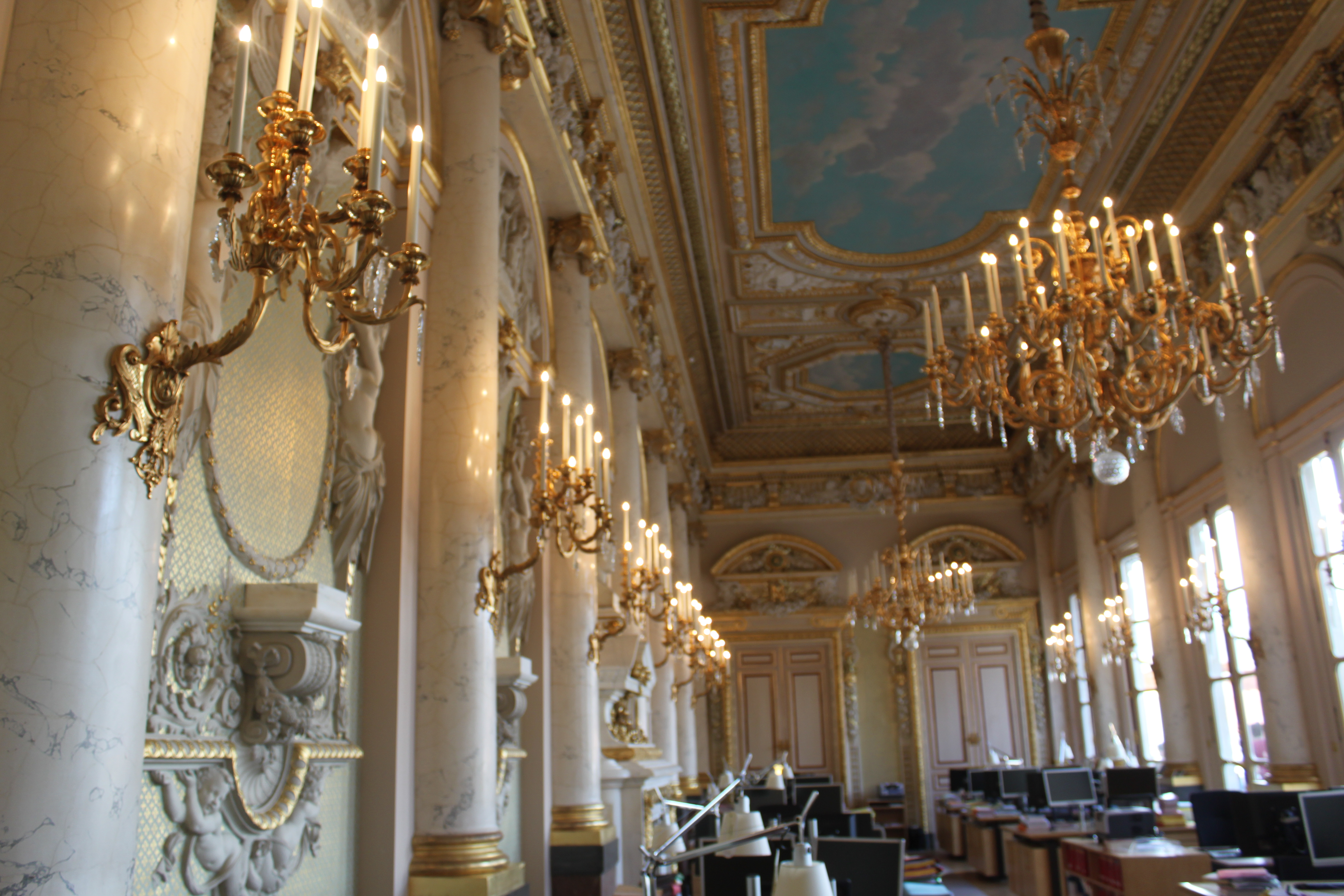
Salle Napoleon, decorated 1858-60 for Ministry of Colonies of Napoleon III

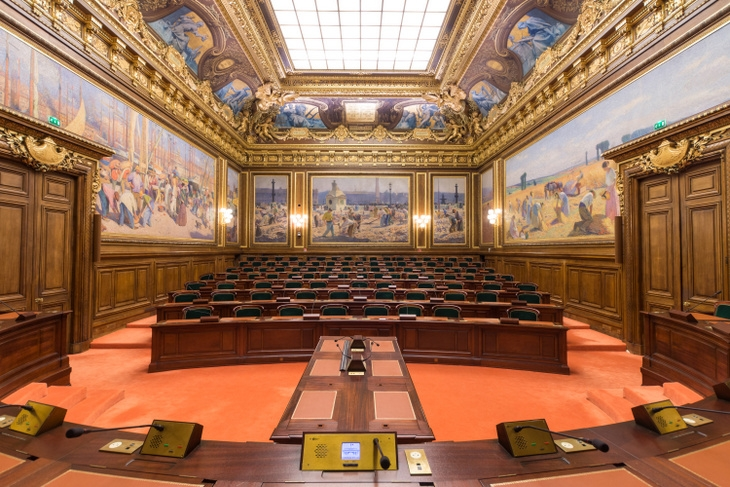
General Assembly Chamber of the Council of State

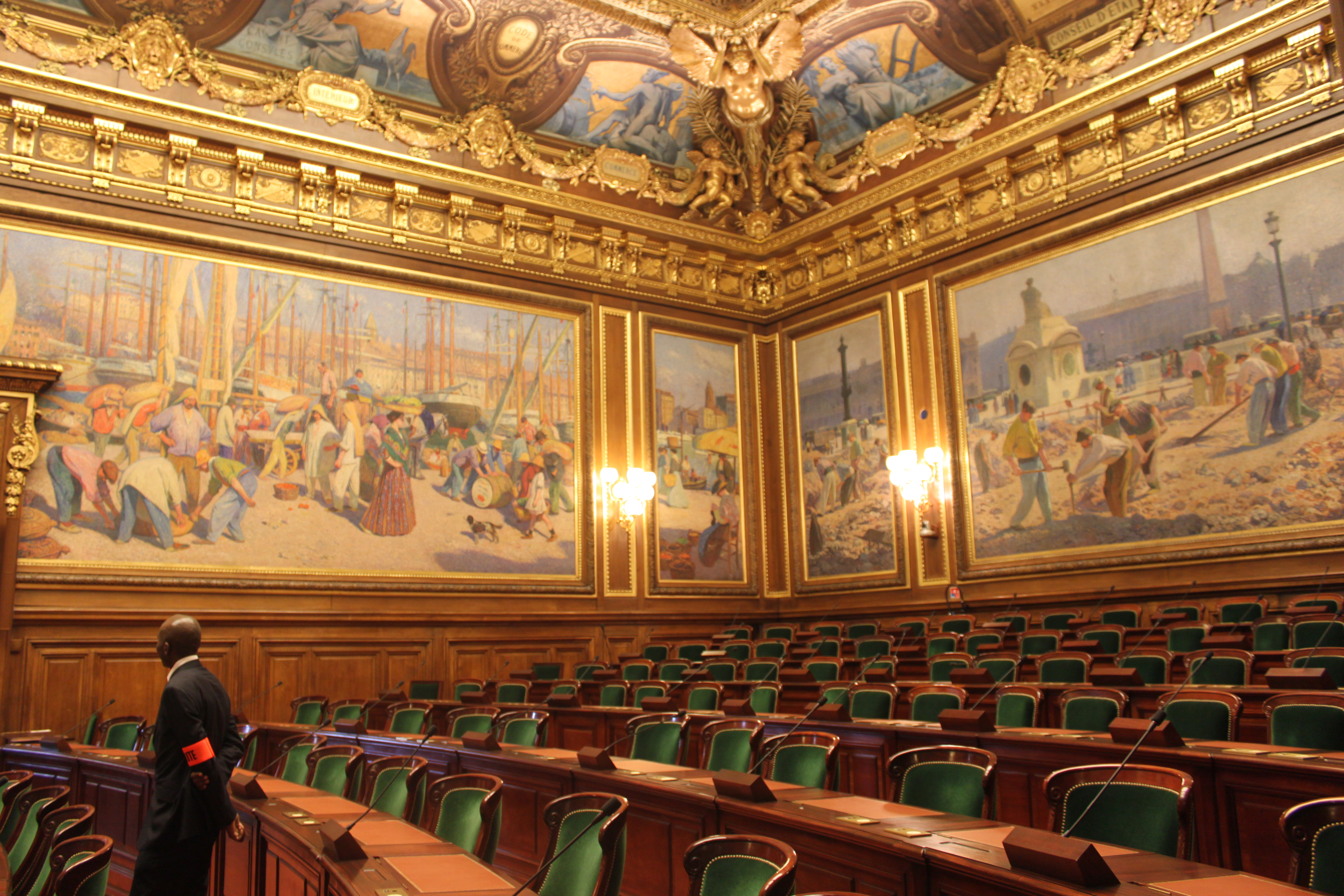
Murals of the General Assembly Chamber, depicting France at work

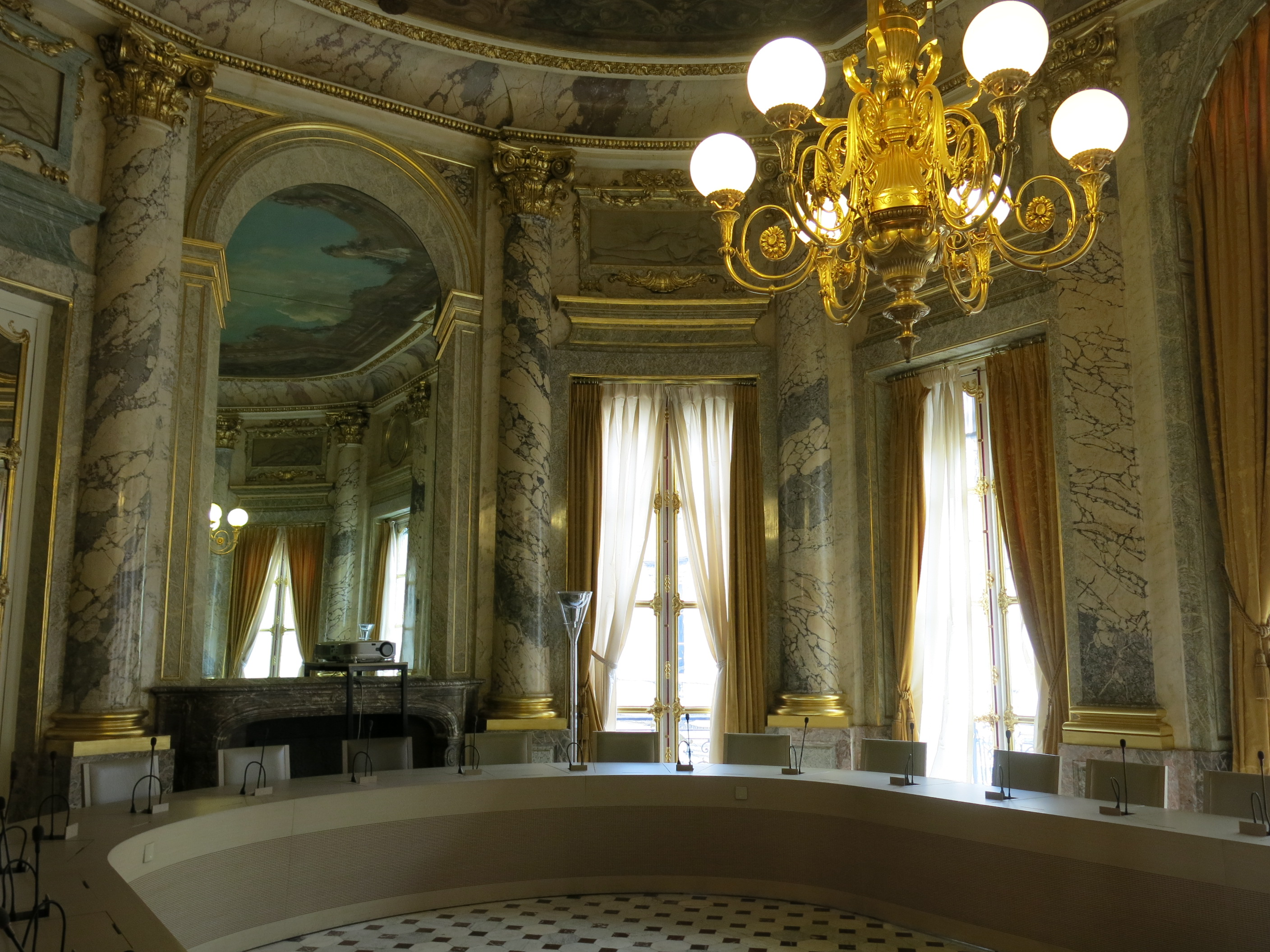
Tribunal of Conflicts of the Council of State

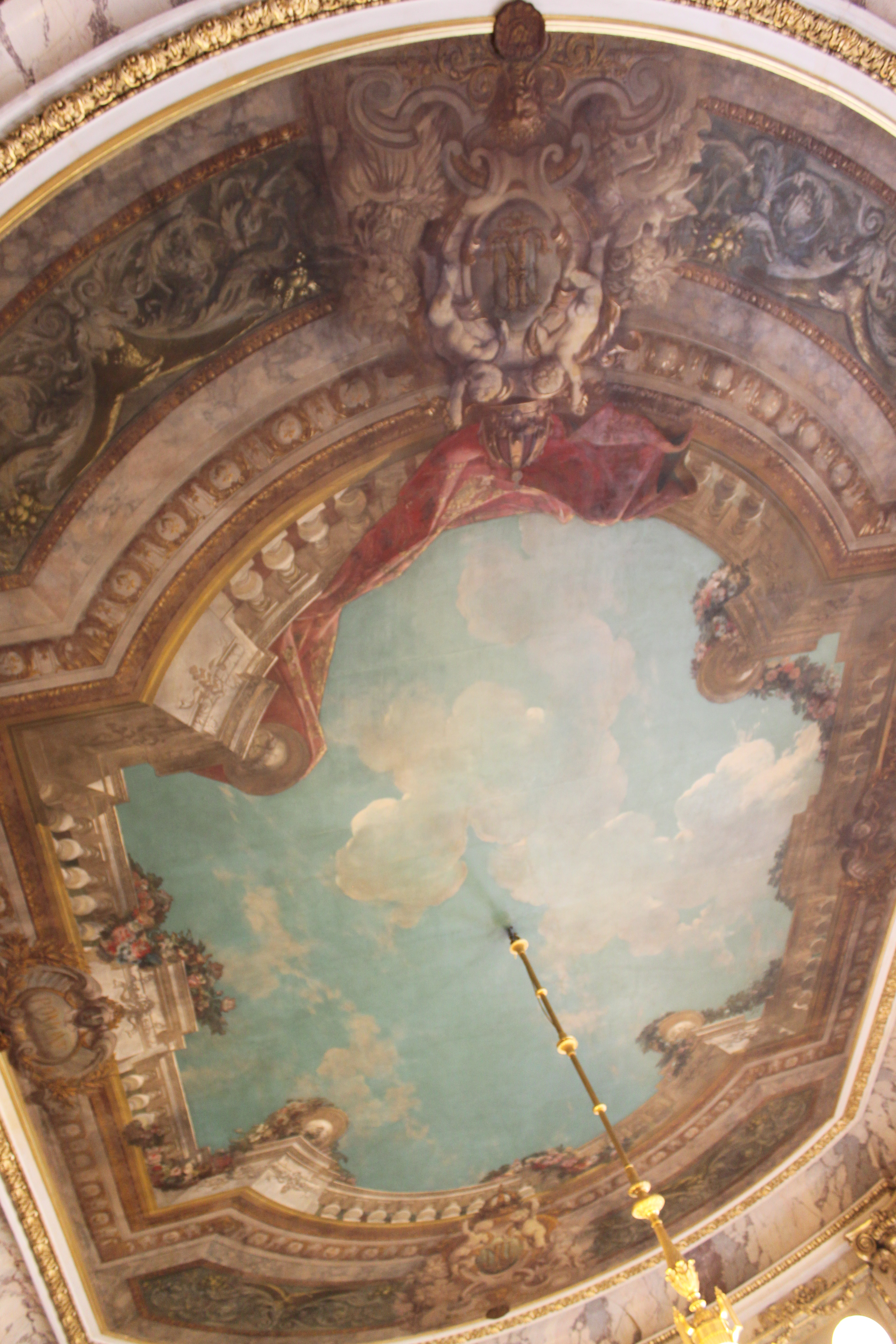
Trompe l'oeil ceiling of the Tribunal of Conflicts

The Council of State, created by Napoleon in 1799, inherited many of the functions of the earlier Royal Council, acting both as a consultant to the government and a kind of Supreme Court. It was installed in the Palais-Royal in 1875.

The Conseil has its own courtyard, facing out onto the Place du Palais-Royal and the Rue de Rivoli. Inside is the grand horseshoe stairway of honor, which curves upward along the walls to the landing on the first floor. It is decorated with theatrical effects, including ionic columns, and blind arches giving the illusion of bays. A trompe-l'oeil painting in an archway appears to give a view of a classical statue, above which putti hold wreathes around a bust of Cardinal Richelieu. The stairway was made by Pierre Contant d'Ivry in 1765.

The most lavish room of the Council is the Hall of the Tribunal of Conflicts, a kind of courtroom installed in the former dining room of Duchess of Orleans, built by the architect Pierre Contant d'Ivry in 1753. It still preserves much of its original decoration, with pilasters and columns, and decorative medallions of putti representing the four seasons and the four elements. The ceiling has a trompe l'oeil painting from 1852 depicting a balustrade and a view of the sky.

The General Assembly chamber was first a chapel, then, under Price Napoleon, a gallery of paintings. It has been changed more than any of the other rooms in the Council. At one end is a long table, with a seat in the center for the Vice President of the Assembly, who chairs the meetings, and the six presidents of the sections of Council. The decoration of the room is particularly rich and varied, with medallions and cameos and allegorical paintings illustrating the various codes of law and the administrative departments. Below these are four more recent large murals, installed between 1916 and 1926, on the theme of France at Work. They depict agriculture (workers in the fields), commerce (the Port of Marseilles), urban labor (Paris workers maintaining the Place de la Concorde), and intellectual labor.

=== Ministry of Culture ===
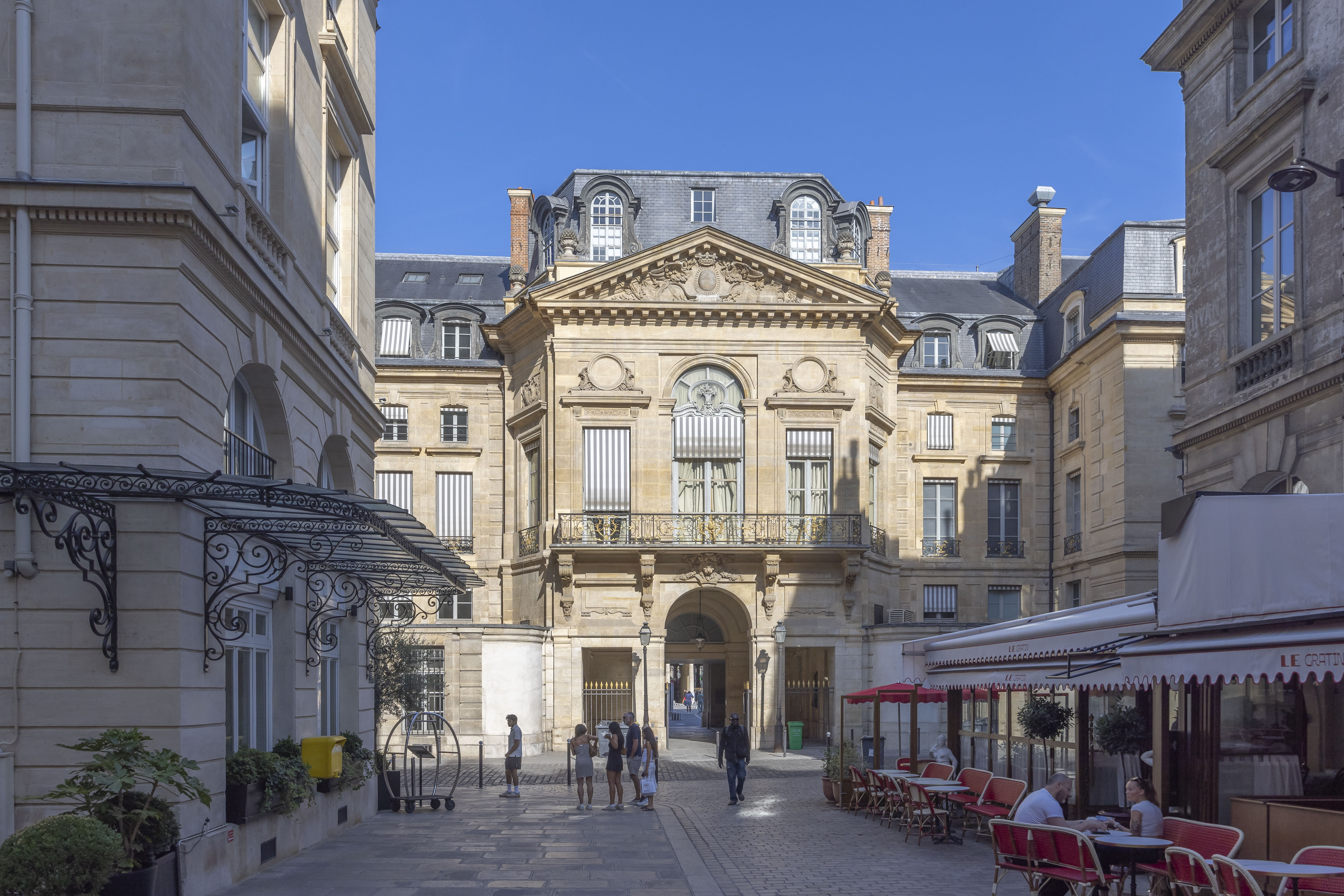
Facade of the eastern wing, occupied by the Ministry of Culture

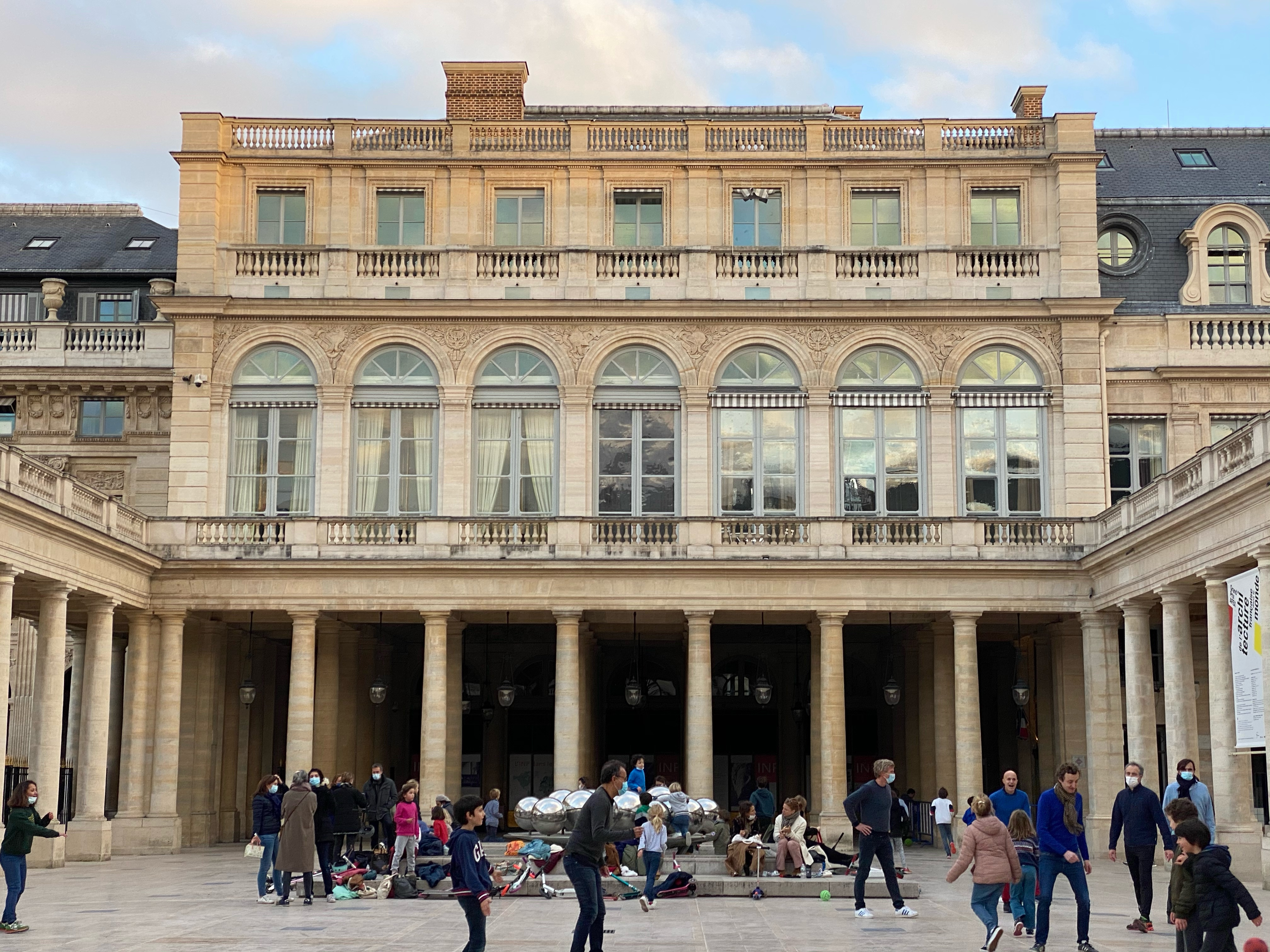
The wing, seen from the Gallery of Orleans

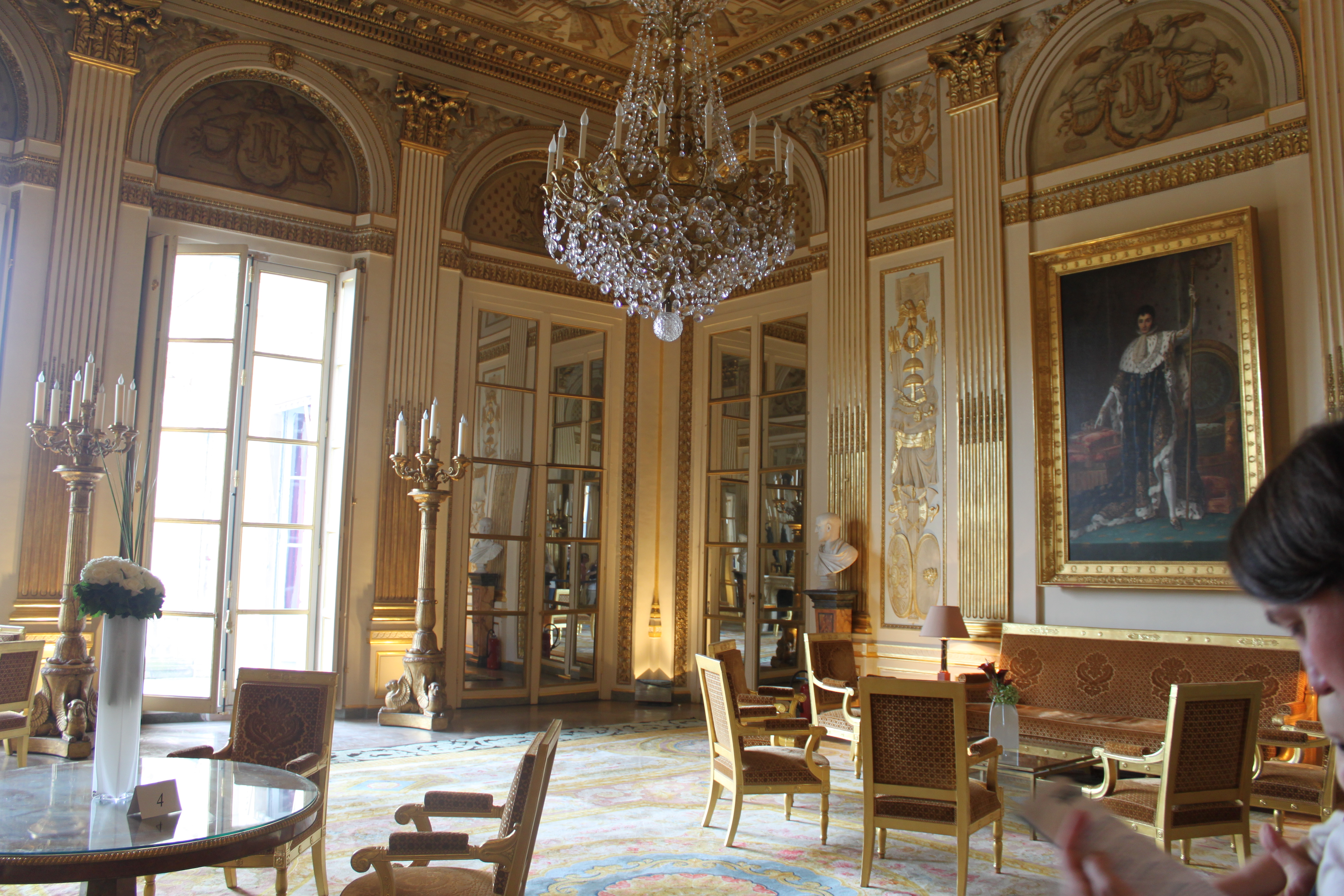
Salon Jerome of the Ministry of Culture. named after Napoleon's brother

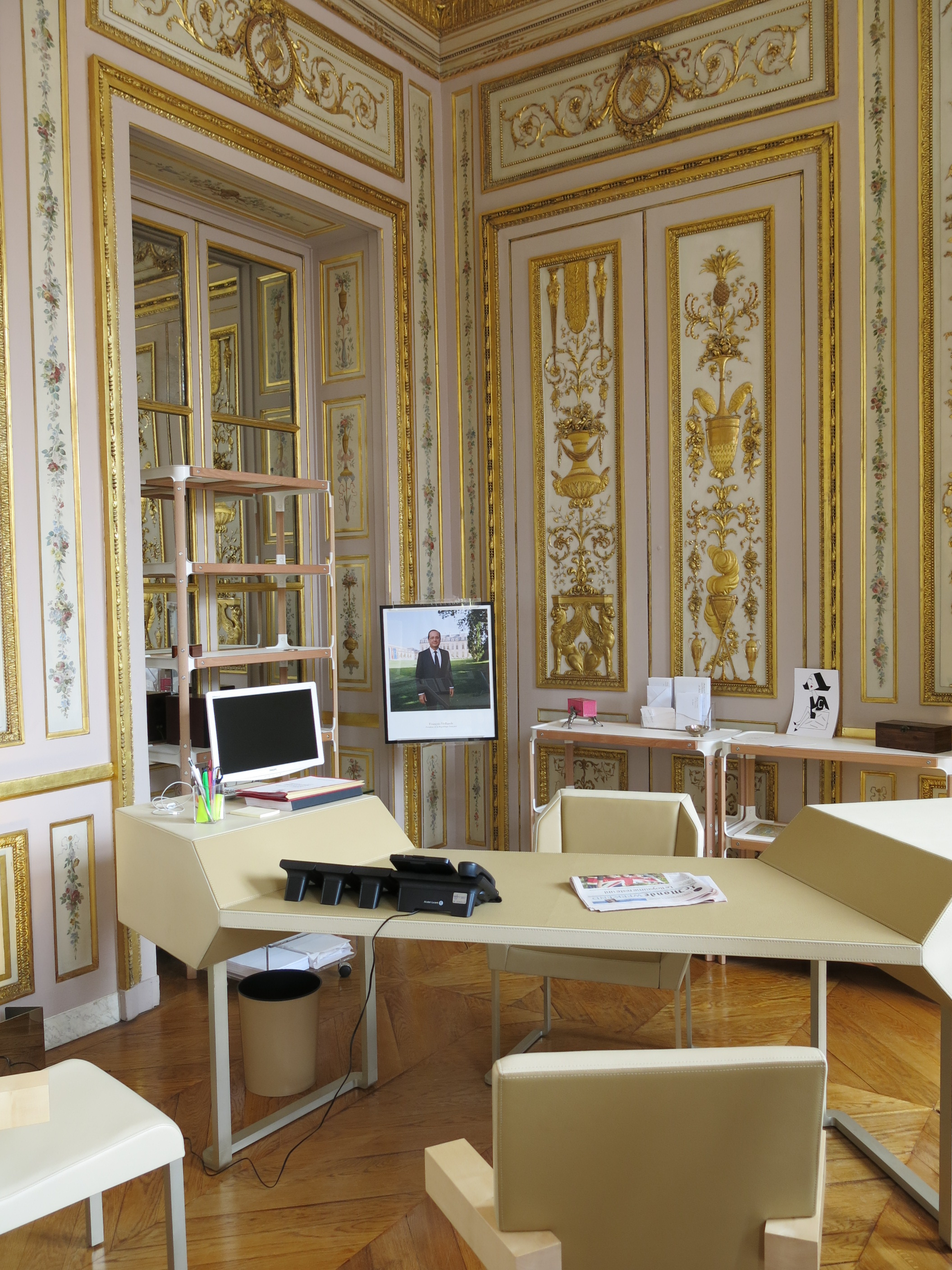
Office of the Minister of Culture

The office of the French Minister of Culture is located in the Palais-Royal, in an apartment originally built for the Duke and Duchess of Orleans in 1820, and later occupied by Jérôme Bonaparte in the 1850s. The gilded and highly decorated salon of Jérôme, the younger brother of Napoleon, features sculpture, torchieres and other decoration originally in the throne room of the Tuileries Palace.

=== Constitutional Council ===
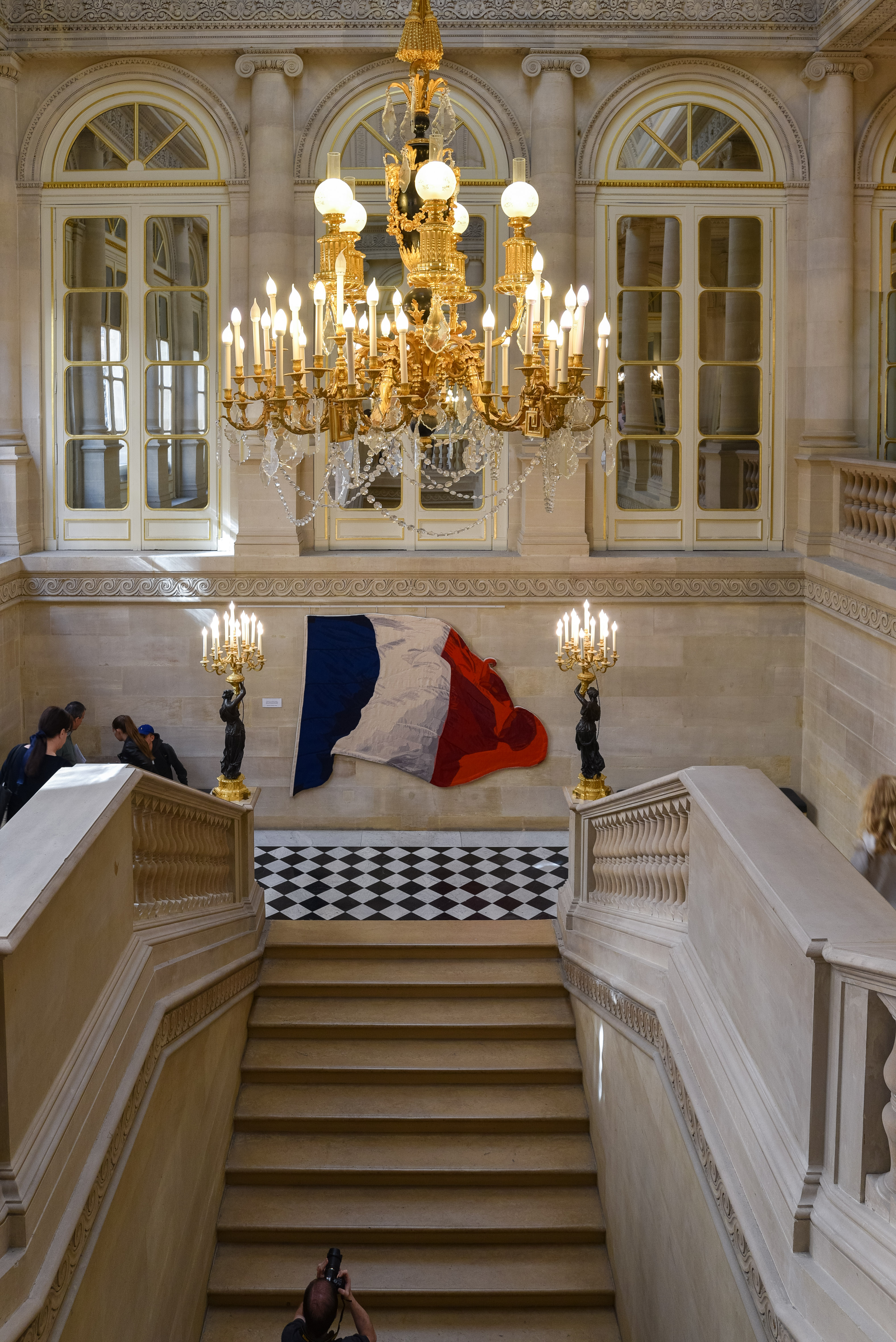
Stairway to the Constitutional Council

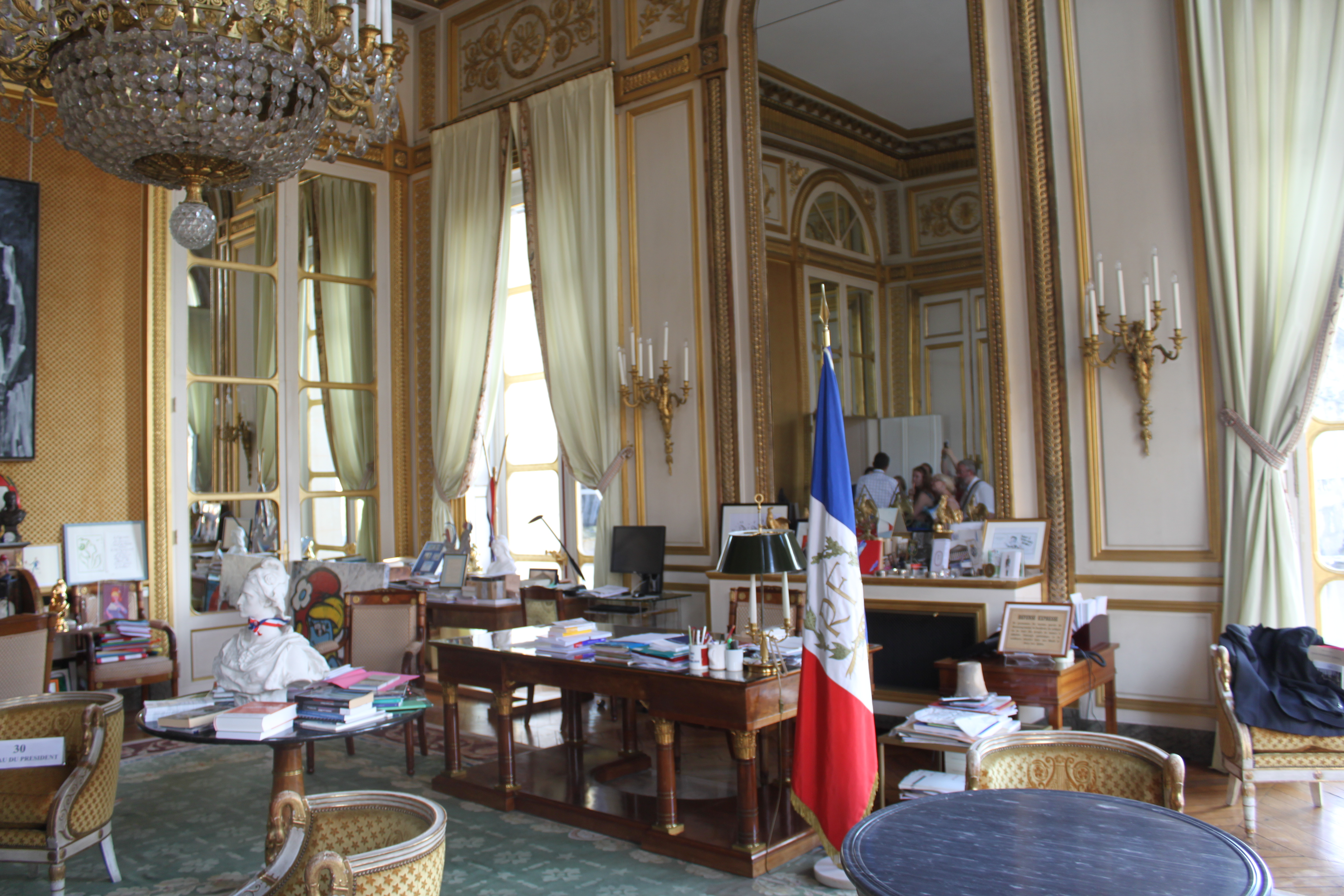
Office of the President of the Constitutional Council

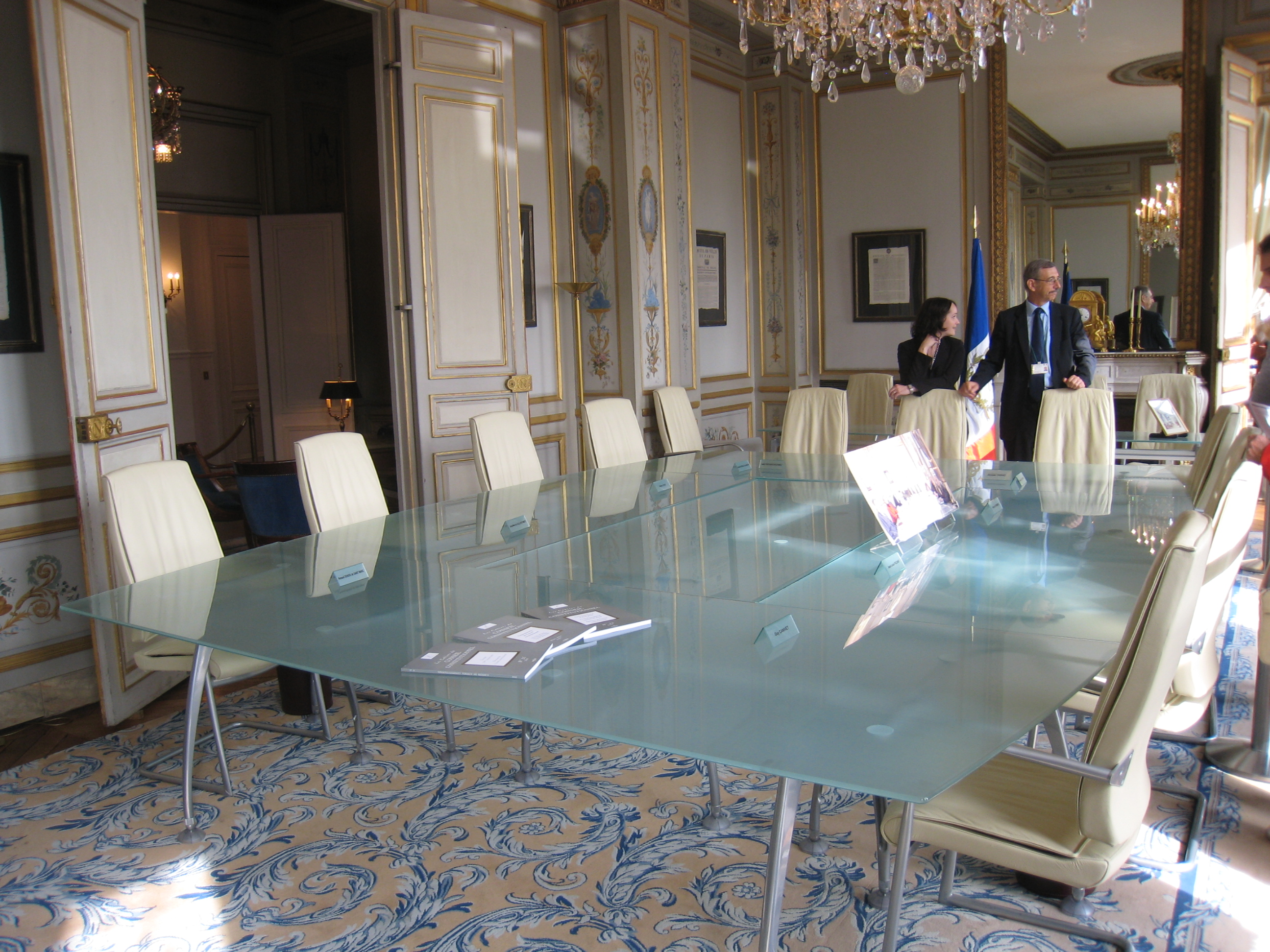
Meeting room of the Constitutional Council

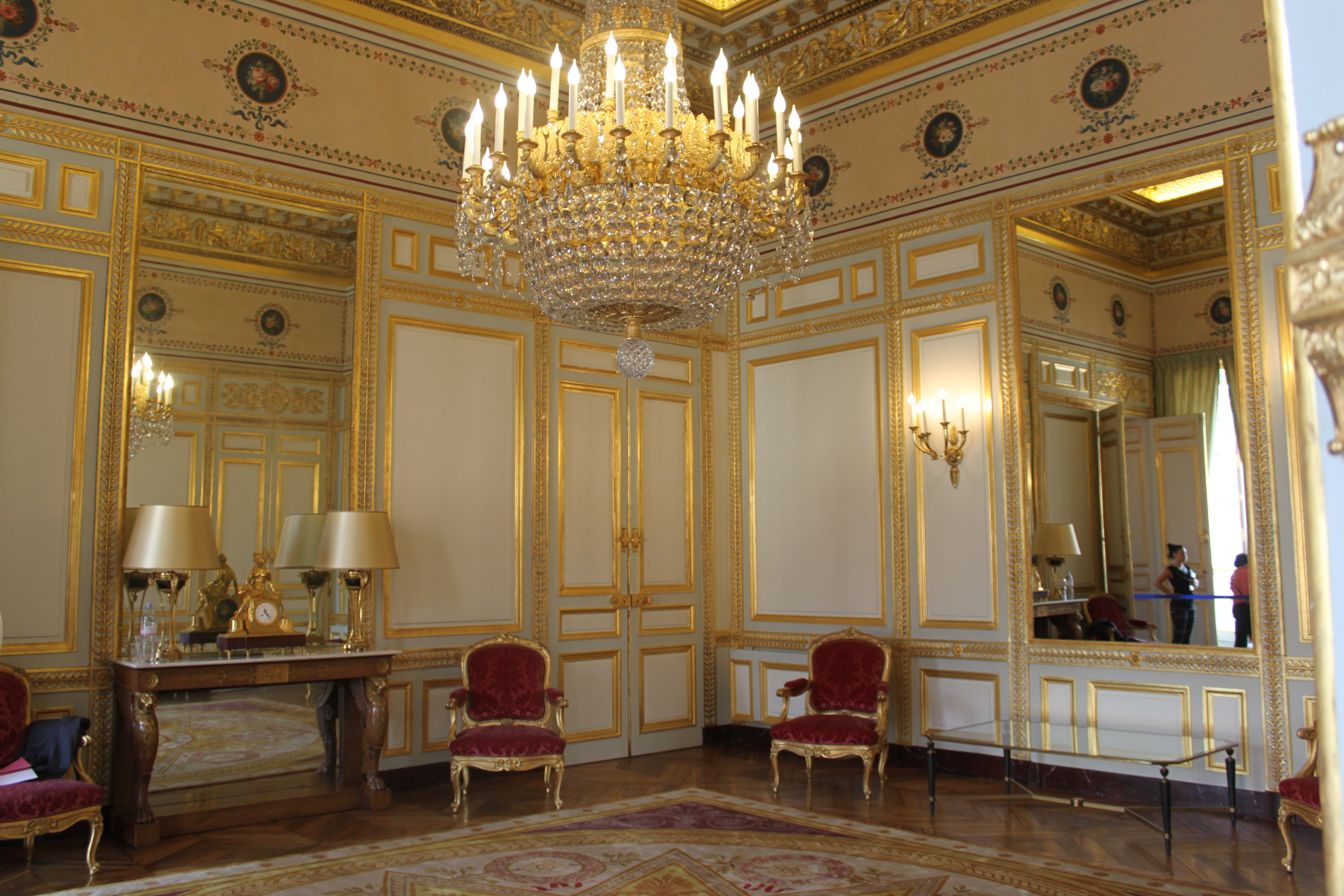
Petit Salon of the Constitutional Council

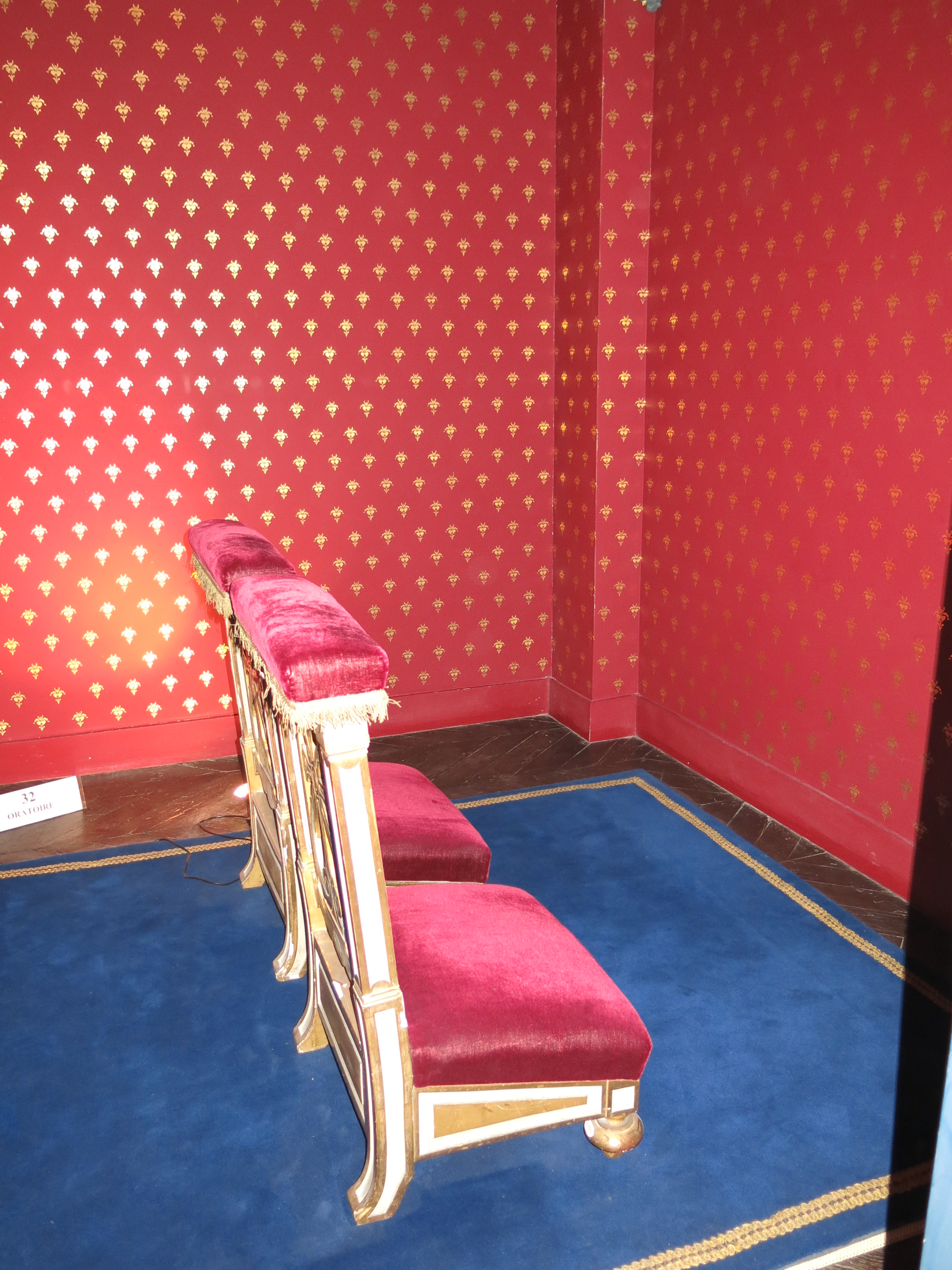
The Oratory, created by Princess Marie Clothilde

The Constitutional Council occupies an apartment of the palace that was originally built between 1829 and 1831 for the Duke of Chartres, the eldest son of King Louis-Philippe, though he chose to live instead in the Tuileries Palace. After 1859 it was the home of Prince Napoléon Bonaparte the second son of Jérôme Bonaparte, youngest brother of Napoleon I, and his wife, Princess Maria Clotilde of Savoy. The decor made by Fontaine comes from that period.

The grand stairway has two flights of stairs, each with a landing, while the first floor is surrounded by Ionic columns and topped with caisson vaults. Light comes from skylights in the vaults, reflected by rows of mirrors. A marble bust representing Rome, which originally was in the collection of Cardinal Richelieu, decorates the stairway landing. A modern addition is the chandelier made by Claude Lalanne and installed in 1999. The meeting room of the council, the dining room of Prince Napoleon and Marie Clotilde, was made after 1860 by the state architect Pierre Prosper Chabrol with murals in the style of ancient Pompei. One unusual feature of the apartment is the small, windowless oratory, a small place for prayer, with a statue of the Virgin, and walls covered with red and gold fabric, made for Marie Clotilde next to the bedroom. It was restored to its original appearance in 1980.

=== Courtyard of Honor ===
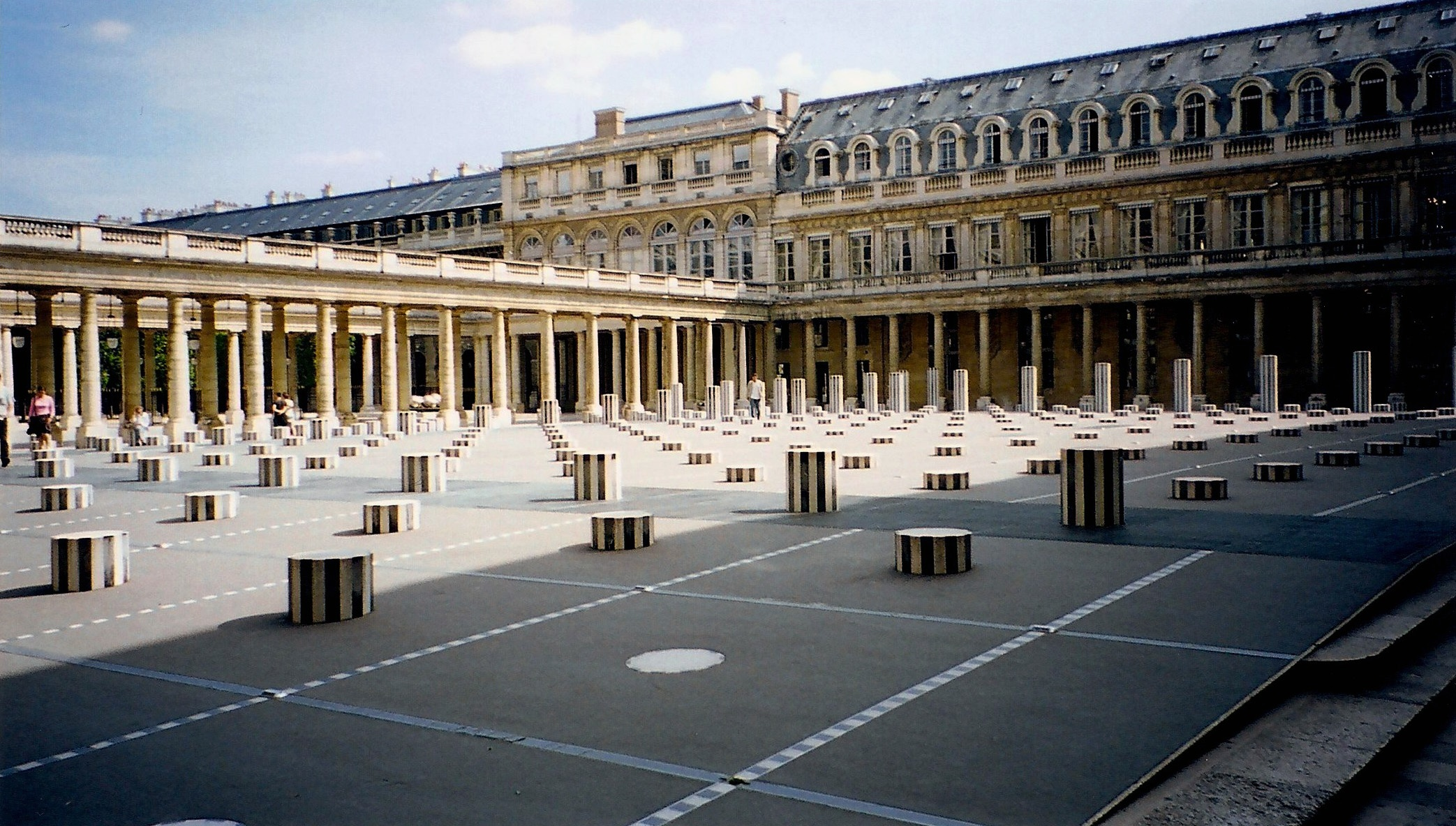
Courtyard of Honor, with installation of columns by Daniel Buren

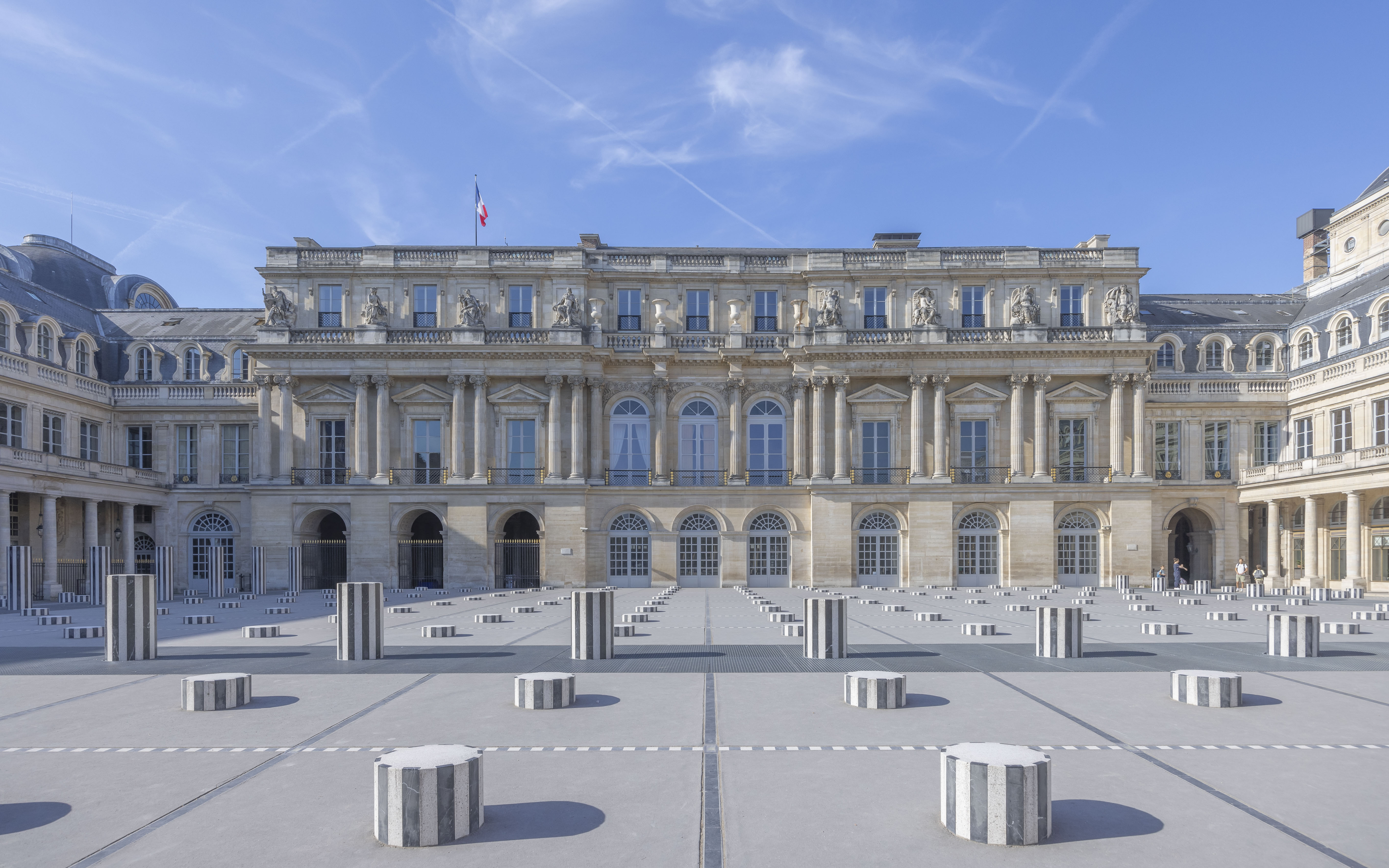
The courtyard and the Council of State north facade

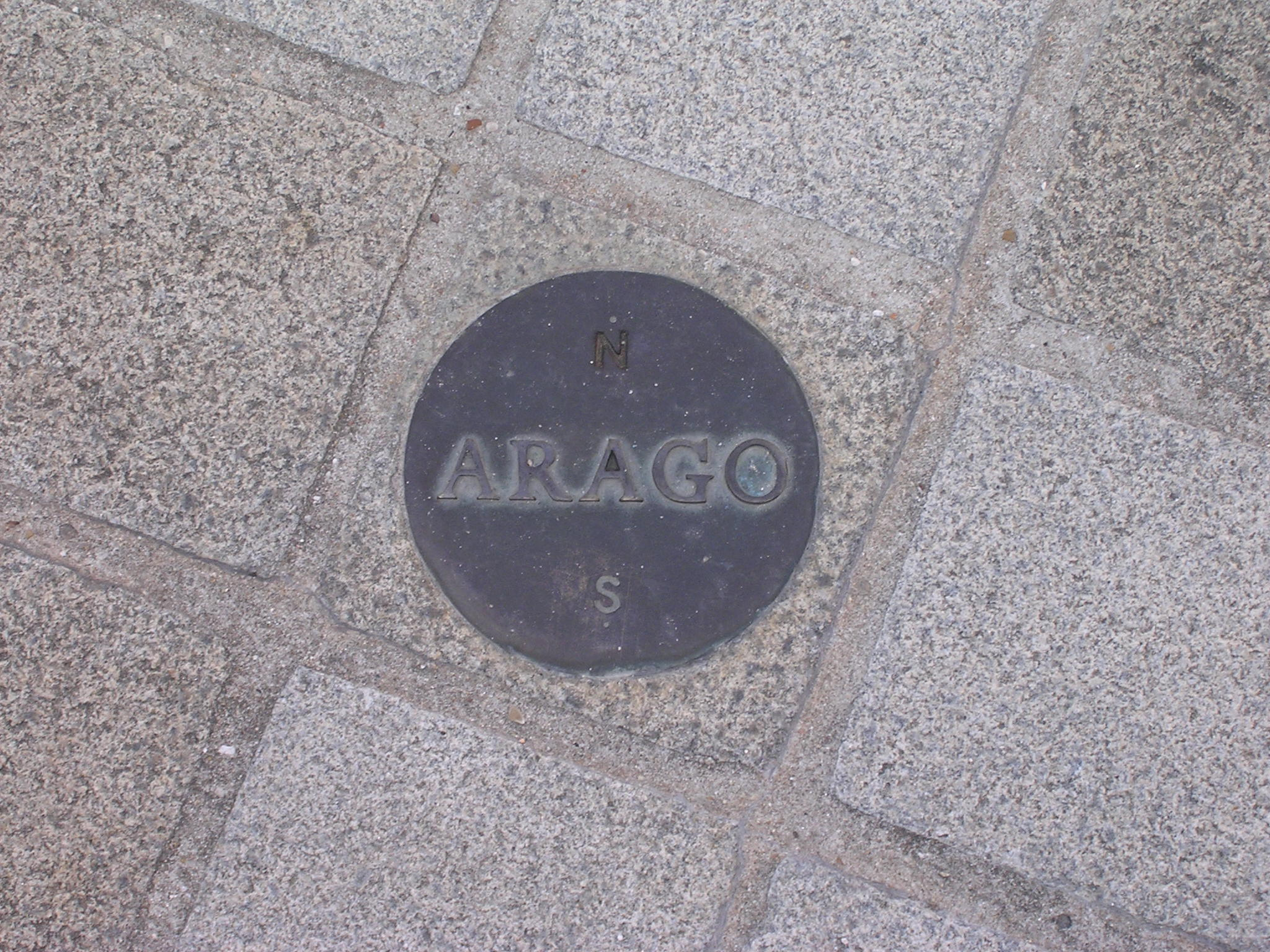
Homage to Arago plaque, making the Paris meridian

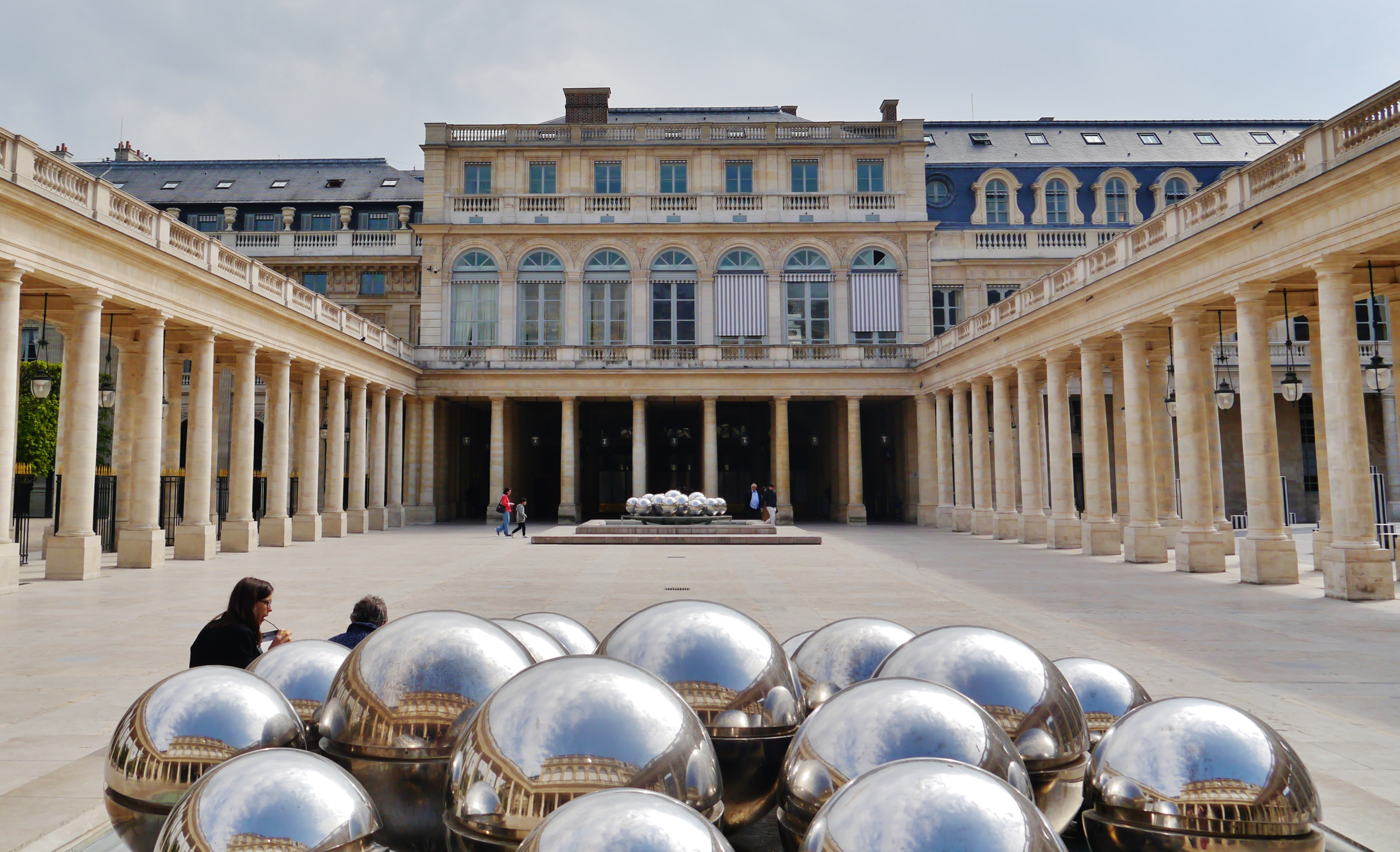
Courtyard of Honor, with the spheres of the Palais-Royal fountain visible.

Behind the Council of State, and separated from the gardens by two rows of columns, which once were part of the Gallery of Orleans, is another courtyard, the Courtyard of Honor, which was created in the 18th century on a foundation made by Victor Louis. Three arcades in the center of the Council building mark the passageway to the front side of the building. The façade facing the courtyard has pairs of Ionic columns topped by a balustrade, decorated with four classical statues, each three meters high, representing Mars, Apollo, and allegorical figures of Prudence and Liberality by the sculptor Augustin Pajou, which had been featured at the Paris Salon of 1769. On the other side of the balustrade are later statues of Commerce and Navigation and figures of Science, Agriculture, by Antoine Gerard, made in about 1830.

In 1985-86 the Ministry of Culture sponsored two sculptural works in the courtyard; the first, called "Photo-Souvenir - Les Deux Plateaux", by Daniel Buren, consists of short columns of various sizes arranged across the courtyard. The idea is to create two virtual platforms, without floors; the columns vary in height because of differences in height of the illusionary platforms; some of the column rows are purely horizontal, aligned to the height of the column bases of the gallery of Orleans, while the smaller columns all rise to the elevation of a lower non-existent platform; their variation in height is caused by the difference of elevation in parts of the courtyard. Each column has vertical bands of black and white.

The second work is composed of two fountains by sculptor Pol Bury, located within the roofless Gallery of Orleans, which separates the courtyard from the gardens. It consists of two square basins each containing seventeen polished metal spheres of different sizes, with water flowing around them. The polished spheres reflect the architecture of the arcades around them.

A third work, commissioned in 1994 is by the Dutch artist Jan Dibbets, passes through the courtyard of the Palais-Royal. It is called "Homage to Arago", and is a tribute to the French mathematician François Arago, who first conceived the Paris meridian, the north–south line passing through the center of Paris which marked the prime meridian (rather than Greenwich) on French maps. The work consists of one hundred thirty-five brass small brass plaques with the name "Arago" fixed on the pavement on a line which passes through the Palais-Royal, and extends on the same axis to the north and south across Paris.

=== Gardens ===
The first garden of the Palais was planted by Cardinal Richelieu in 1629, where the Court of Honor is today. In 1633, Richelieu obtained authorisation to extend the garden northeast into the land occupied by the obsolete medieval city walls of Paris. He also received permission to sell forty-five building sites around the garden. The new garden site was 170 meters by 400 meters, making it the third largest garden in Paris, after the Tuileries Garden and Luxembourg Garden. The new garden featured long alleys shaded by trees, elaborate parterres and flower beds, a fountain in the centre, and a circular water basin at the north end. The master hydraulics engineer Jean-Baptiste Le Tellier designed the fountain, which, like the Louvre Palace, took its water from the La Samaritaine pump on the Seine.

The garden was redesigned several times, notably in 1674 by André Le Nôtre, and his nephew Claude Desgots in 1730. In 1817, under Charles X of France, the main water basin was enlarged to twenty-five meters in diameter, and the longitudinal parterres were remade in 1824. In 1992 the landscape gardener Mark Rudkin created new lawns and flower beds, termed "Salons of greenery", with seasonal flowers enclosed by grills covered with climbing plants. The garden was classified as a French historical monument in 1920, followed by the rest of the Palais-Royal in 1994.

A small cannon was installed in the middle of the bowling green at the north end of the garden in 1786. It fired a shot each day at noon, regulated by an ingenious mechanism that used a magnifying lens pointed at the sun's noontime position to light the match which fired the gunpowder. Between 1891 and 1911, the official noontime in France was defined by the cannon shot. It was stolen in 1998, but recovered and returned to its place in 2002.

The two major alleys of the gardens are named for two of the famous 20th-century residents of the neighbouring buildings, the writers Colette and Jean Cocteau.

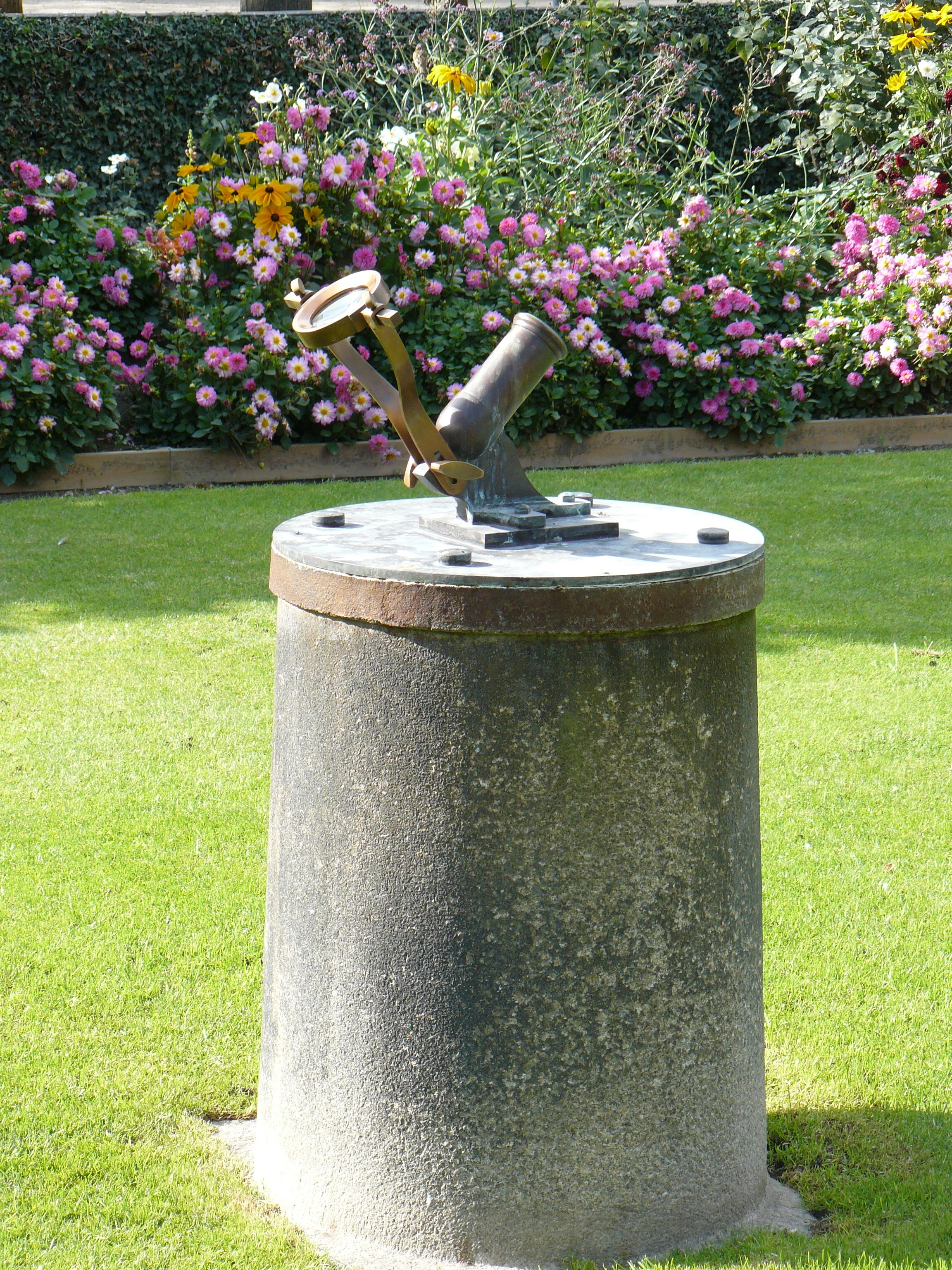
The noon cannon in the bowling green, triggered by the noontime sun

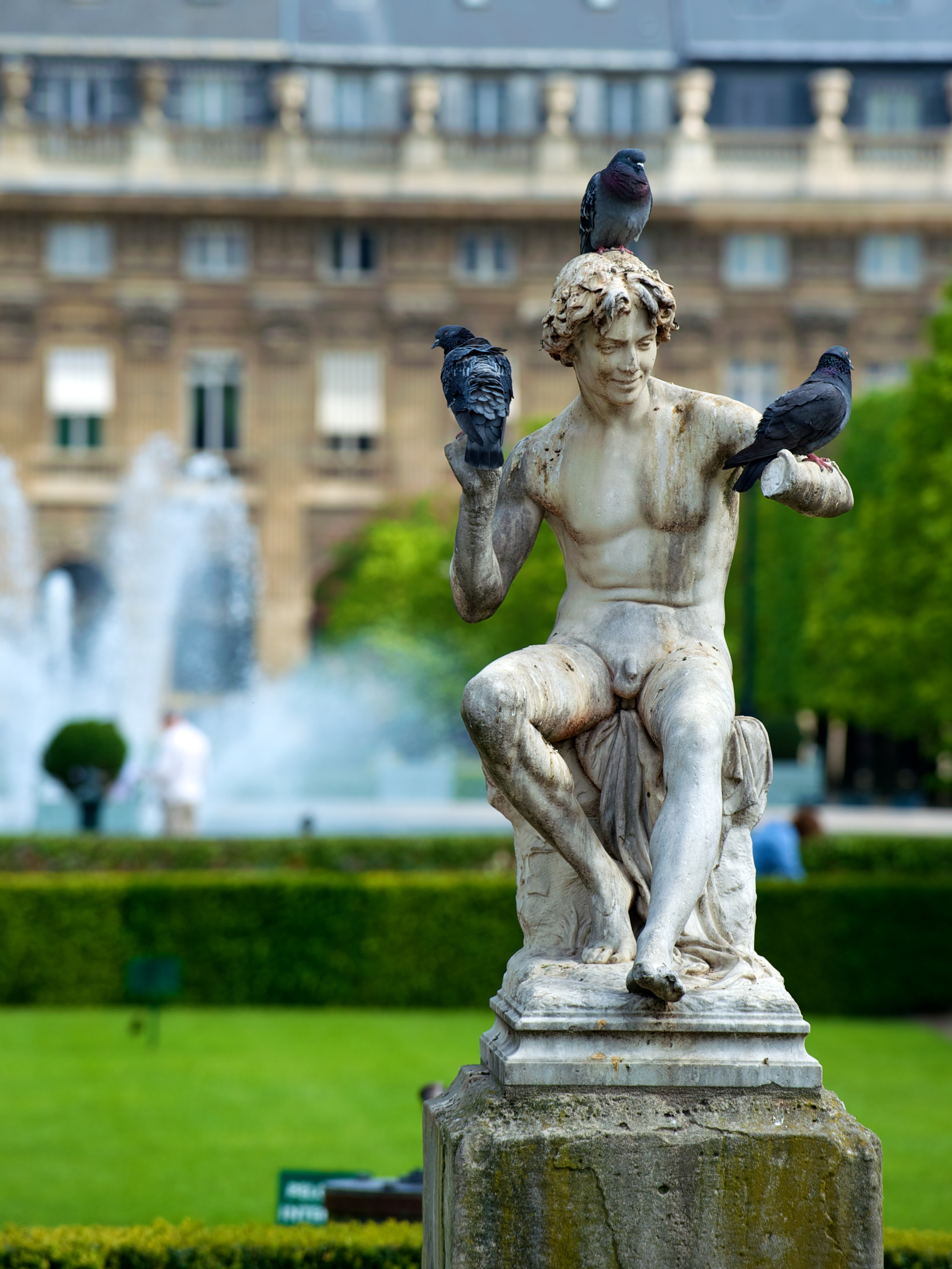
Fountain in the gardens

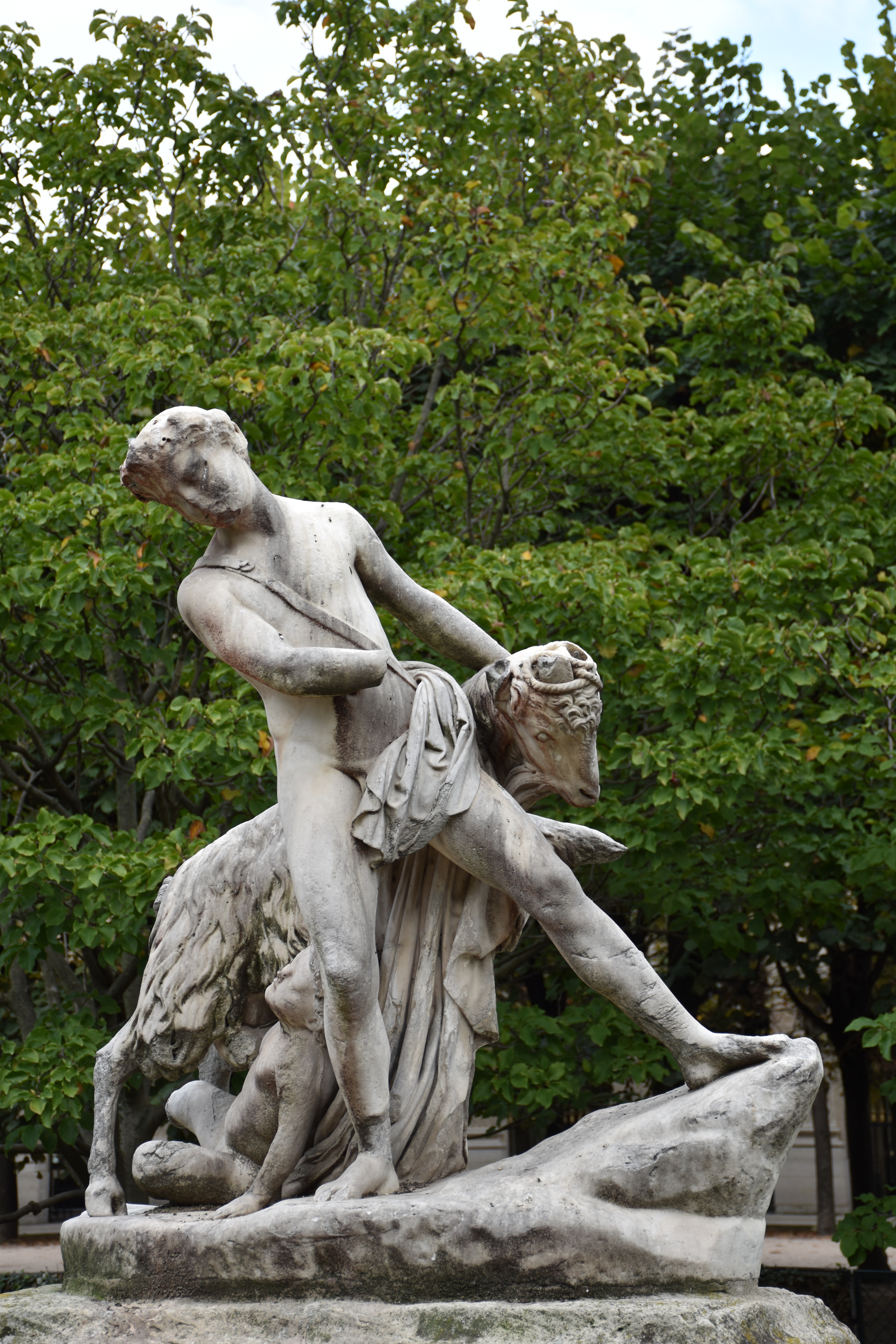
Paul Lemoyne, The Shepherd and the Goat (1830), marble

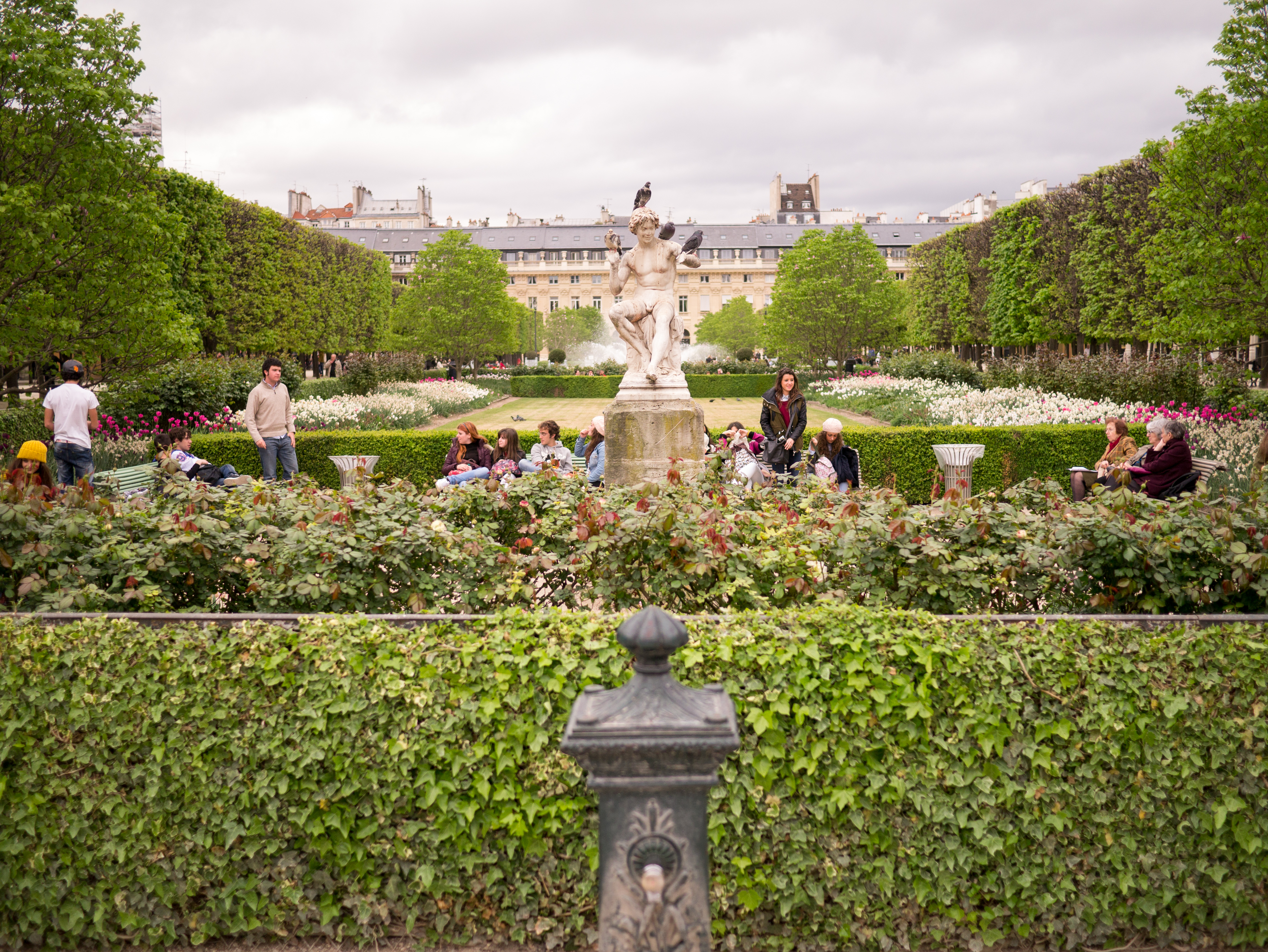
Gardens of the Palais-Royal

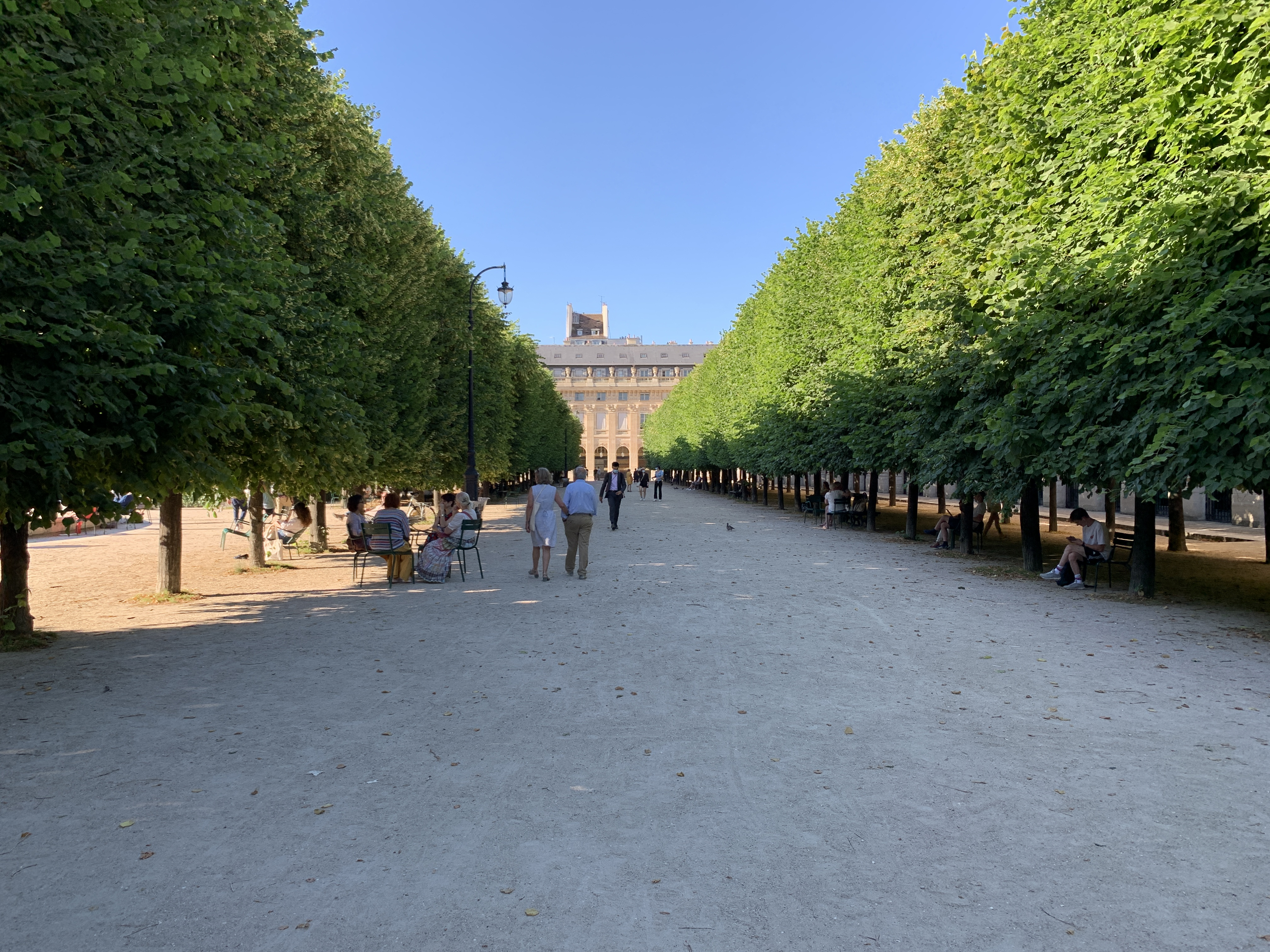
The Alley of Colette

=== Town houses ===
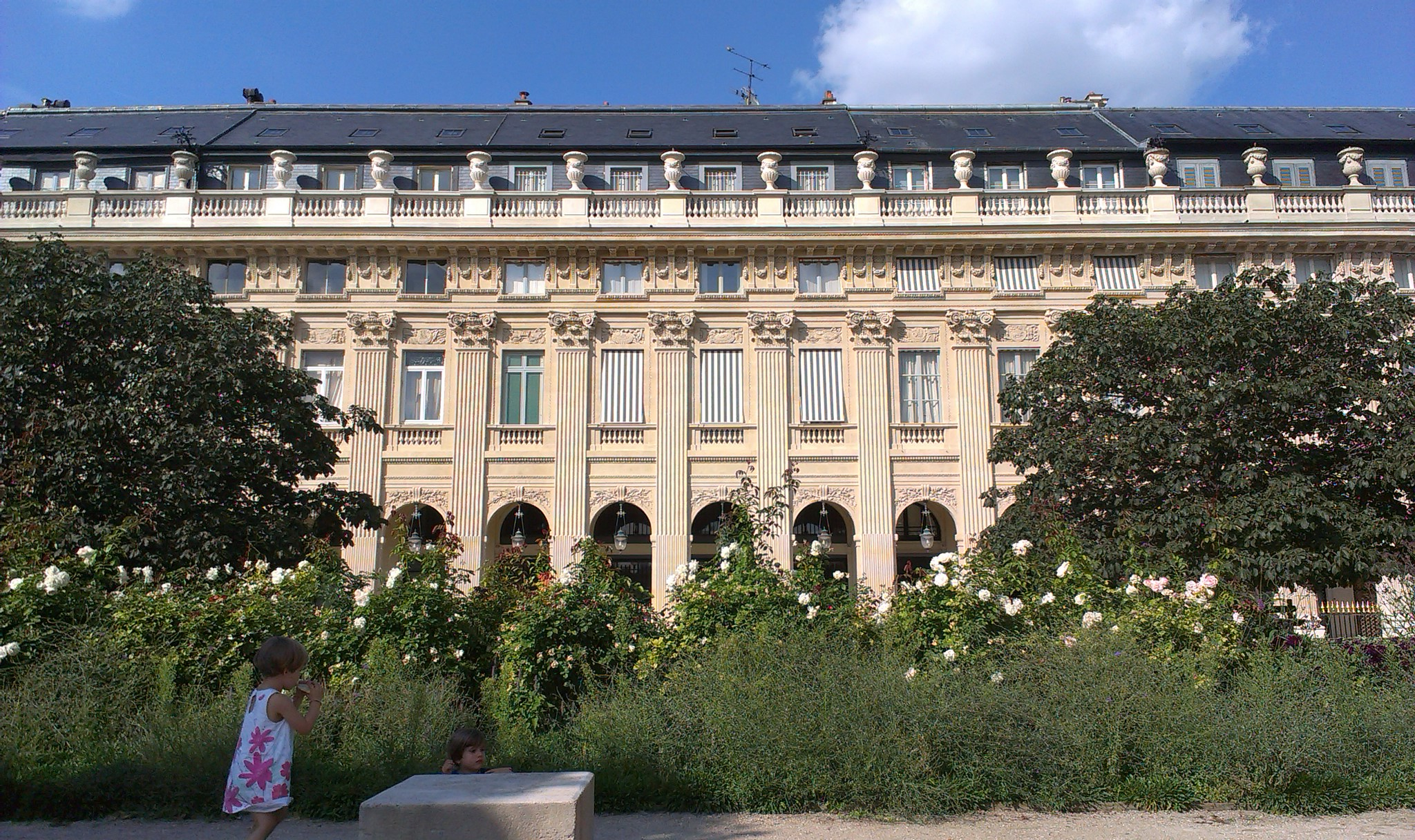
Unified façade of town houses overlooking garden

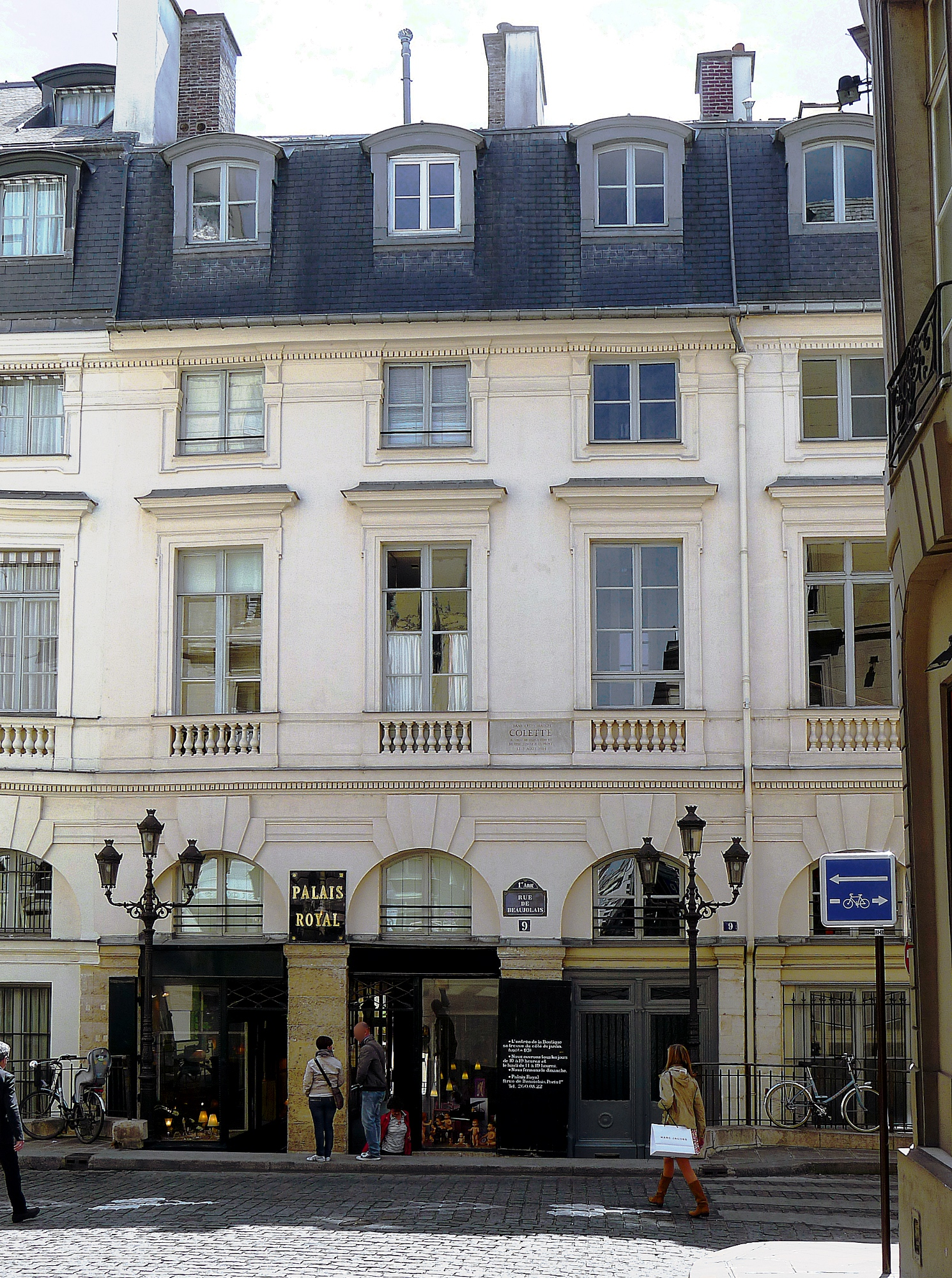
Colette's town house entrance at 9 rue de Beaujolais

Near the end of the 18th century the architect Victor Louis designed rows of town houses on three sides of the garden, which extend 275 meters on the east and west and about one hundred meters on the north. Each has a gallery and boutiques on the ground floor, topped by an entresol, then residential floors. The entrances are on the streets outside the palace. Louis artfully merged the façades of the houses facing the garden together, giving each wing the appearance of a single long building. The unified sculptural decoration of the façades features classical pilasters, balustrades and bas-relief sculpture.

At first the town houses were rented, but between 1787 and 1790, as the Revolution began, their owner, the Duke of Chartres, sold sixty-seven houses. Colette occupied the entresol of the house at number 9 rue de Beaujolais in 1927, then moved to the first floor from 1938 until 1954. Her friend, the film-maker and writer Jean Cocteau lived on the other side, at 36 rue de Montpensier. They regularly had breakfast together at the Le Grand Vefour restaurant in the arcades. The two alleys in the garden are now named after them.

=== Galleries ===
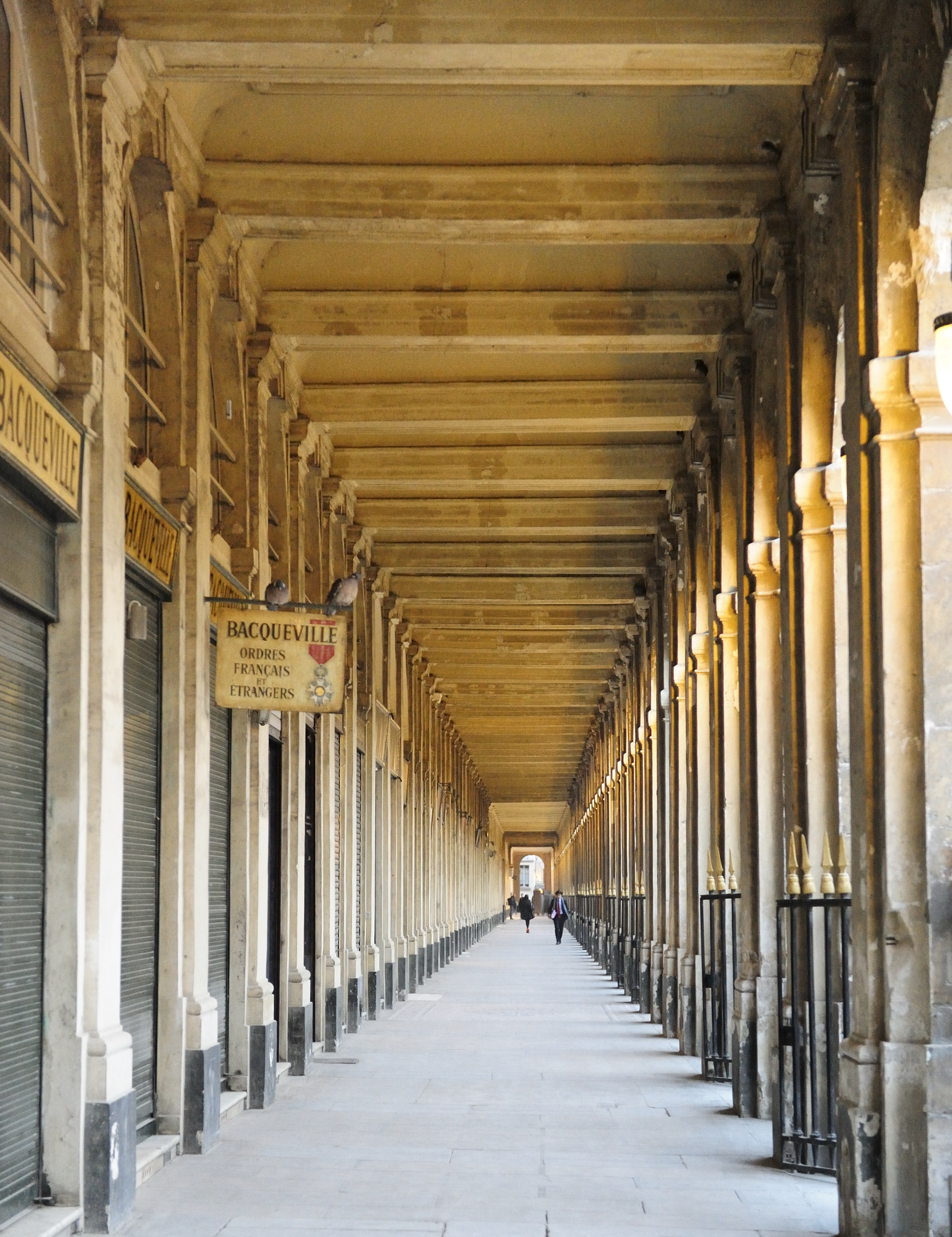
Galerie of Montpensier today

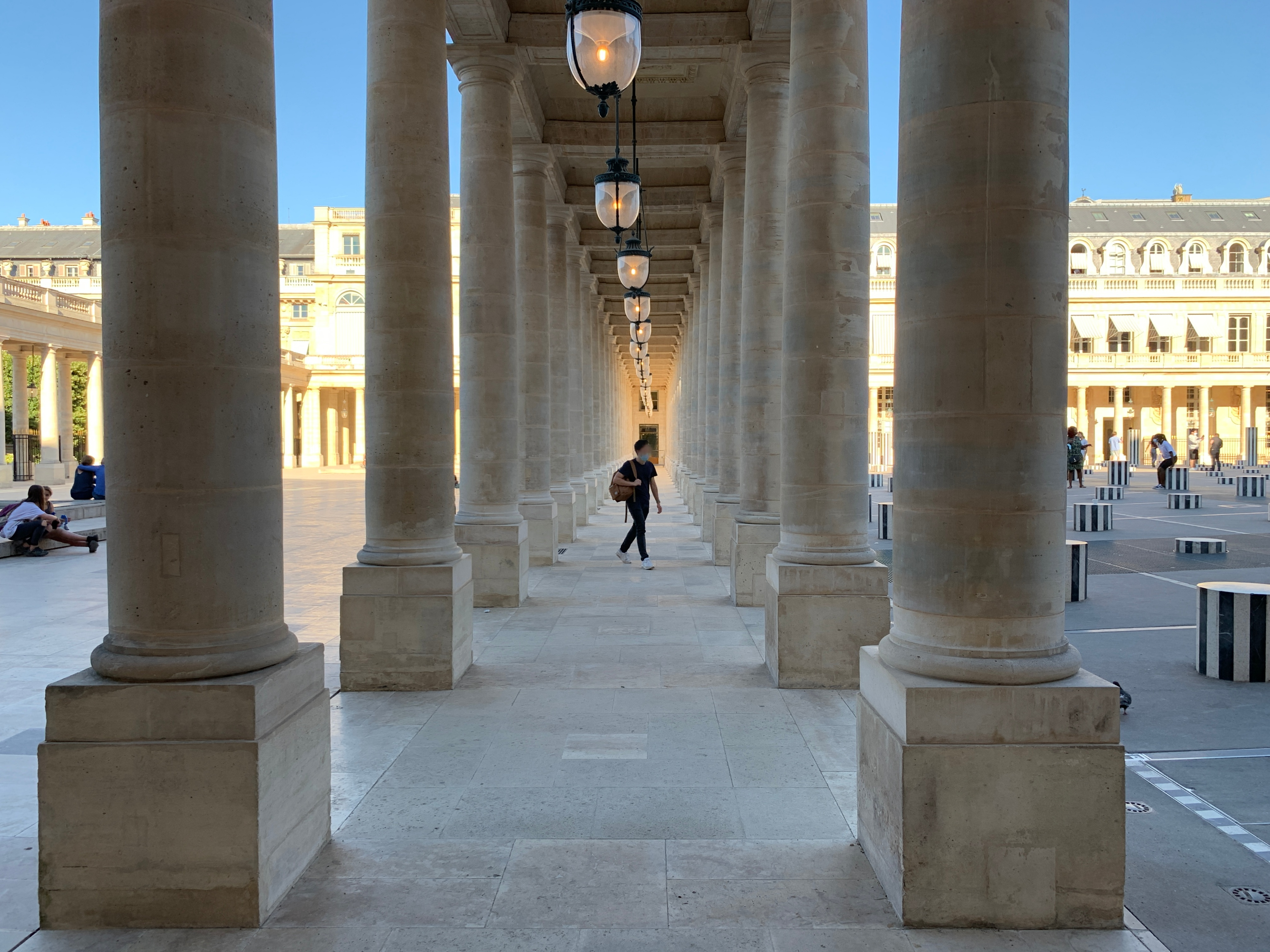
Gallery of the Court of Honor, formerly part of Gallery d'Orleans

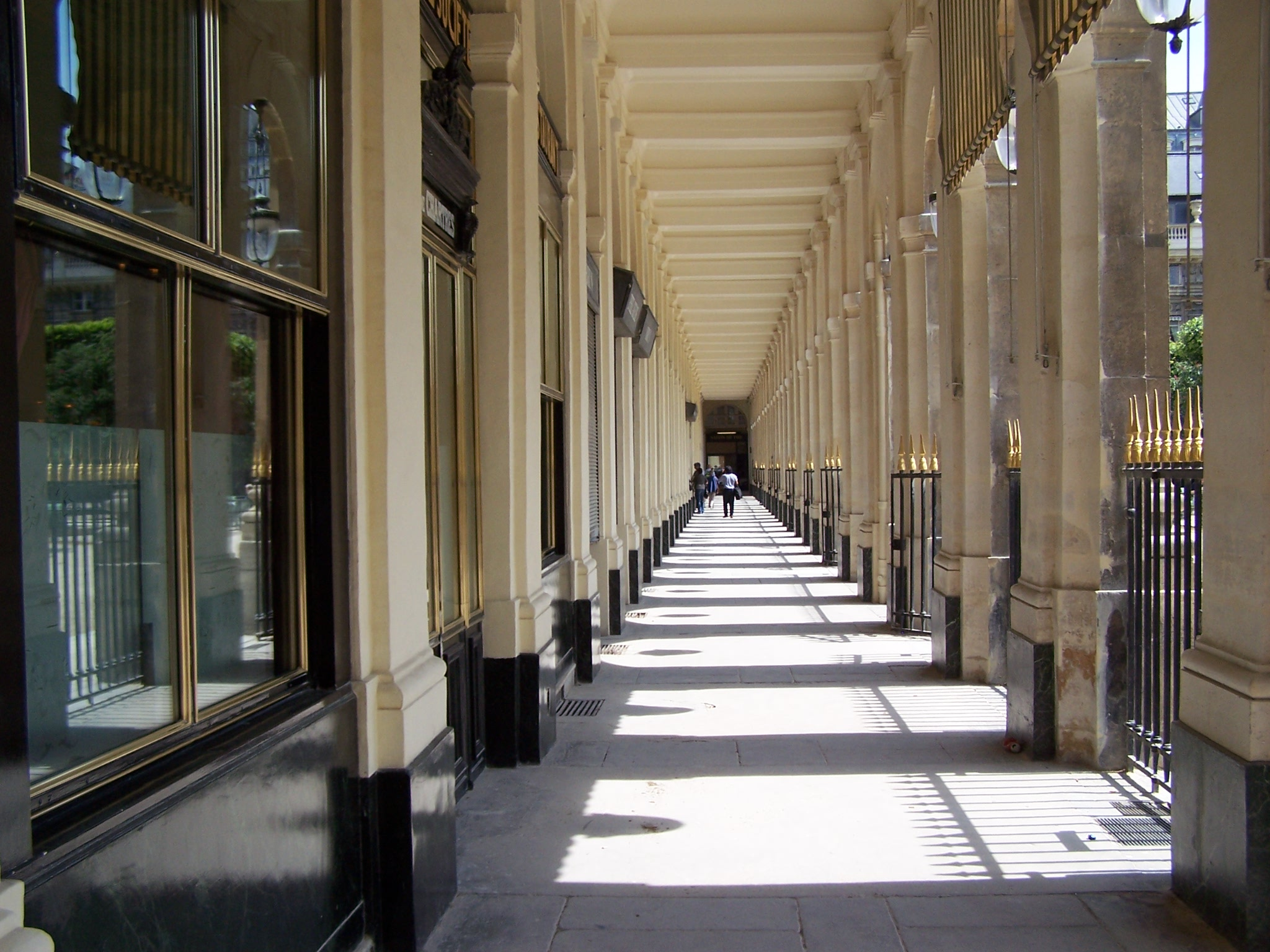
Gallery of Beaujolais

The six-story buildings that surround the gardens on three sides have galleries on the ground floor containing shops and restaurants The garden galleries were constructed 1781–1784 to the designs of the Victor Louis. On the west side is the Montpensier Gallery, on the north, the Beaujolais Gallery, and to the east, the Valois Gallery. Traversing the south side of the garden are two parallel colonnades, remnants of the former covered Galerie d'Orléans (demolished in 1930). They stand between the court of honor and the garden. In 1992, the first boutique of the perfume brand Serge Lutens was opened in the Palais-Royal.

=== Restaurants - Le Grand Véfour ===
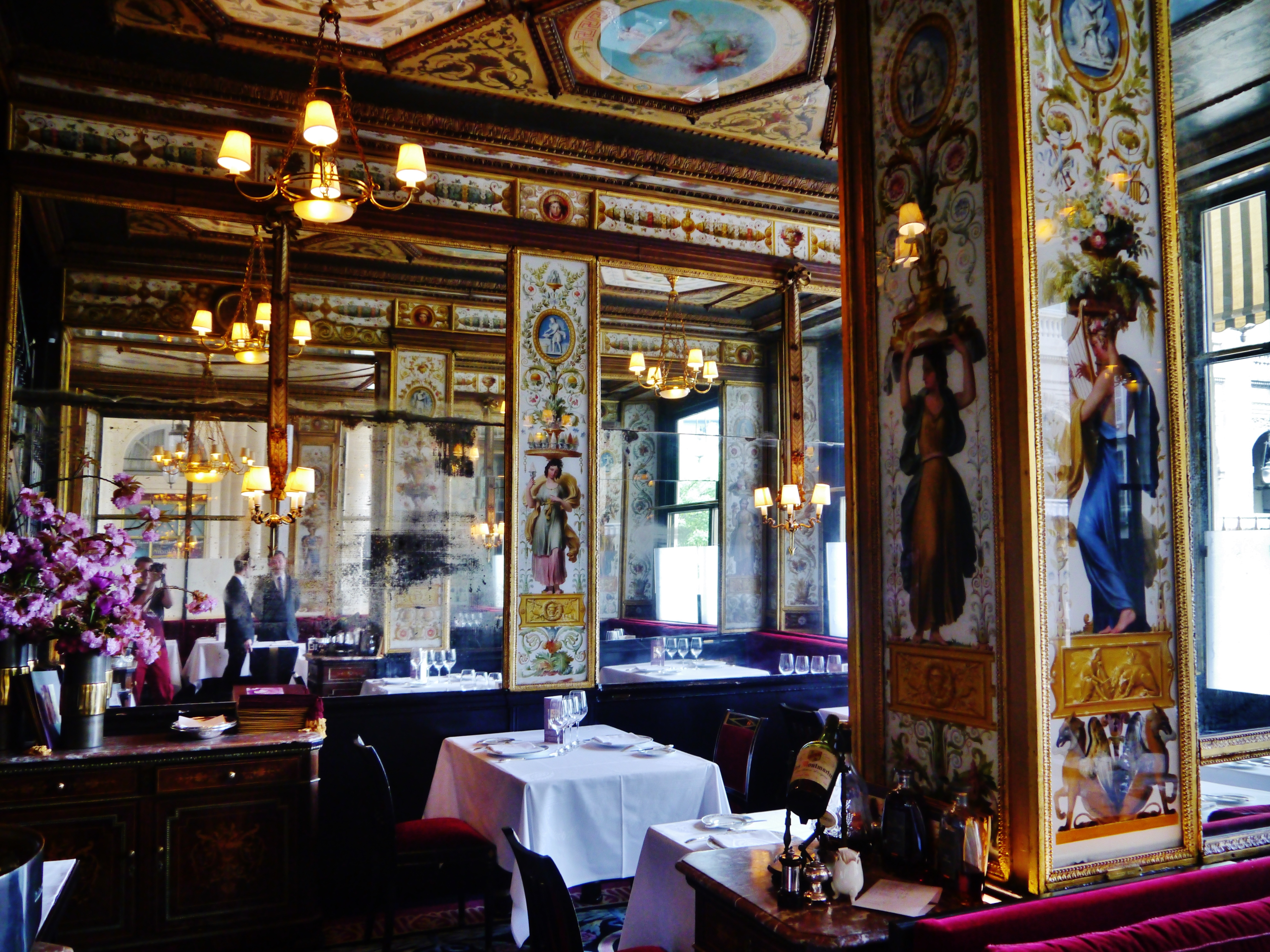
The Restaurant Le Grand Véfour, opened in 1784 as the Café de Chartres

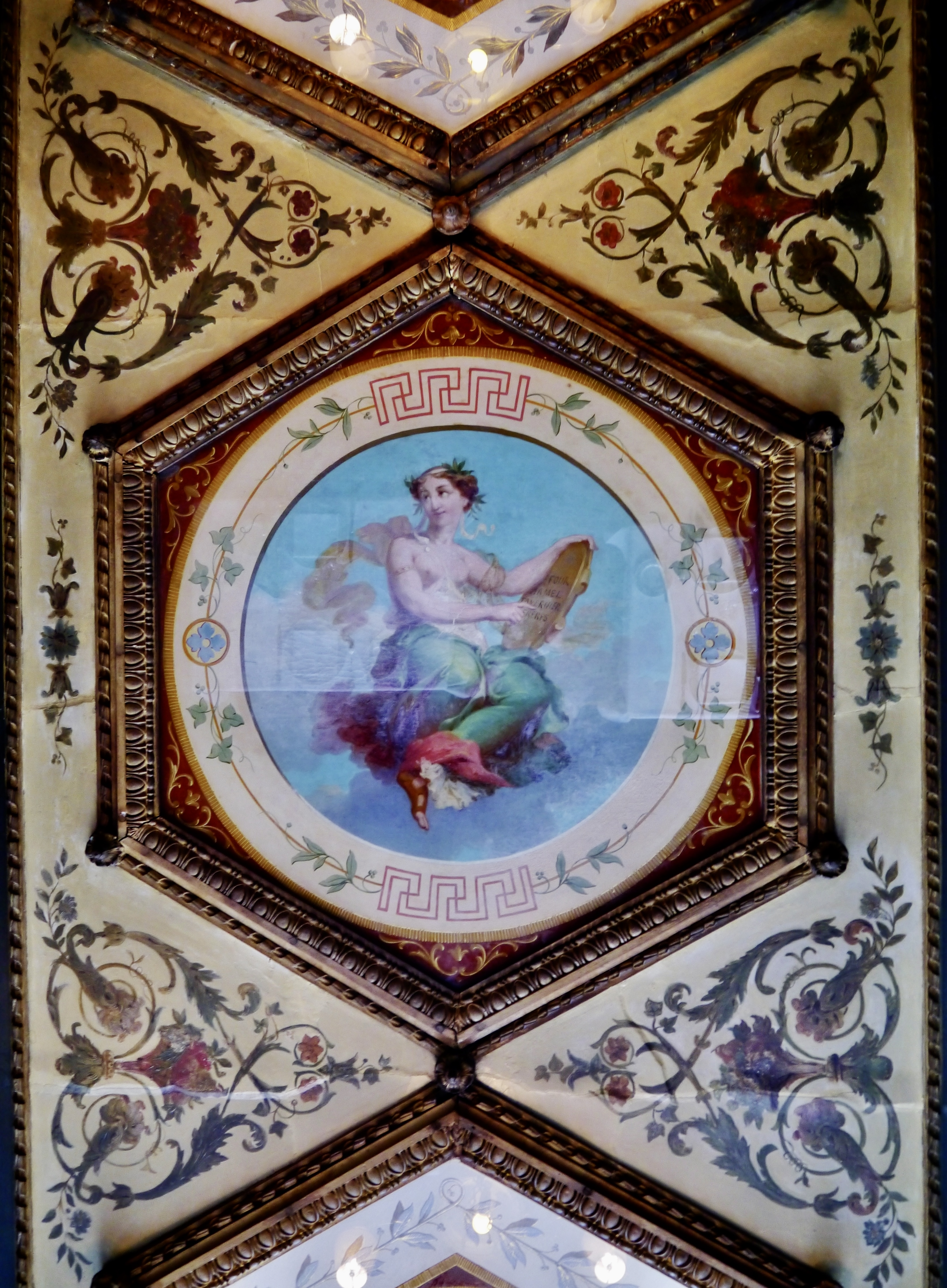
Ceiling of the Restaurant Grand Véfour

The Palais-Royal was famous for its restaurants, particularly following the French Revolution, when chefs of aristocratic families who had fled France opened their own restaurants. One surviving restaurant from this period is Le Grand Véfour, It opened in 1784 as the Café de Chartres. In the 20th century it was a favorite dining spot for Colette and Jean Cocteau, and preserves much of its original decor.

=== Theater of the Comédie Française ===
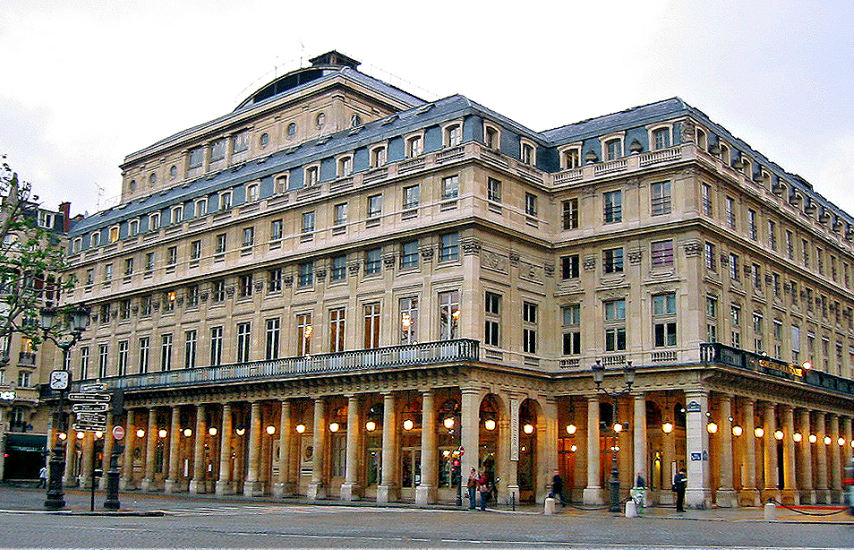
The Salle Richelieu, principal theater of the Comédie-Française

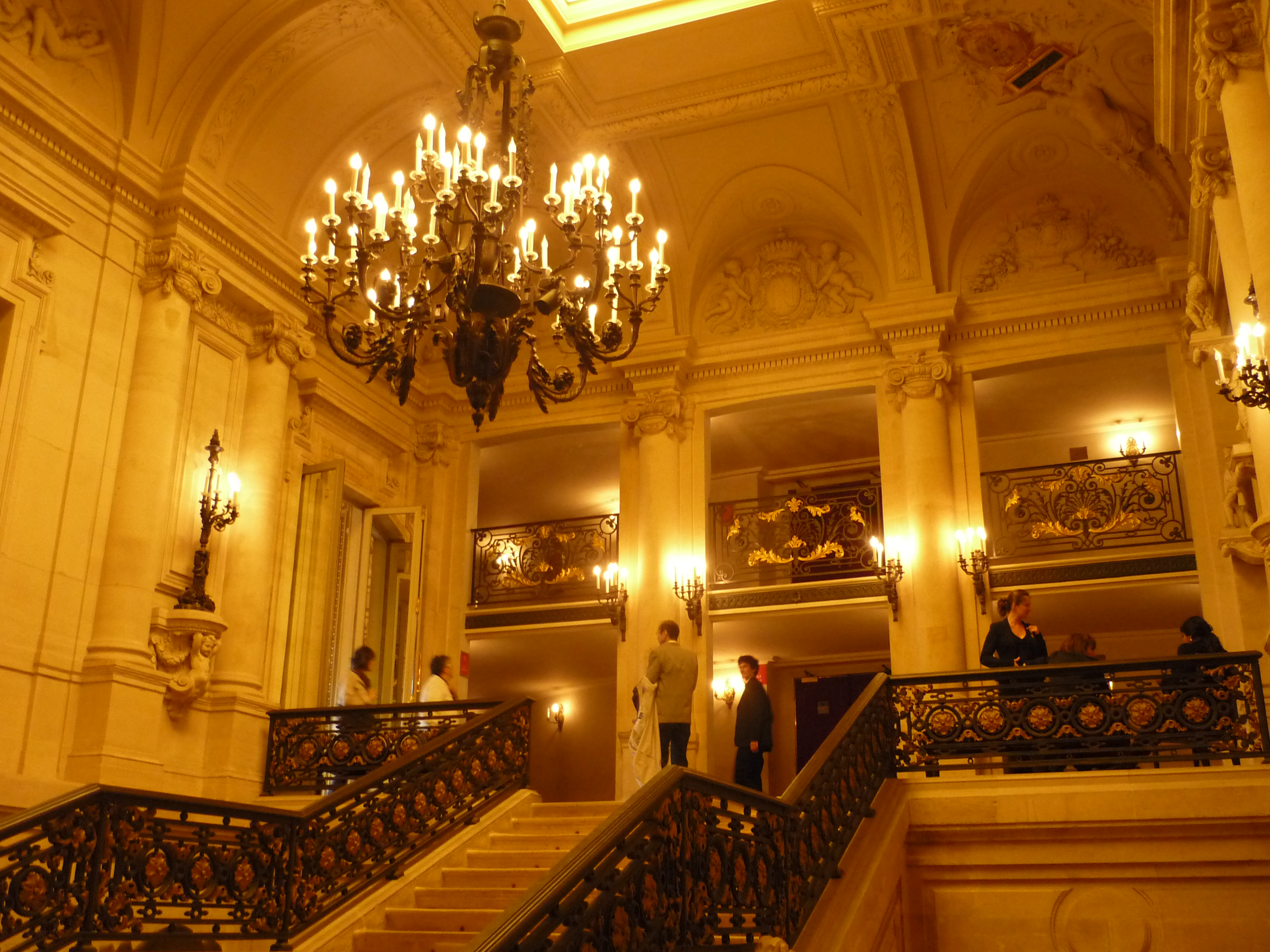
The grand staircase

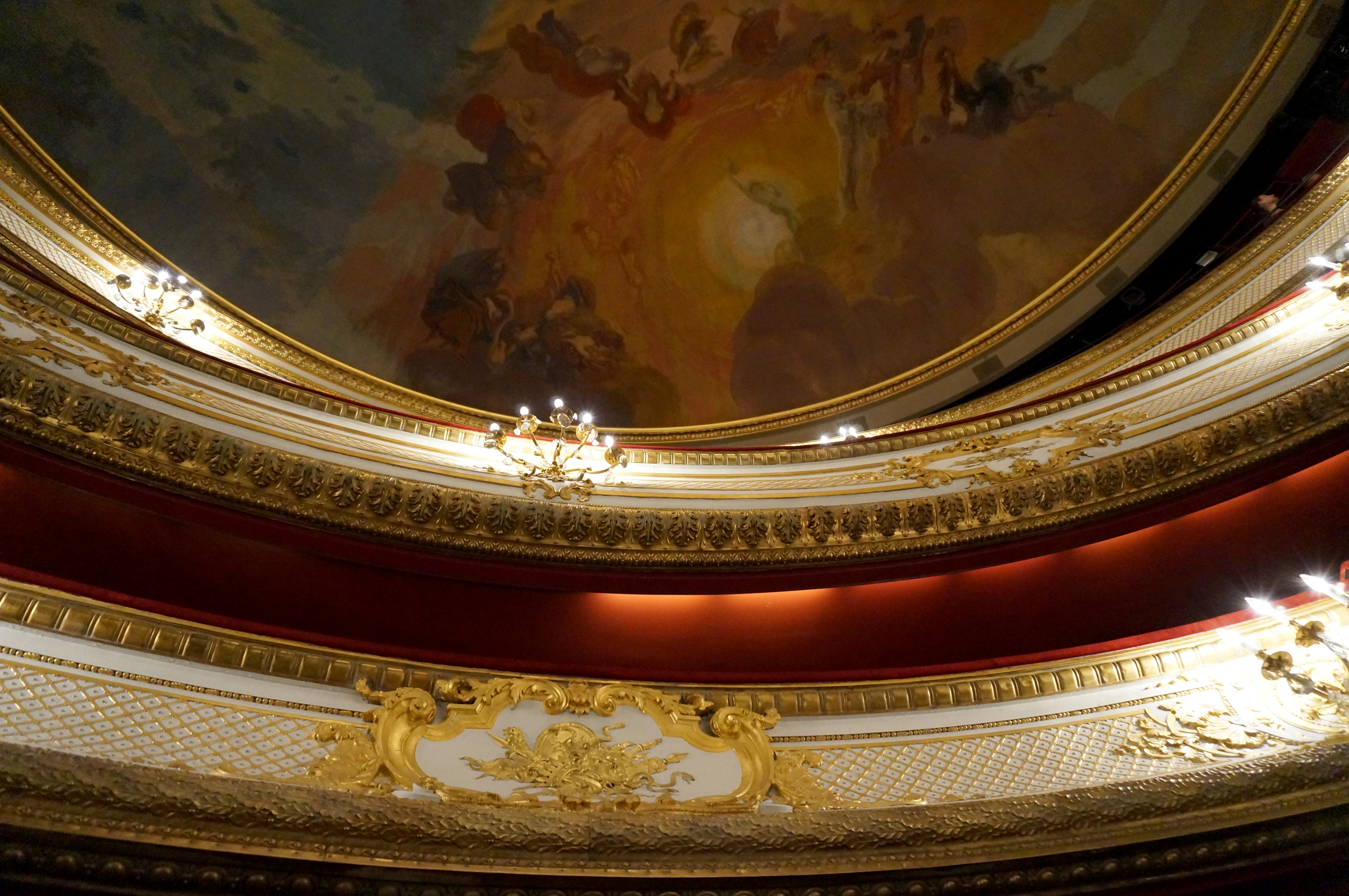
Balconies of the Salle Richelieu

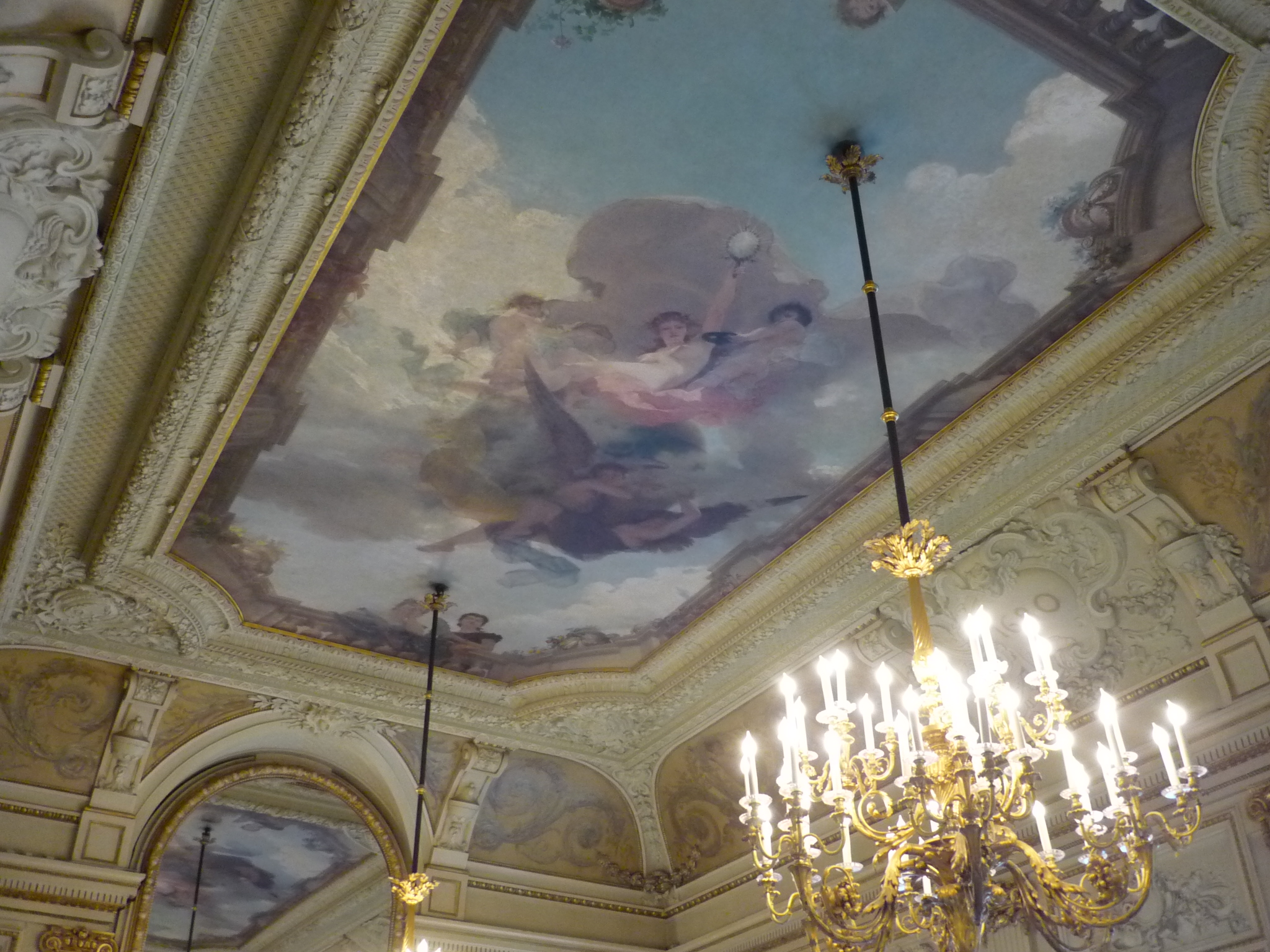
Ceiling of the Pierre Dux salon of the foyer

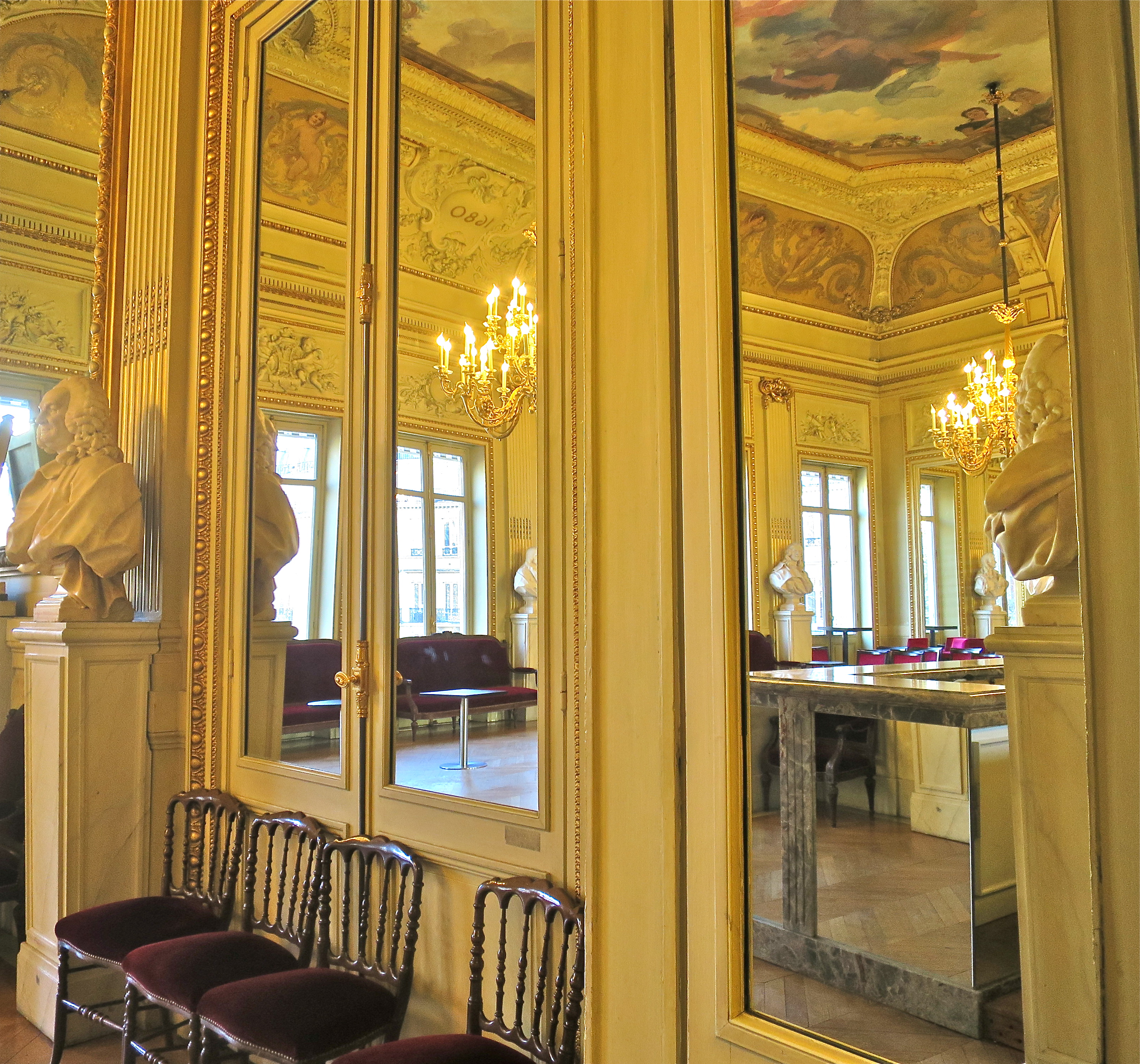
Mirrors of the foyer multiply the space

The Salle Richelieu, now the principal theater of the Comédie Française, was designed by Victor Louis and completed in 1786. It was inaugurated on 15 May 1790. The theater was extensively remodelled over the years; only the exterior walls and columns of the peristyle of the original theater survive, but the reconstructions have preserved the original plan and style.

The site was quite small for such a large theater, 44 by 32 metres, so Louis was compelled to stack the seven levels of the theater directly on top of the vestibule on the ground floor. The auditorium of the theater is in the form of an oval. Four stairways serve the seven levels. Balconies, loges and galleries fill the different levels. Four massive columns frame the stage. The hall is covered by a large cupola supported by pendentives and decorated with frescoes, The interior is lavishly decorated in blue and green ornamented with gold, colors traditionally associated in the 18th century with classical theatres. Louis built the cupola with a metallic framework, which saved the structure when a fire struck the theater in 1900. The theater today can hold 2,000 spectators.

=== Théâtre du Palais-Royal ===
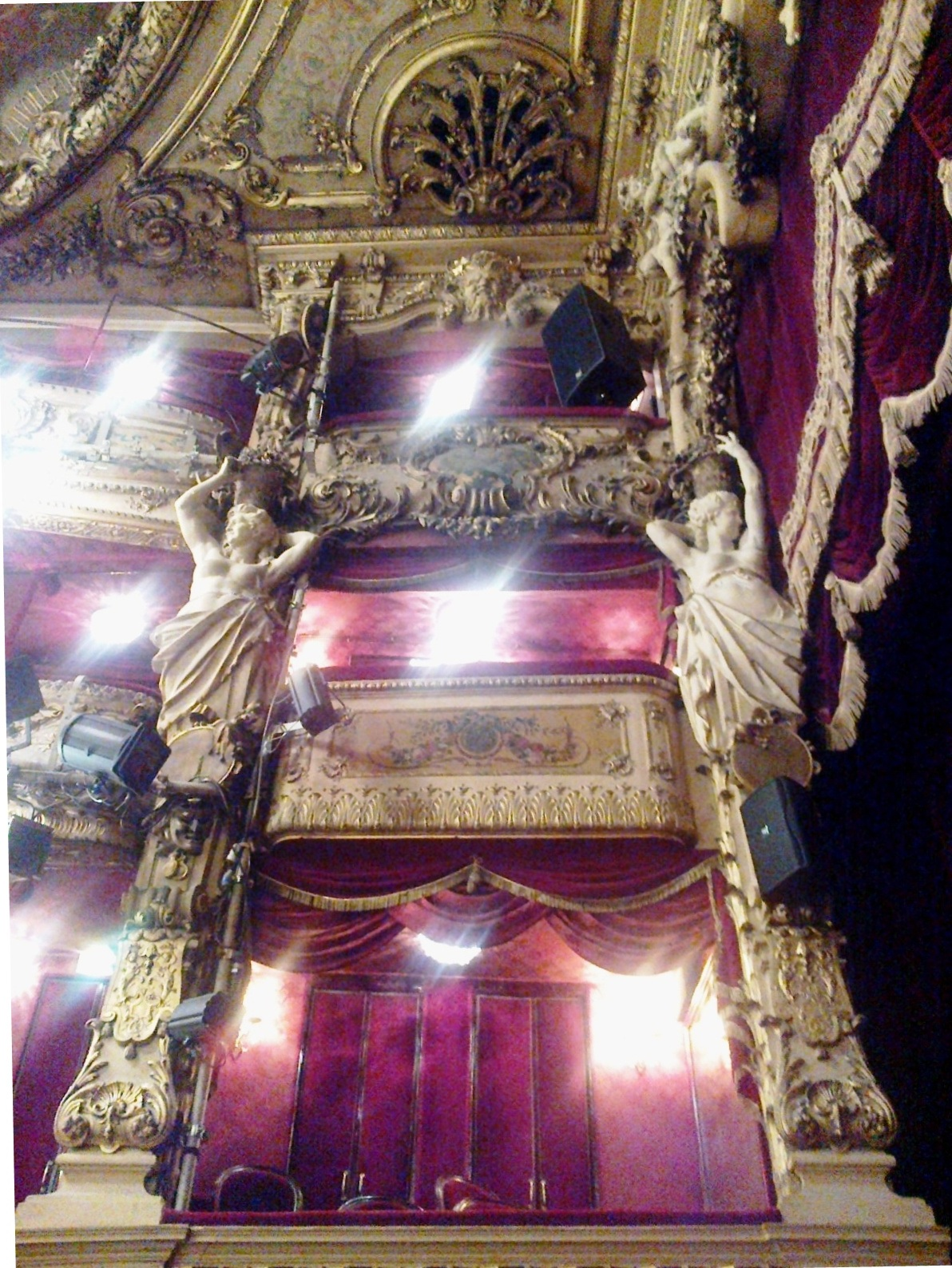
Statues of cariatides decorate boxes next to the stage

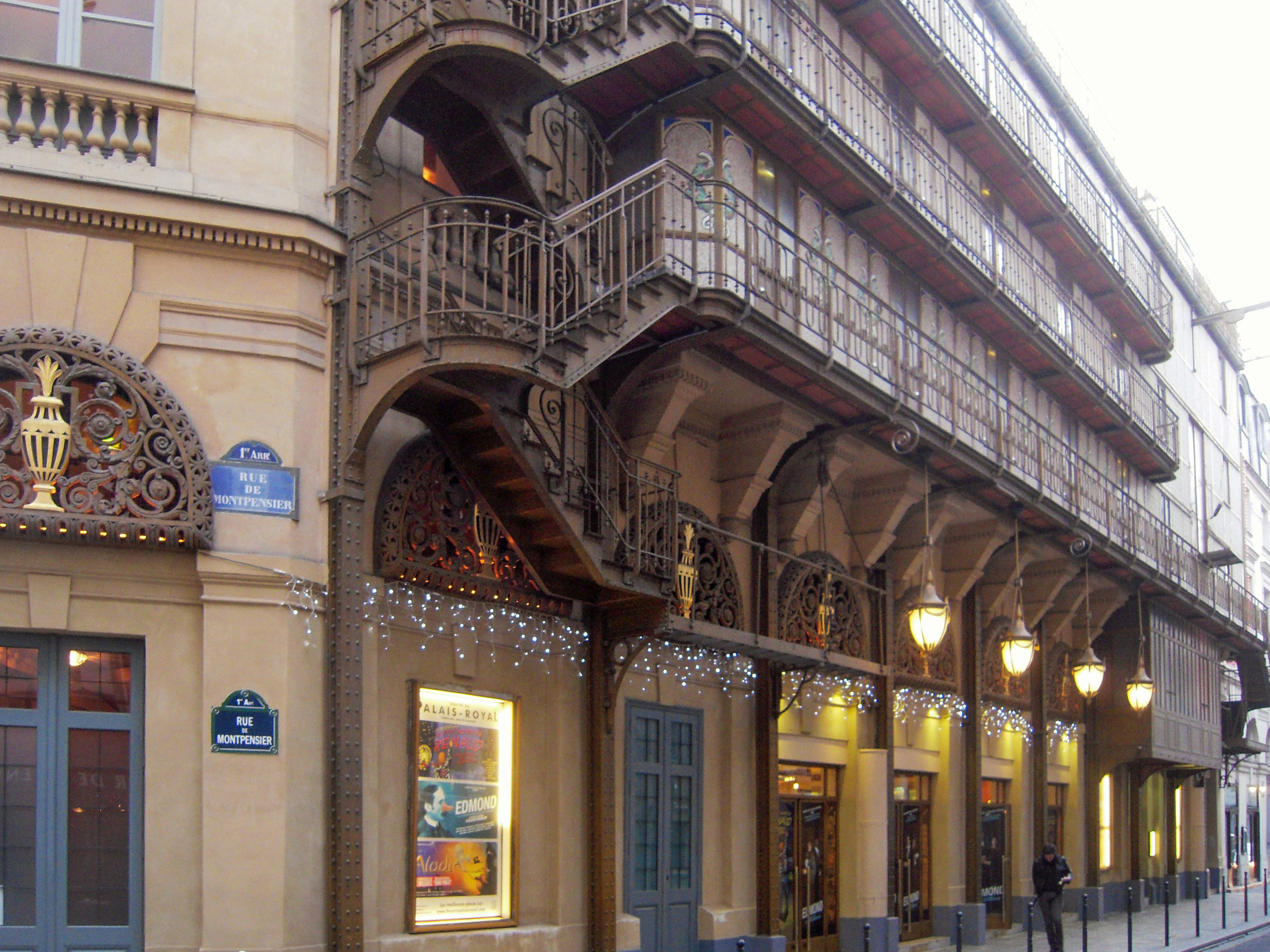
The Théâtre du Palais-Royal

The Théâtre du Palais-Royal is located on the northwest corner of the Palais-Royal, in the Galerie de Montpensier at its intersection with the Galerie de Beaujolais. It has 750 seats. The first theatre was built in 1784 by Victor Louis for the marionette theater of the Count of Beaujolais on its first floor. This was purchased in 1789 by the theatrical producer Mademoiselle Montansier, who had Louis rebuild it in 1791 into a larger variety theater, called the Montpensier-Variétés. The scandalous varieties of entertainment, and frequentation by prostitutes, who sought clients in the galleries of the Palais-Royal, led to the theater being closed down in 1806. In 1831, under the new regime of King Louis-Philippe, it was rebuilt and reopened as a legitimate theater, staging the plays of Victorien Sardou and Eugene Labiche among others. Concerns about theater fires caused the reconstruction in 1887 of the façade, with elaborate tiers of cast-iron fire escapes and polychrome ceramics. The architect of the façade was Paul Sédille, who also designed the interior of the Printemps department store (1881–89). The theatre is now classified as a French historical monument.

== Gallery ==
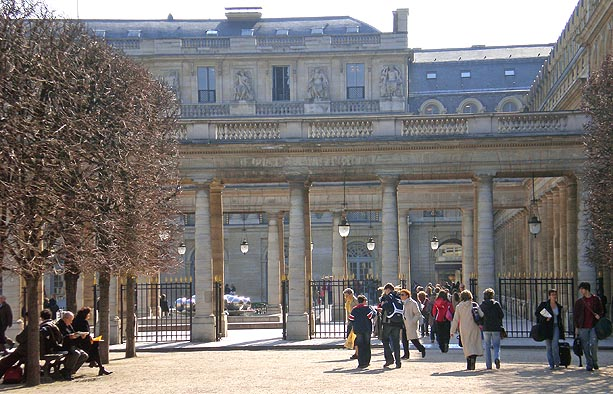
Garden-side view with the columns of the former Galerie d'Orléans

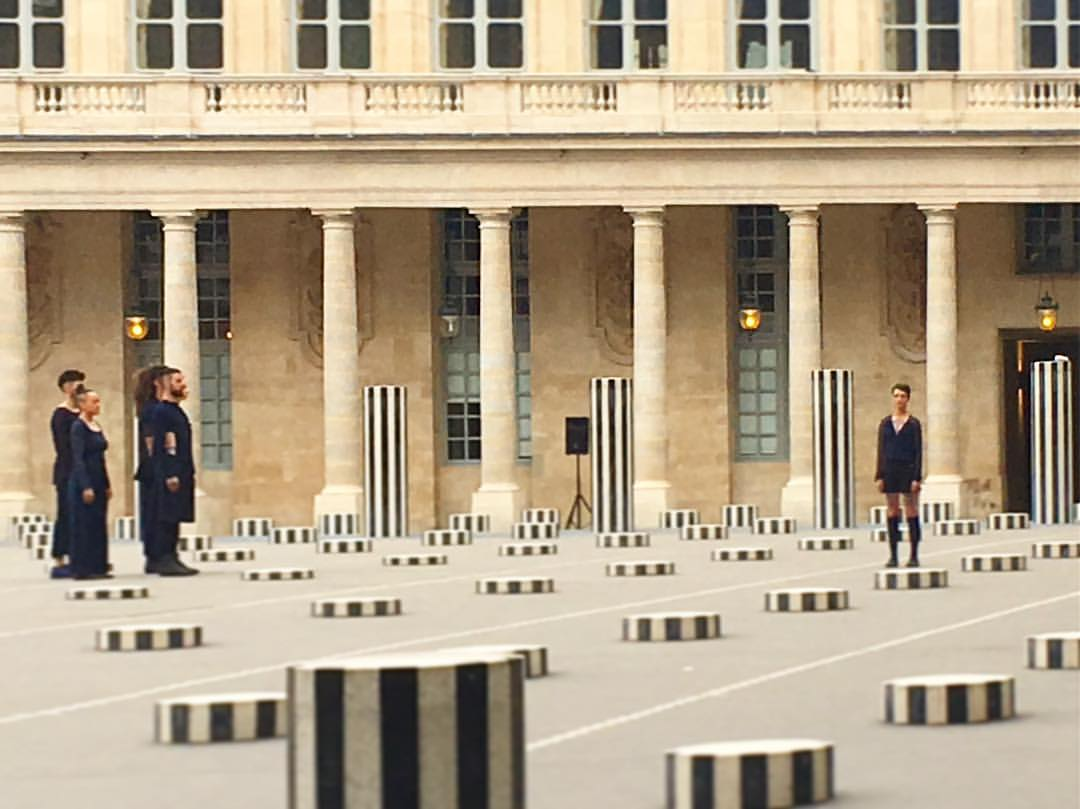
Dancers of the Nathalie Pernette company perform her dance piece La Figure du Baiser in May 2017 within the Columns of Buren at the Palais-Royal.

== See also ==
- History of parks and gardens of Paris
- Hôtel de Rambouillet
- Suzanne Lagier
- Louvre Palace
- Tuileries Palace
