= Palais-Royal Garden =

Public garden in the 1st arrondissement of Paris

- Jardin du Palais-Royal
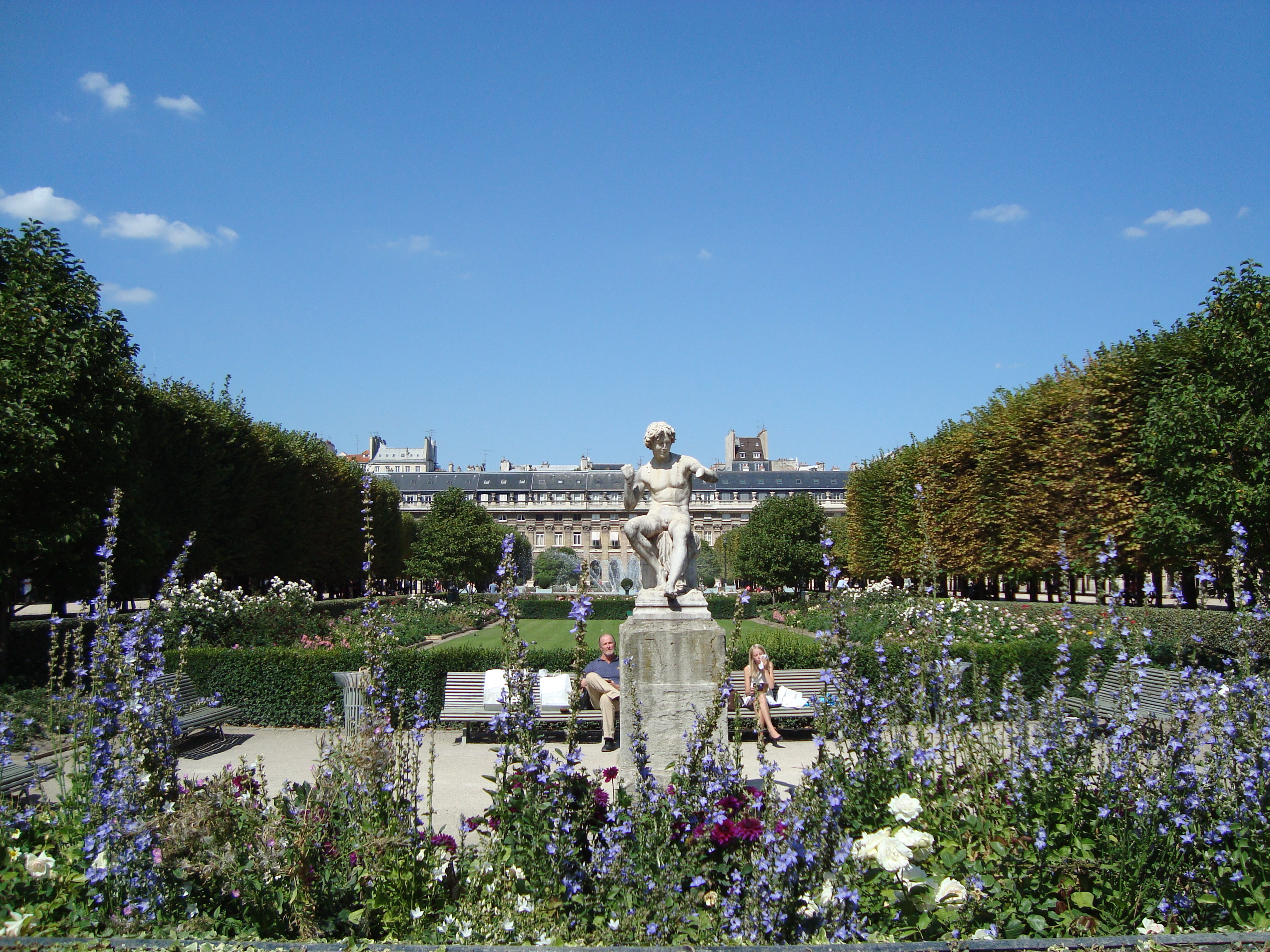
- The garden, with the galleries of the Palais-Royal around it
- Interactive map of Palais-Royal Garden
- Type: Public garden
- Location: 1st arrondissement of Paris, Paris, France
- Coordinates: 48.864983°N 2.337749°E
- Created: 1635–1636
- Operator: Centre des monuments nationaux
- Designation: Jardin remarquable (2005)
- Public transit: Palais Royal – Musée du Louvre (line 1, line 7)

The Palais-Royal Garden (French: jardin du Palais-Royal) is a public garden in the centre of the Palais-Royal, in the 1st arrondissement of Paris. Made in 1635–1636, it has held the French Ministry of Culture's jardin remarquable ("remarkable garden") label since 2005.

== Location and access ==
The garden is enclosed by four galleries with arcades: the Galerie de Montpensier to the west, the Galerie de Beaujolais to the north, the Galerie de Valois to the east and the Galerie du Jardin to the south. The nearest Métro station is Palais Royal – Musée du Louvre, on lines 1 and 7.

== History ==
Cardinal Richelieu had the garden made to set off his palace. It was designed by the king's gardener Pierre Desgots and made in the winter of 1635–1636. According to the Ministry of Culture's register of remarkable gardens, it measured 350 by 150 metres, with rows of chestnut trees along the sides, six embroidery parterres and basins set with marble and bronze statues, and it was open to the public from the start. Hillairet describes Desgots's garden with two large basins with fountains, statues and embroidery parterres, two walks of elms round it and a small wood closing the far end, freely open to the public. The first garden of the Palais-Cardinal, as the palace was then called, covered a much larger area than the present Palais-Royal, and the ground was then almost open country. On the cardinal's death the palace and garden passed to Louis XIII, and the royal family moved in. From 1674, after Louis XIV had given the palace to his brother Philippe d'Orléans, André Le Nôtre began to transform the garden. The central basin and the parterres were made between 1817 and 1824. In 1992 the landscape architect Mark Rudkin redesigned the flower beds around the basin, keeping the eighteenth-century layout of two large parterres and rows of trees.

In February 2019 two of the walks were named after Colette and Jean Cocteau, who had both lived at the Palais-Royal: the allée Cocteau on the Rue de Montpensier side and the allée Colette on the Rue de Valois side, each marked by an enamelled plaque. At the same time eighteen "poem benches" by the Quebec sculptor Michel Goulet, each carrying a line by Colette, Cocteau or another writer, were set up in the walks.

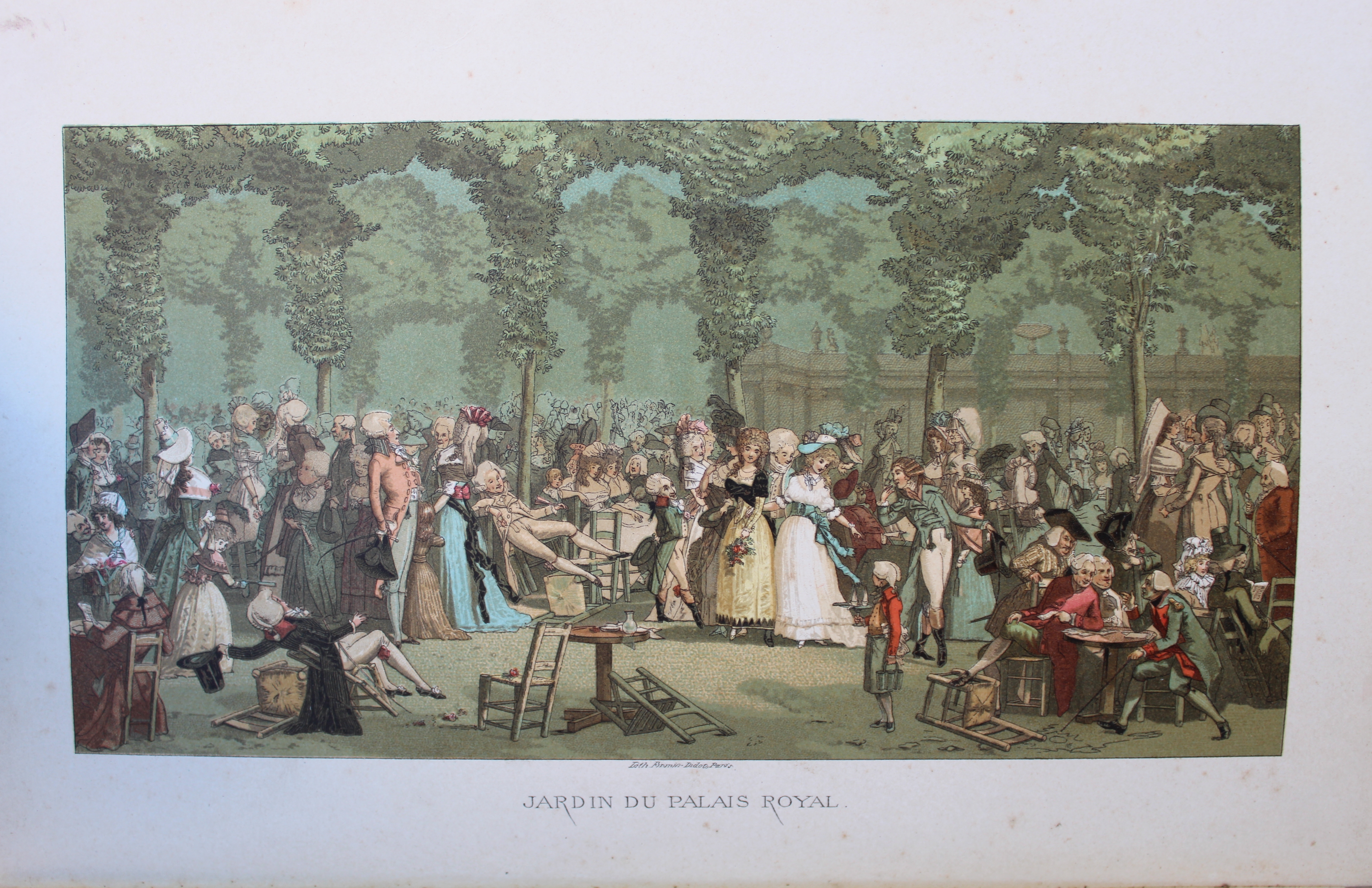
The garden about 1790, engraved by Firmin Didot

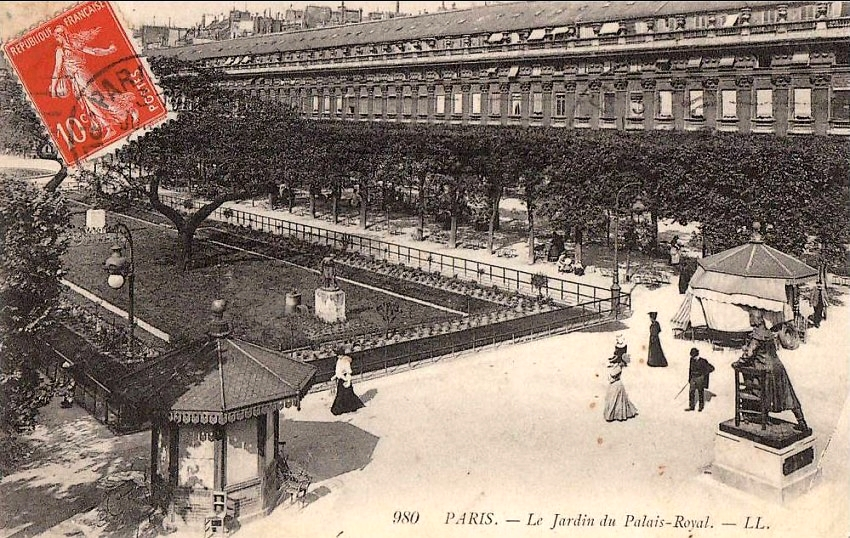
The garden about 1910, with the statue of Camille Desmoulins

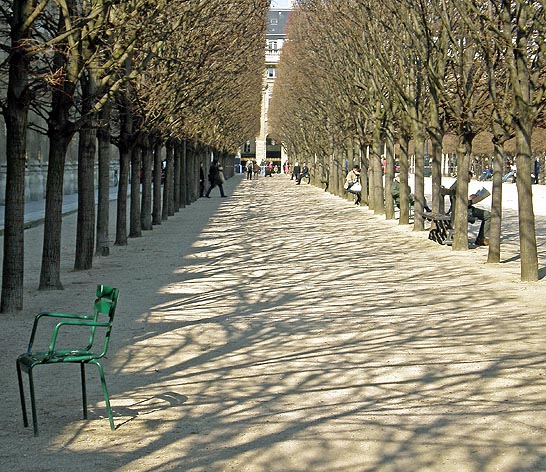
A walk in the garden

== Statues ==
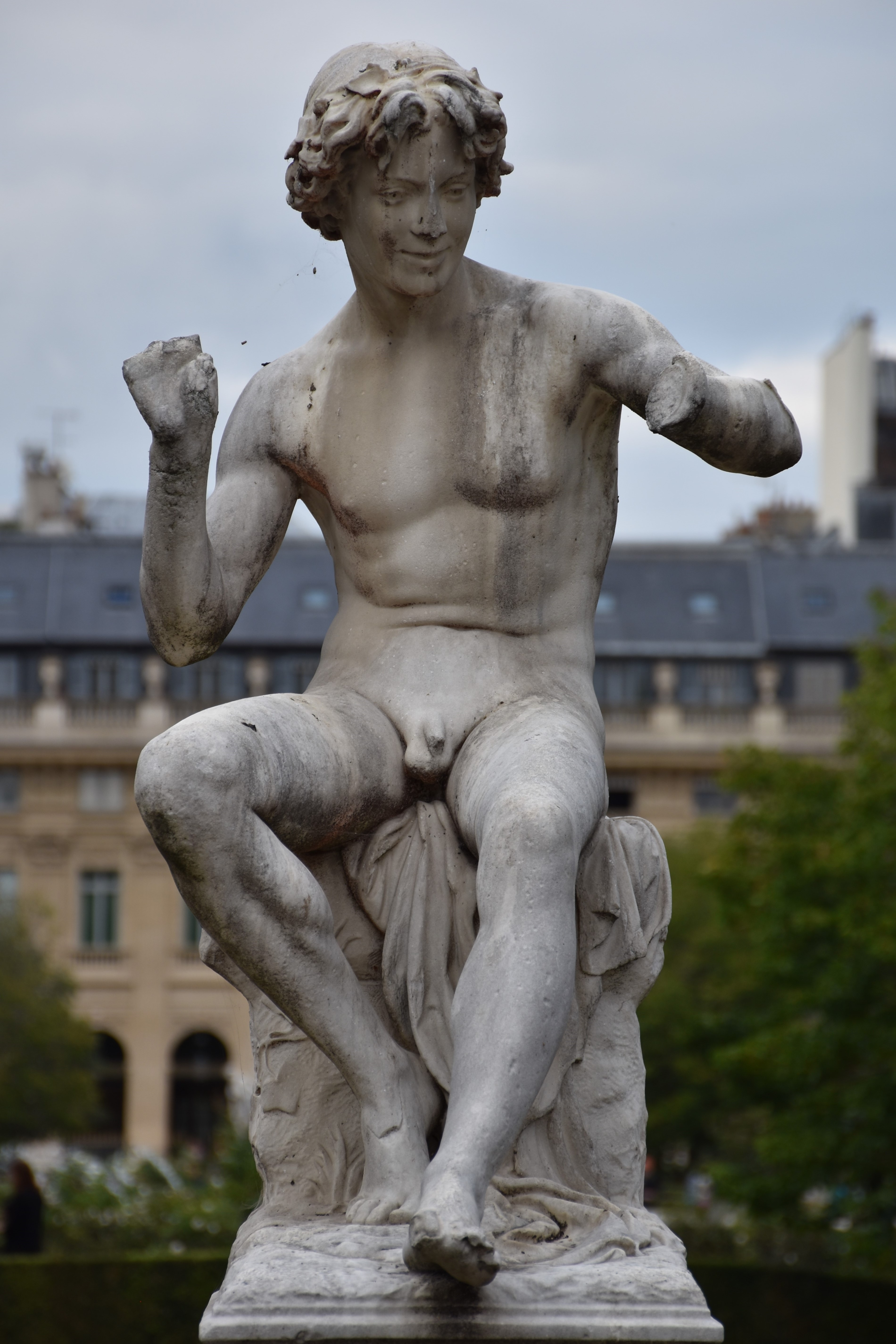
The Snake Charmer by Adolphe Thabard (1875)

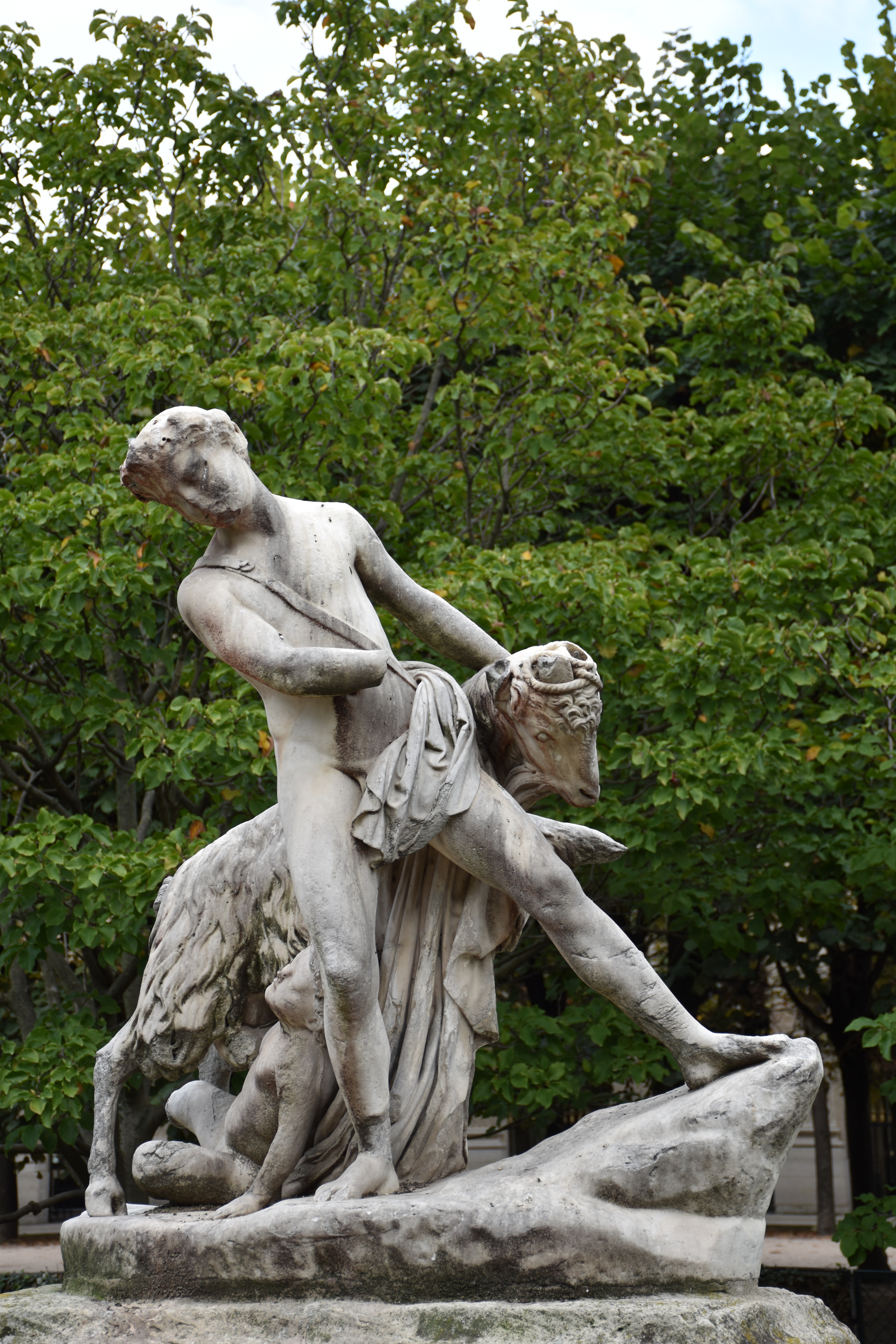
The Shepherd and the Goat by Paul Lemoyne (1830)

Between 1900 and 1945 the garden had several statues, besides those listed here, that have since gone. Only two remain:

- The Snake Charmer (Le Charmeur de serpent) by Adolphe Thabard, set up in 1875, in poor condition;
- The Shepherd and the Goat (Le Pâtre et la Chèvre), a group by Paul Lemoyne, about 1830, in poor condition;
- a marble Monument to Victor Hugo by Auguste Rodin, set up in 1909 and now in the Musée Rodin;
- a bronze statue of Camille Desmoulins by Eugène-Jean Boverie, set up in 1905, taken down and melted in 1942 in the requisition of non-ferrous metals;

In the courtyard of honour, before the entrance to the garden, Les Deux Plateaux, the columns of Daniel Buren, are located.

== The little cannon ==
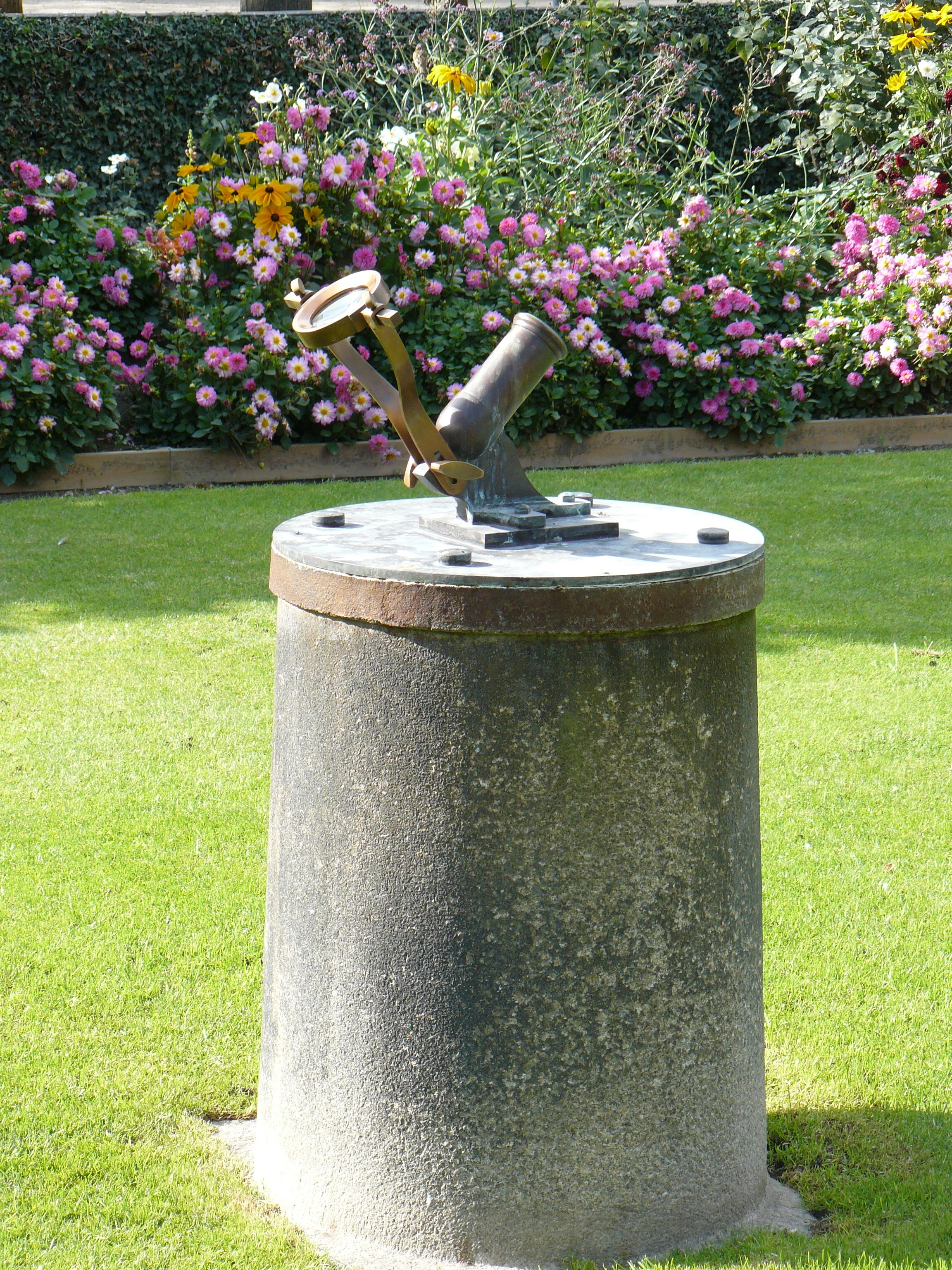
The little cannon in 2009

A small bronze sundial cannon stands on a granite post in the garden, on the line of the Paris meridian. A man named Rousseau set it up in 1786. Rousseau was a clockmaker and maker of mathematical instruments with a shop in the Galerie de Beaujolais; he devised the cannon in 1785, and it was placed opposite his shop by order of the Duke of Orléans. A lens set in the meridian focused the sun's rays on the powder and fired the charge at true noon, on sunny days from May to October. Parisians set their watches by it. The poet Jacques Delille wrote of the garden that if people's morals went wrong there, at least they could set their watches. The Latin motto on its base, Horas non numero nisi serenas, means "I count only the serene hours". The cannon was moved away and then, in 1799, brought back to its earlier place, in the middle of the lawn at the south end of the garden, where it still stands.

In 1882 the astronomer A. Lepaute wrote in L'Astronomie that crowds still waited around the cannon at noon every day for the shot, and that it had fired through the Reign of Terror, the wars of the Grande Armée, the Restoration, the reign of Louis-Philippe, the days of 1848, the Empire and the Commune. But the cannon gives true solar time, and its shot had long ceased to be the official time of Paris. Under the First Empire people were still content with the time given by the cannon; in 1816 the prefect of the Seine, Gaspard de Chabrol, had the public clocks of the capital set to mean solar time, after asking the Bureau des Longitudes for a report, and according to François Arago the change passed unnoticed. A law of 14 March 1891 replaced local mean time throughout France with Paris time, which the railways already used. A law of 9 March 1911 then set legal time back by 9 minutes and 21 seconds, which brought France to Greenwich Mean Time without naming it. The cannon fell silent that year.

The cannon was restored in 1990 and fired again at noon until the Vigipirate security plan stopped it. It was stolen in 1998 and replaced by a replica. In 2011 the Ministry of Culture decided to give it back its function, without the solar ignition: a pyrotechnician now fires it every Wednesday at noon.

== Other features ==
A small Wallace fountain stands in the garden.

A commemorative plaque in the Galerie de Valois, placed on 15 December 1934 by the Czechoslovak colony of France, records that "from here, on 22 August 1914, the Czechoslovak volunteers set out to defend, at France's side, the liberty of nations and to recover national independence". In the first weeks of the war the members of two Czech associations of Paris, the Sokol of Paris and the socialist association Rovnost ("Equality"), had asked to join the French Foreign Legion and had drilled in the garden. On 22 August 1914 they gathered there to offer their help to the French authorities, and more than 350 Czech volunteers enlisted in the Legion for the duration of the war.

== In film ==
Films and series shot in the garden include Le Château de verre (1950) by René Clément, Charade (1963) by Stanley Donen, Le Grand Jeu (2015) by Nicolas Pariser, Mr. & Mrs. Adelman (2017) by Nicolas Bedos, the television series Baron Noir and Call My Agent! (2018), and Mission: Impossible – Fallout (2018) by Christopher McQuarrie.
