= Rue de Beaujolais =

Street in Paris, France

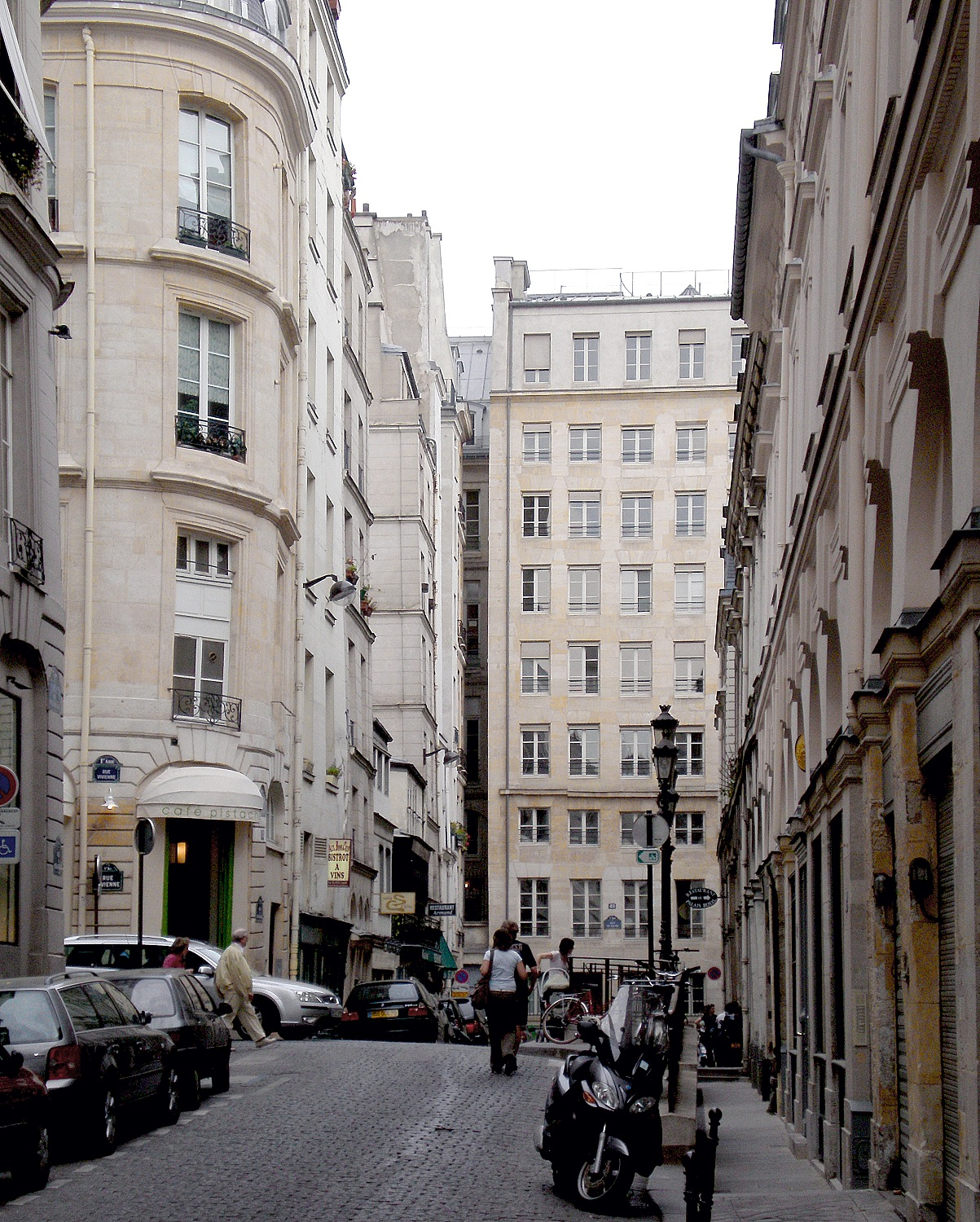

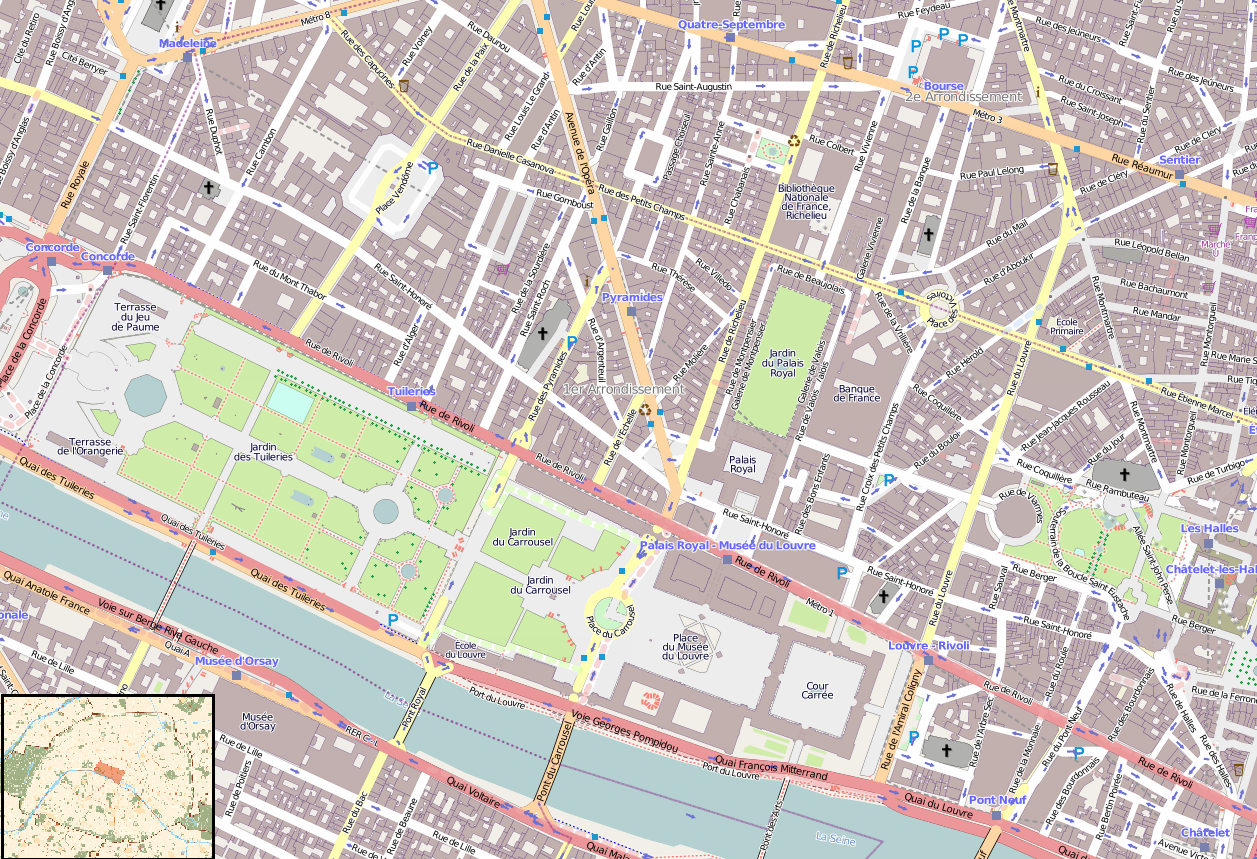
- Location within 1st arrondissement of Paris Location within Paris
- Former names: Passage de Beaujolais; Rue d'Arcole; Rue Hoche; Rue de Beaujolais-Palais-Royal
- Type: Street
- Length: 128 m (420 ft)
- Width: 8.78 m
- Location: Paris, France
- Arrondissement: 1st arrondissement
- Quarter: Palais-Royal
- Coordinates: 48.866126°N 2.33858°E
- From: 43, rue de Valois
- To: 38, rue de Montpensier

The Rue de Beaujolais (French pronunciation: [ʁy də boʒɔlɛ]) is a street in the 1st arrondissement of Paris, France.

== Location ==
The 128-meter-long street has an approximately east-west orientation. It starts at the Rue de Valois and ends at the Rue de Montpensier. The vehicles can drive from west to east only.

It is equally distant from Métro stations Bourse (Line 3) and Palais Royal – Musée du Louvre (Lines 1 and 7).

== History ==
The street was named after Louis Charles, Count of Beaujolais, the son of Louis Philippe II, Duke of Orléans.

The street was established in 1784 on a part of the former Palais-Royal Garden when the Duke of Orléans had the stone galleries built. At this time, the street was named the Passage de Beaujolais.

Between 1797 and 1814, the street took the name Rue d'Arcole to commemorate the Battle of Arcole. In 1849, it was briefly named Rue Hoche after General of the Revolutionary Lazare Hoche.

Until the mid-19th century, the street was called Rue de Beaujolais-Palais-Royal several times to distinguish it from the other streets with similar names, like the Rue de Beaujolais-Saint-Honoré (disestablished 1852) and the Rue de Beaujolais-au-Marais.

== Remarkable buildings ==
- No. 3: entry of the Beaujolais Peristyle that leads to the Palais-Royal Garden.
- No. 5: Milord l'Arsouille cabaret.
- Between nos. 7 and 9: Passage du Perron that leads to Galerie de Beaujolais inside the Palais-Royal.
- No. 9:
  - site of the former bookshop of Thomas Aurore Armand Martainville-Delaage, opened in 1812, known as the Cercle encyclopédique or Cercle littéraire encyclopédique.
  - former residence of Colette (1873–1954) and her third husband Maurice Goudeket (1889-1977), from 1927 to 1929 and from 1938 to 1954. After Goudeket was freed in February 1942, he hid there until the end of the War.
  - former residence of Suzanne Spaak (1905–1944).
- No. 15: Jean Cocteau stayed there in December 1939 before he left for Perpignan.
- No. 17: Le Grand Véfour, an old restaurant led by chef Guy Martin. Napoléon Bonaparte, Joséphine de Beauharnais, Victor Hugo and Colette were regular guests.
- No. 18: former site of the nightclub Whisky à Gogo opened in 1947. Régine worked there.
- No. 19: Peristyle of Joinville, that leads to the Palais-Royal Garden.
- No. 20: façade of a restaurant adorned with two putti.
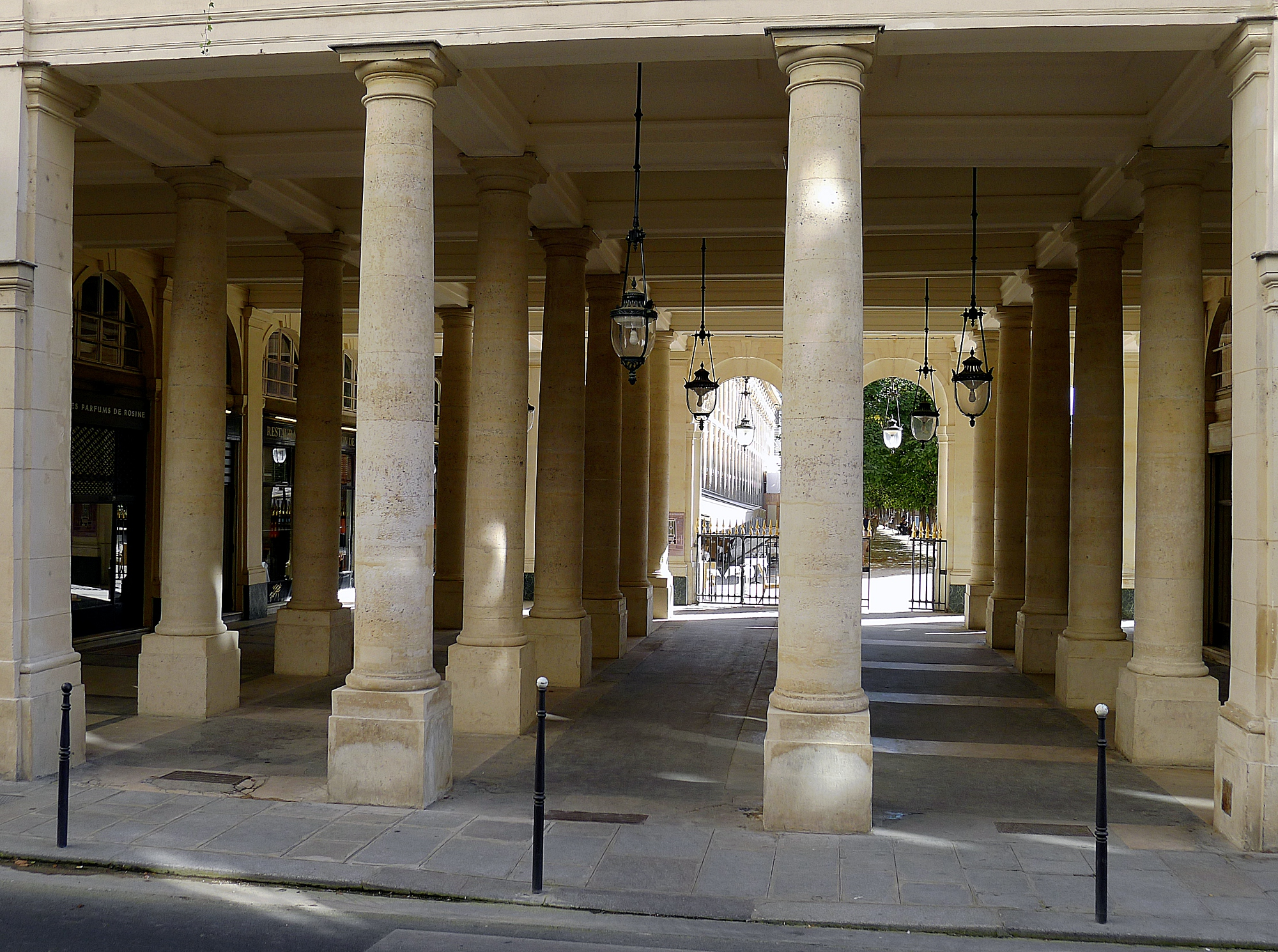
No. 3, Beaujolais Peristyle

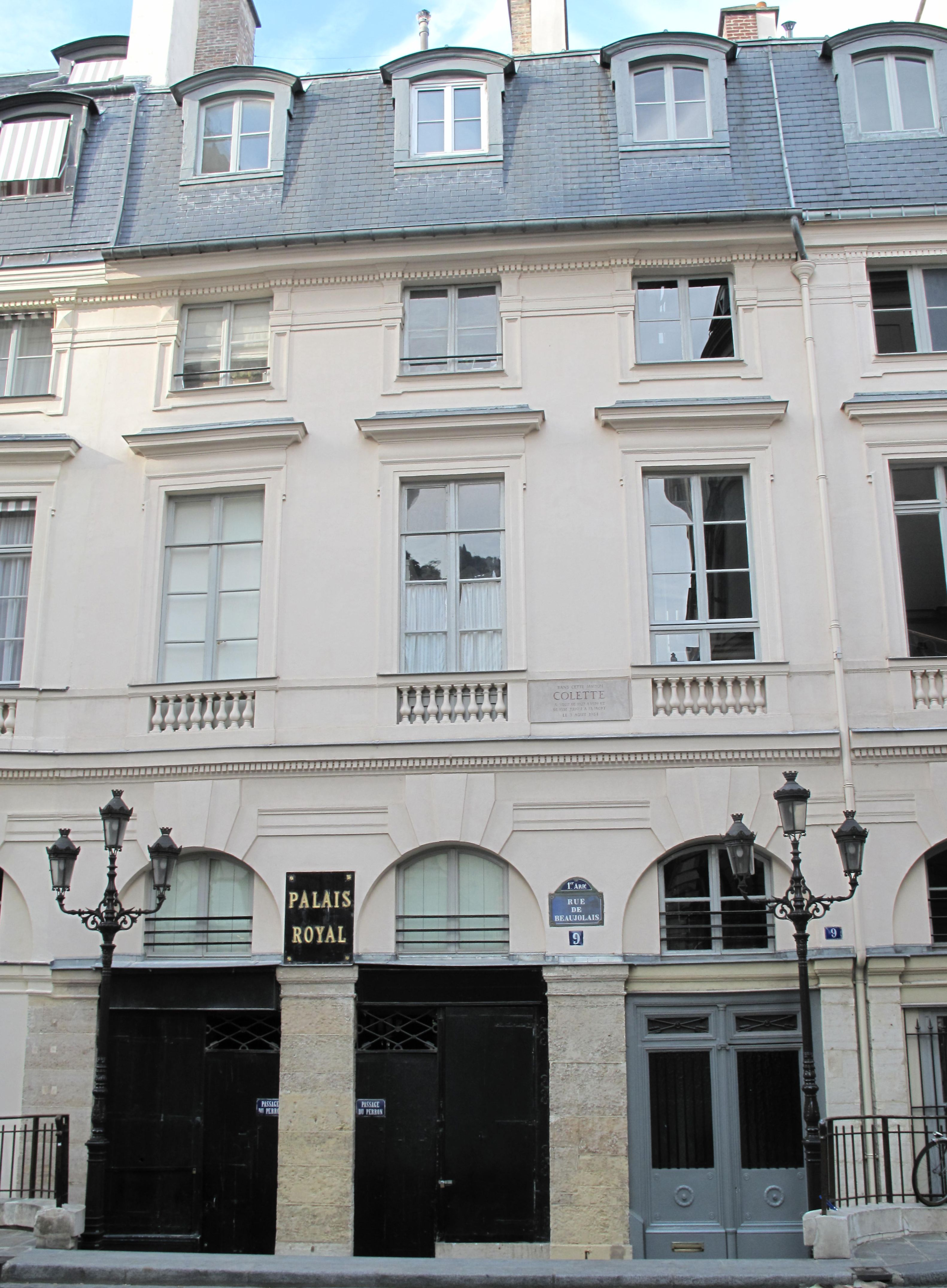
No. 9, Colette's residence

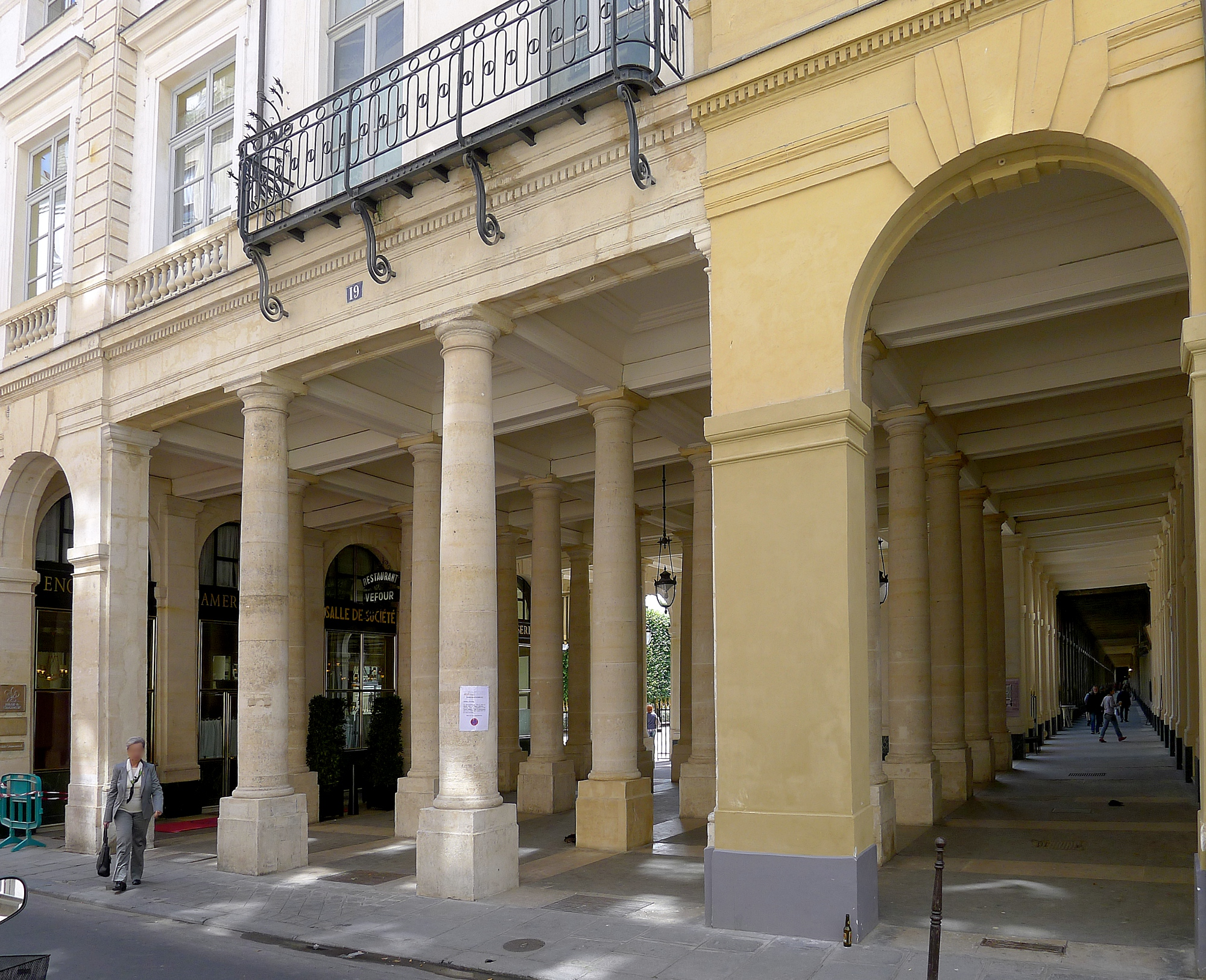
No. 17 (restaurant Le Grand Véfour) and no. 19 (Joinville Peristyle and Galerie de Montpensier)

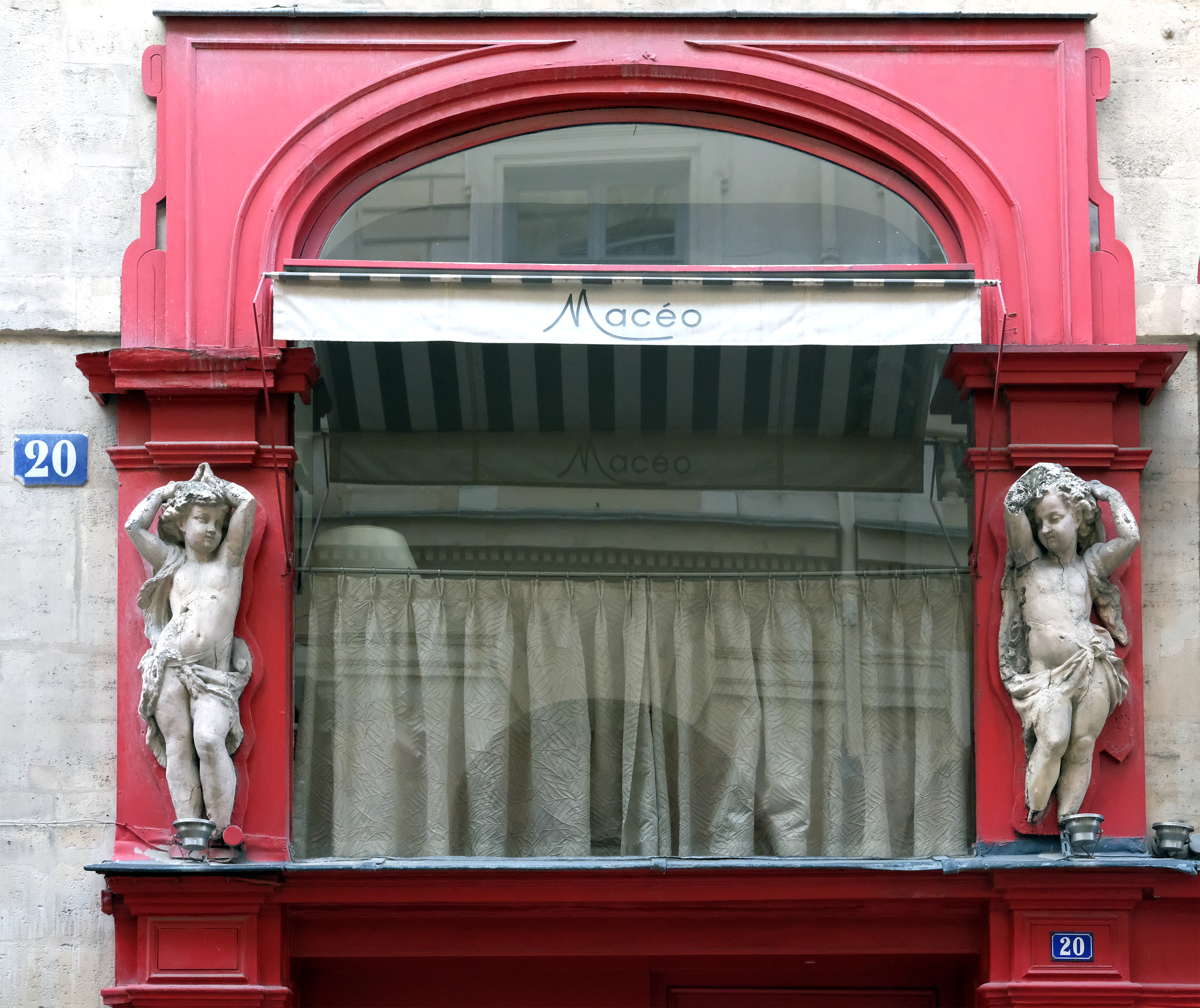
No. 20: restaurant façade with putti

== See also ==
- List of streets in the 1st arrondissement of Paris
