= Pierre I Desgots =

French gardener

Pierre I Desgots (c. 1600 – 1675) was a French gardener who helped to maintain and create French formal gardens at the Tuileries and the Palais-Cardinal in Paris. He was the brother-in-law of the famous French garden designer André Le Nôtre and the grandfather of the landscape architect Claude Desgots.

== Family ==
Pierre I Desgots was born in Paris around 1600. He was the son of Jean I Desgots, a plaster merchant. His older sister Marie Desgots (died 1675) married Martin Bocquet, a gardener at the Cours-la-Reine, a promenade created by Queen Marie de' Medici along the Seine. His older brother Jean II Desgots (died 1624) is recorded in a contract of 2 October 1616 as maître jardinier ('master gardener') and an associate of Jean Le Nôtre, father of André Le Nôtre, at the garden of the Maison Feydeau, Rue des Francs-Bourgeois. From 1618, Jean II Desgots was jardinier du roi ('gardener of the king') at the Tuileries. Pierre I Desgots married Elisabeth (Ysabel) Le Nôtre, sister of André Le Nôtre, on 10 February 1625. The couple had a son, Pierre II Desgots (1630–1688), who also became a gardener and worked closely with André Lenôtre. After the death of Pierre I's wife in 1632, the inventory of her belongings listed garden tools and flowers, but no books. The flowers included anemones, tulips, white and yellow daffodils, jonquils, crocuses, Persian tulips, hepatics, and buttercups, among others. Pierre I and his son resided on the Rue Saint-Vincent (now the Rue Saint-Roch) in the parish of Saint-Roch, Paris. In 1654, Pierre II married Martine Servelle (died 1670), and the couple had a son, Claude Desgots, who became an internationally famous landscape architect.

== Career ==
Following in the footsteps of his older brother Jean, Pierre I Desgots became a maître jardinier. He was probably employed in the maintenance of the garden created in 1608–1610 by Jean Le Nôtre at the Parisian hôtel of Cardinal François de La Rochefoucauld. After the death of his brother Jean in 1624, Pierre succeeded him as jardinier ordinaire du roi at the Tuileries, where he received wages of 1200 livres for maintaining the palisades and alleys of the garden and park of the Tuileries and probably later created new alleys there in 1668–1670, when the garden was redesigned by André Le Nôtre.

In 1629, he purchased an arpent of land in Ville l'Évêque with Simon Bouchard, gardener of the orangery of the Tuileries and the son-in-law of Jean Le Nôtre, and later built a house there. That same year, Jean Le Nôtre, Bouchard and Desgots created flower and boxwood parterres en broderie to a design by Jacques Boyceau at the Palais-Cardinal in Paris. On 18 November 1635, Desgots agreed to a contract for 1500 livres to level alleys and plant hornbeam in the same garden.

== Bibliography ==
- Bouchenot-Déchin, Patricia (2013). André Le Nôtre (in French). Fayard. ISBN 9782213676227 (ebook).
- Garrigues, Dominique (2001). Jardins et jardiniers de Versailles au grand siècle. Seyssel: Champ Vallon. ISBN 9782876733374.
- Hazlehurst, F. Hamilton (1980). Gardens of Illusion: The Genius of André Le Nostre. Nashville, Tennessee: Vanderbilt University Press. ISBN 9780826512093.
- Rostaing, Aurélia (2001). "Pierre II Desgots (1630–1688) et Claude Desgots (v. 1658 – 1732)", pp. 72–75, in Créaturs de jardins et de paysages en France de la Renaissance au XXIe siècle. Tome I: de la Renaissance au début du XIXe siècle, edited by Michel Racine. École nationale supérieure du paysage. ISBN 2742732802.
