= Galerie de Montpensier =

Gallery in Paris, France

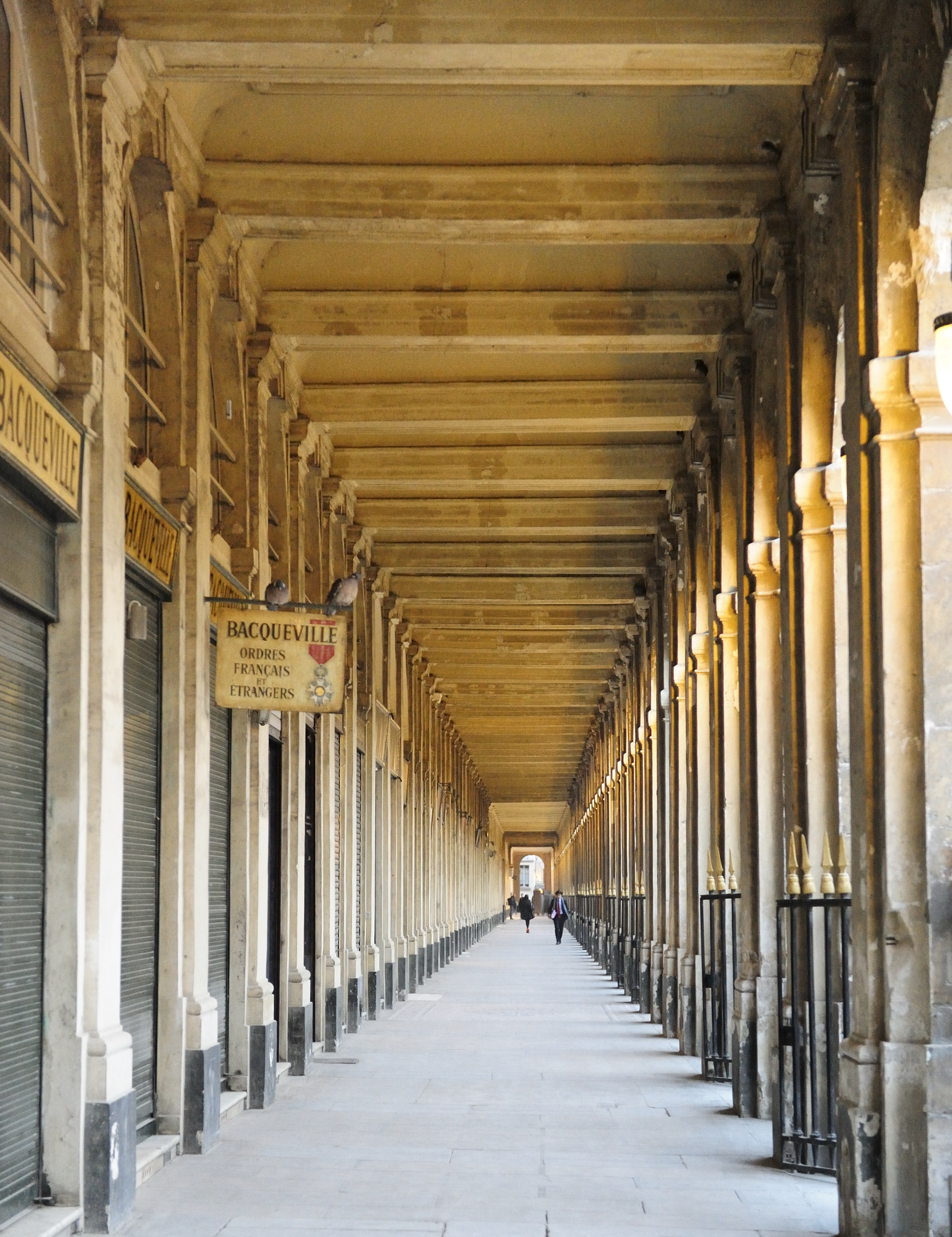
- In 2012

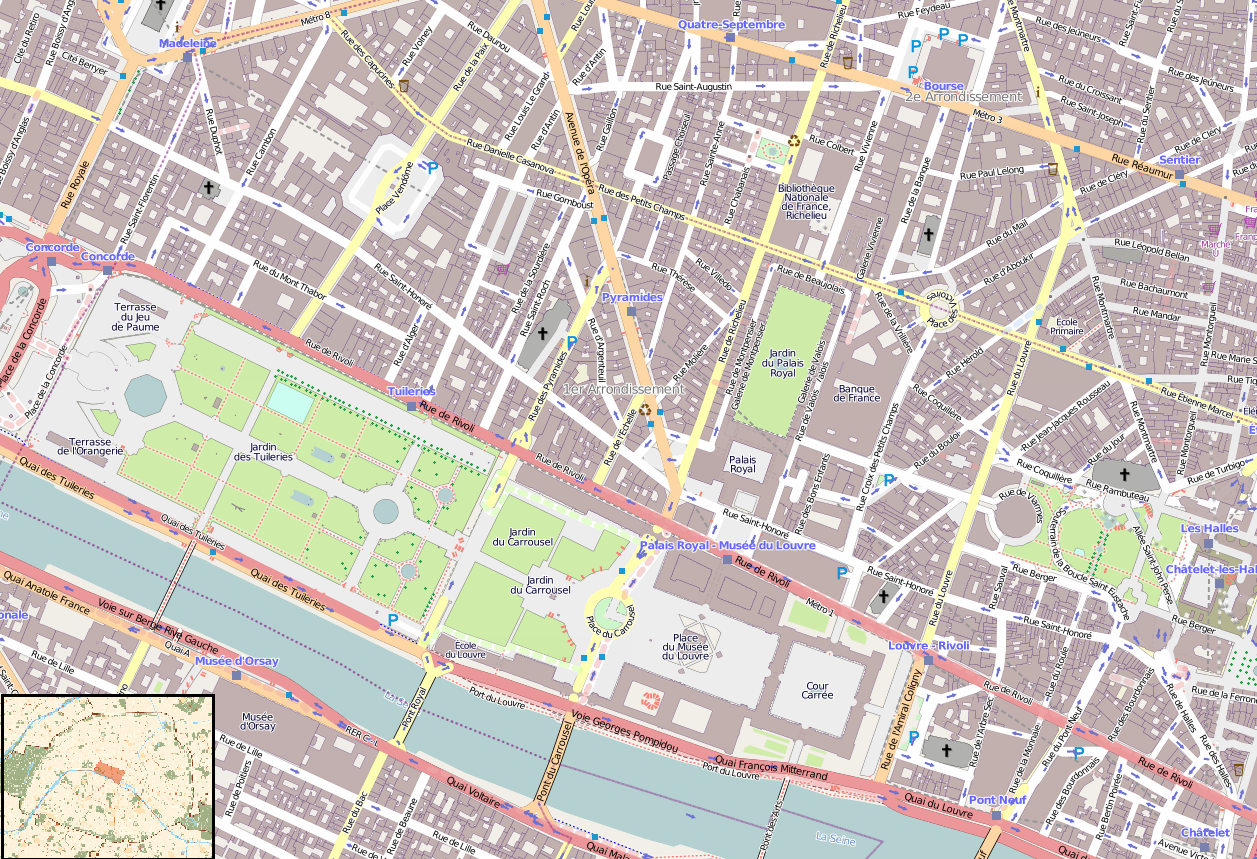
- Location within 1st arrondissement of Paris Location within Paris
- Former names: Galerie Montpensier; Galerie des Combats
- Type: Gallery
- Length: 227 m (745 ft)
- Width: 4.4 m
- Location: Paris, France
- Arrondissement: 1st arrondissement
- Quarter: Palais-Royal
- Coordinates: 48.865435°N 2.337416°E
- From: Montpensier Peristyle
- To: Joinville Peristyle

The Galerie de Montpensier is a gallery in the Palais-Royal in the 1st arrondissement of Paris, France.

== Description ==
The Galerie de Montpensier is one of the galleries with arcades located inside the Palais-Royal. It runs along the western side of the Palais-Royal Garden. It starts at Montpensier Peristyle and ends at Joinville Peristyle.

A passageway starts from the gallery and ends at 24–25 Rue de Montpensier.

== Name ==
The name of the gallery derives from the proximity of the Rue de Montpensier, which was named after Antoine Philippe, Duke of Montpensier, the brother of King Louis Philippe I.

The gallery was originally named Galerie Montpensier. It was renamed Galerie des Combats in 1840, before it took its current name.

== Notable buildings ==
- During the French Revolution, the Café Corazza hosted the Society of the Friends of the Constitution before it chose to gather at the Couvent des Jacobins on the Rue Saint-Honoré. A ballroom named Pince-Cul was located in the underground floor.
- Nos. 57–60: The Café de Foy opened there in 1784 and remained there until its closure in 1863.
- Nos. 51–52: clockmaker Charles Oudin settled there in 1845.
- Nos. 48–50: Alfred Hamel founded its jeweller's, goldsmith's and clockmaker's house there in 1879.
