= Château de Sablé =

Castle in Sarthe, Pays de la Loire, France

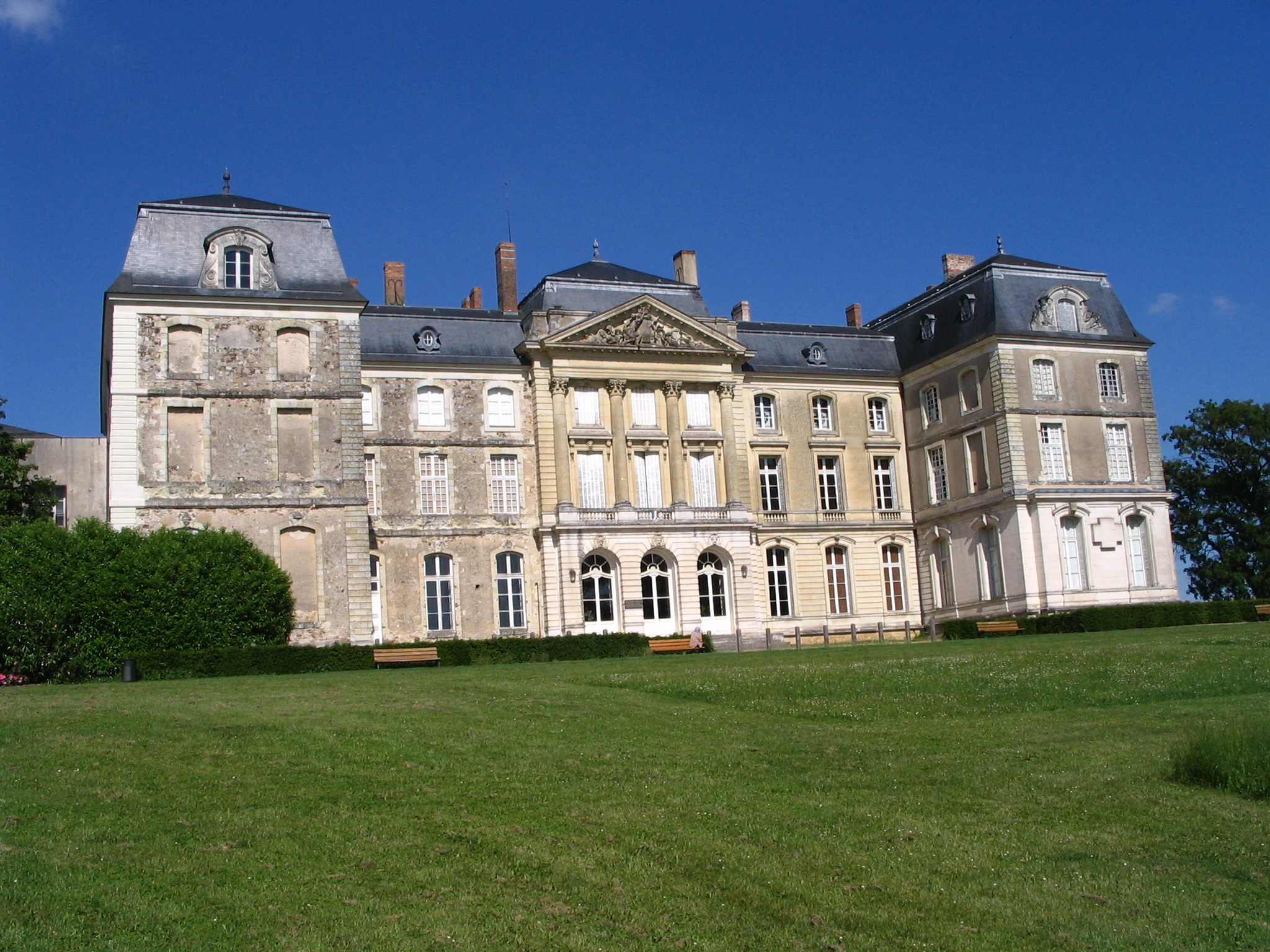
- Château de Sablé in 2009

- Location within France

General information
- Coordinates: 47°50′17″N 0°19′58″W

The Château de Sablé is an historic castle in Sablé-sur-Sarthe, Sarthe, Pays de la Loire, France.

== History ==
The castle was built from 1717 to 1750 to the design of architect Claude Desgots for Jean-Baptiste Colbert, Marquess of Torcy. Its grounds are bordered by the Vaige river. By the 19th century, it belonged to the Duke of Chaulnes.

It was a chicory factory from 1919 to 1960.

It was acquired by the city of Sablé-sur-Sarthe in 1960. Since 1979, it has been home to the Centre technique de conservation Joël-le-Theule of the Bibliothèque nationale de France, named in honour of local politician Joël Le Theule.

== Architectural significance ==
It has been listed as an official monument since 1983.
