= Charles Oudin =

French horology company

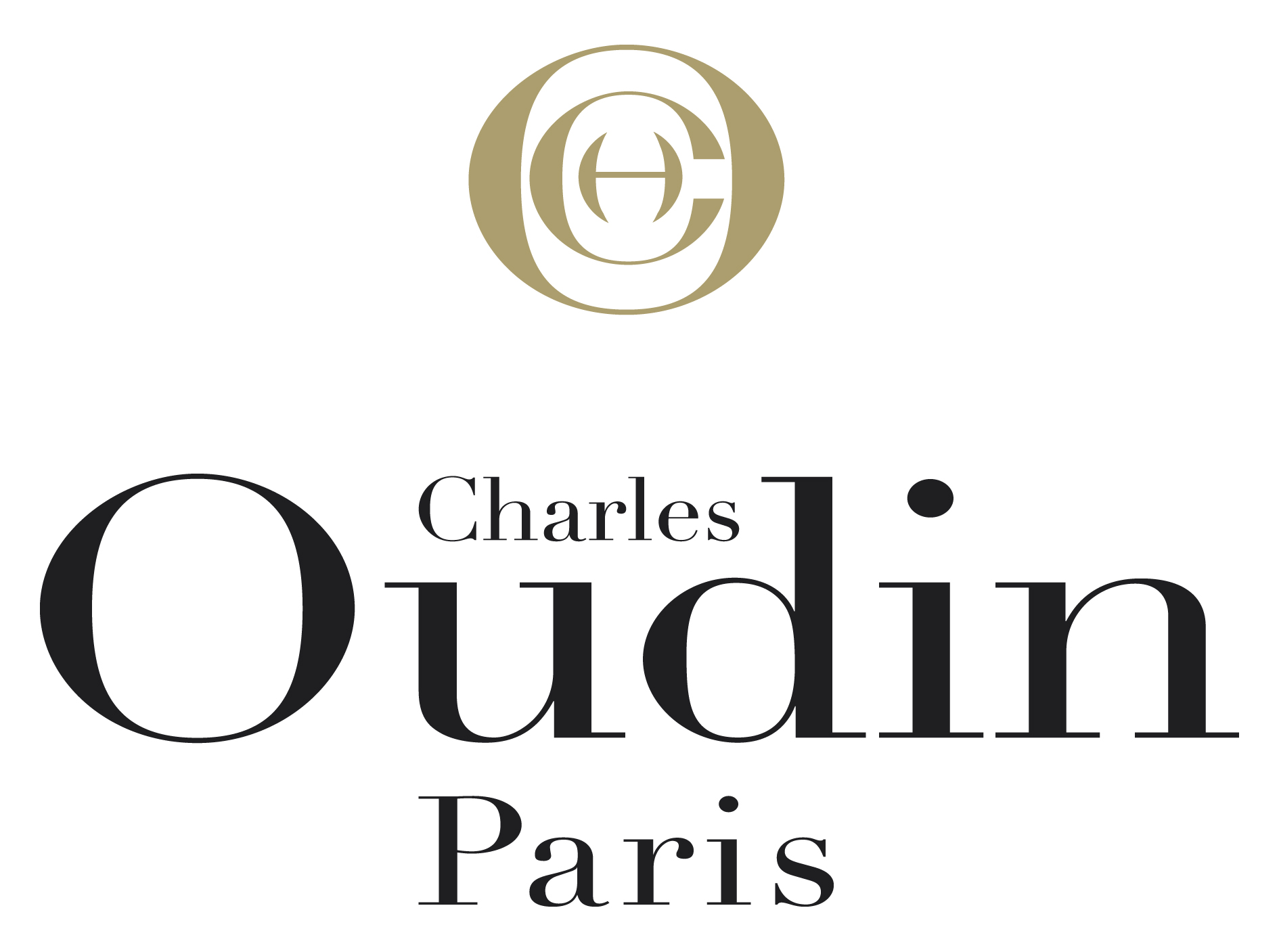
- Founded: 1797
- Founder: Charles Oudin
- Headquarters: 8, Place Vendôme, 75001, Paris, France
- Products: Watches, jewellery watches, jewellery
- Owner: Camille Berthet
- Website: http://www.oudin.com

Charles Oudin is the oldest French horology firm. It was founded in Paris at the end of the 18th century by Jean-Charles (known as Charles) Oudin, who came from a family of clockmakers in Northwest France. There were four generations of Oudins who were clockmakers, as of the mid 18th century, first in the Meuse region and later, in Paris. Several members of the Oudin family worked for the master watch and clockmaker Abraham-Louis Breguet.

Charles Oudin, the best known member of this horological dynasty, established his business toward the end of the 18th century, devoting himself to luxury and precision clocks and watches. The first watches signed "Charles Oudin, élève de Breguet" (Charles Oudin, student of Breguet) date from 1797. In 1805 he made a repeating à tact watch for Empress Josephine[1]. Taking part in the important exhibitions of the period, he attracted notice; at the Exhibition of the products of French Industry in 1806, he received an Honourable Mention for a self-winding watch [2]; at the 1819 Exhibition of the products of French Industry, he received a Citation for an equation watch [3].

== In Breguet's Entourage ==
The Oudin family, which came from Northwest France, produced several renowned watchmakers. The first of these, Jean Baptiste Oudin, came from Clermont en Argonne (Meuse); his sons Nicolas and Charles (here called "Charles the elder") both became watch and clockmakers, as did their sons after them. While Charles Oudin the elder (1743–1803) remained all his life in Sedan (Ardennes), becoming the mayor of that city in 1794, he also worked for the famous watchmaker Abraham-Louis Breguet; he appears in the Breguet account books as "Oudin père" (Oudin the father).

Charles Oudin the elder and his brother Nicolas each had a son who became a watchmaker, and both were employed in the Paris workshop of Abraham-Louis Breguet (1747–1823), considered the creator of modern horology. Breguet held the Oudin cousins - Charles, (the son of Nicolas, 1768–1840) and Joseph, (the son of Charles Oudin the elder (1773 - circa 1842) -in high esteem. During the time they spent in his workshop, they took part in the creation and production of several of his important inventions, from the simple souscription watch to the most elaborate "perpétuelles", or self-winding watches.

The best known and most prolific of the two cousins, however, was Charles. Charles Oudin developed a clever equation of time system that could be adapted to Breguet "souscription" watches, allowing them to indicate both true, or solar, time, and mean time, which is used in everyday life.

When Breguet fled France during the French Revolution, taking refuge in Switzerland, Charles Oudin (known as "Oudin Sedan" in the Breguet account books) helped his assistant, Boulanger, continue to run the workshop. Abraham-Louis Breguet respected him greatly, and went so far as to offer him the position of head of the workshop, which Oudin politely refused. Breguet also gave him permission - which he very rarely gave - to sign his watches "Charles Oudin, élève de Breguet" (Charles Oudin, student of Breguet). Oudin's watches are, indeed, on a par with those of his master.

== Charles Oudin in the Palais-Royal ==
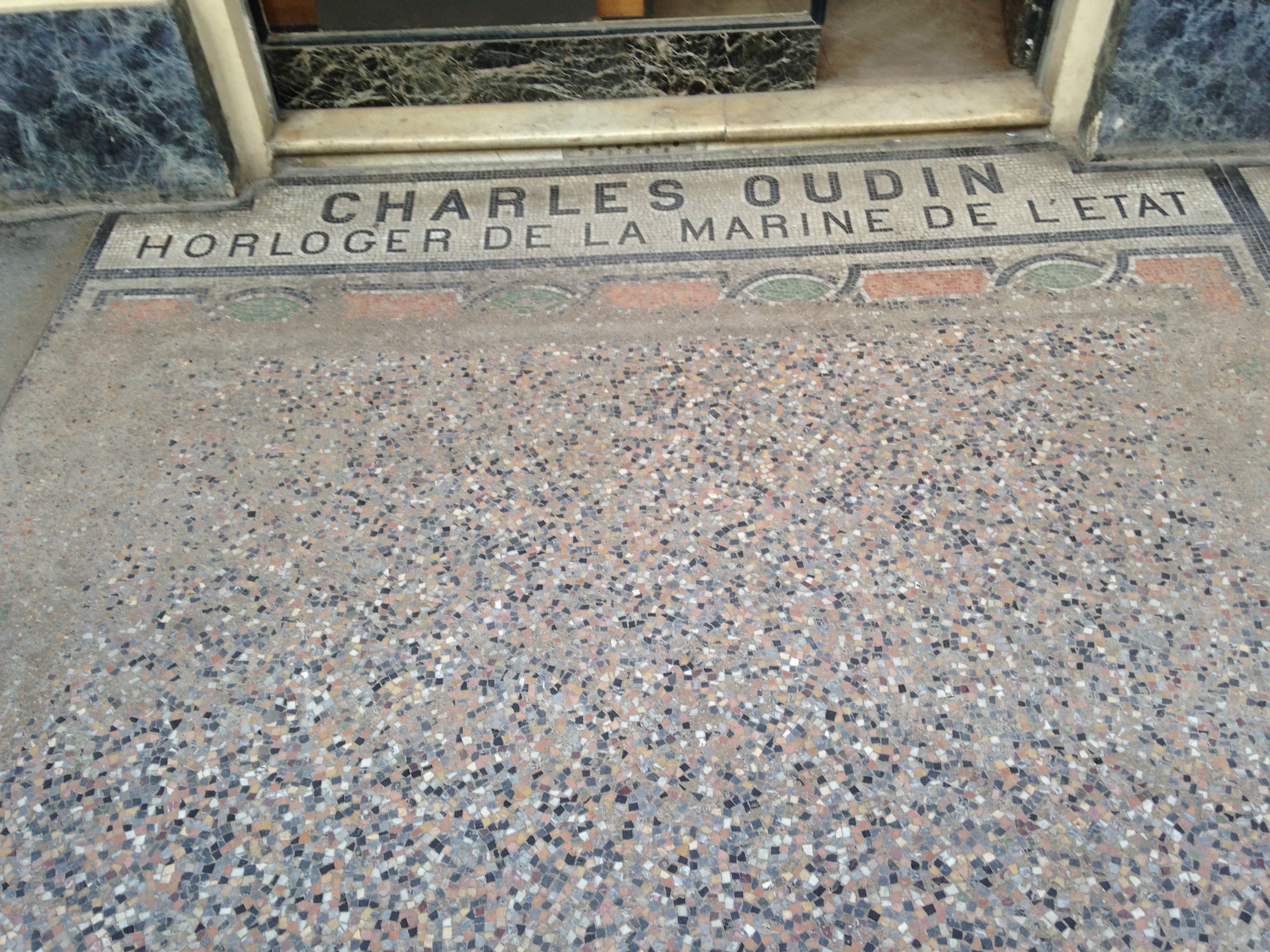
Mosaic floor in front of former Charles Oudin boutique, Palais Royal, Paris

In 1801 Charles Oudin opened a workshop in the Palais-Royal, one of Paris's more fashionable areas at the time. Given to the Duke d'Orléans by his brother Louis XIV in 1692, it remained in the hands of the Orléans family. In 1780, Louis-Philippe d'Orléans, the future Philippe Egalité, created a complex of buildings with decorative colonnades, shops, cafés, and a circus. Having become a popular centre for entertainment and romantic rendez-vous, the Palais Royal also featured many elegant and exclusive shops. In this central and fashionable Parisian neighbourhood, Charles Oudin's first shop was located in the Galerie de Pierre, no 65.

In 1809, Charles Oudin's address is given as number 52, rue de Richelieu, Palais du Tribunat[4]. Today, passers-by can still admire the mosaic in the pavement, announcing his name and title "Horloger de la Marine française" (Clockmaker to the French Navy).

Charles Oudin remained in the same area all of his life, although his addresses changed slightly: Galerie de Pierre, 52 (in 1811)[5]; Palais Royal, 52 (in 1812)[6]; and Palais Royal, Galerie Montpensier, 52, in 1845[7].

In 1797 Charles Oudin married Antoinette Leroy, the sister of another famous watchmaker, Basile-Charles Leroy. They had a son named Charles Raymond (d. 1867), and a daughter, Elzire Marguerite. On 30 June 1836 Charles Oudin ceded his commerce to his son Charles Raymond, who continued his father's activity.

In 1899, the company moved to 17, avenue de l'Opéra. At that time it was run by Amédée Charpentier.

Throughout its history, Charles Oudin remained faithful to Paris's historic centre; the firm's workshops and boutiques were located, successively, in the Palais Royal, the avenue de l'Opéra, and today, in the Place Vendôme.

== Oudin-Charpentier ==
Around 1857 Charles-Raymond sold the Charles Oudin firm to a watchmaker named Amédée Charpentier. Charpentier continued to produce watches and clocks under the name "Oudin-Charpentier", located first in the Palais Royal, no. 52 and then in rue Montpensier, no. 30. During this period, the firm became internationally known, with shops or representatives in London and New York.

Amédée Charpentier became known for precision watches, complication watches, and luxury watches in particular. His clients included the King and Queen of Spain, Pope Pius IX, the Russian Czar and Czarina, the Kings of Italy and Greece, and Empress Josephine.

== Charles Oudin at the Exhibitions ==
The Charles Oudin firm took part in the important exhibitions of the time - the national Exhibitions of the Products of French Industry, and later the International Exhibitions that were among the most important events of the 19th century.

The company participated in the Exhibitions of the Products of French Industry in 1806 and 1819. In 1806, Charles Oudin was awarded a medal for a watch that was wound by the pendant - an exploit at the time. At the 1819 exhibition, the firm exhibited, among other things, an "equation watch with an ingenious system"[8] for which it was favourably cited.

Charles Oudin also took part in the International Exhibitions of London in 1862 and Paris in 1867.

For these two exhibitions, Oudin-Charpentier published catalogues that described in detail the pieces shown [9], [10]. Among them were the "Duchesse" clocks (Nos. 17 and 18, 1862); a rock crystal châtelaine and watch (No. 24, 1862); a pocket chronometer with remontoir and equation table (No. 47, 1862); a mantel regulator made for Emperor Napoleon III (No. 1, 1867); a mother-of-pearl watch ordered by the Czarina of Russia who gave it to Princess Dagmar, the wife of Czar Alexander III of Russia (No. 38, 1867); and a minute-repeating watch with remontoir and grande sonnerie, made for the Count de Villafranca (No. 55, 1867).

During this period Charles Oudin made many extraordinary watches for Europe's royal families. Among his clients were the Russian Czar and Czarina, the King and Queen of Spain, the King of Portugal, Empress Josephine, Napoleon III, the Count de Chambord, the King of Italy, the King of Greece, and Pope Pius IX.

== Precision and Technical Innovation ==
As indicated by its close ties with Abraham-Louis Breguet, from the beginning the Charles Oudin firm specialised in precision and technically innovative horology. Several watches and clocks testify to this:

- A travelling clock signed "Oudin à Sedan", made circa 1790, with Arnold's pivoted detent escapement and quarter repeat, whose case is similar to that of the clock Breguet delivered to Napoleon Bonaparte in 1798. - A "souscription" watch signed "Charles Oudin, Elève de Breguet, Palais Royal No. 65", with special escapement, made circa 1800; Charles Oudin developed a special mechanism for Breguet's souscription watches - A self-winding watch with "balançoire", whose cuvette is engraved "Inventée et exécutée par Ch. Oudin Elève de Breguet" (Invented and made by Ch. Oudin, student of Breguet), made for the 1806 Exhibition of the Products of French Industry (today in the Patek Philippe Museum in Geneva) - A self-winding watch, a pendant-wound watch [15], and a watch with moon phases and synodic months, which received medals at the 1806 Exhibition of the Products of French Industry - A watch with equation of time, which won a medal at the 1819 Exhibition of the Products of French Industry - A "souscription" watch [16] with equation of time, made circa 1820 - A small marine chronometer with special escapement, made circa 1830 - A watch with quarter repeat, grande and petite sonnerie and thermometer, made circa 1850 - A travelling clock with grande and petite sonnerie, moon phases, alarm, and special escapement, made in 1869 - An eight-day going watch with grande and petite sonnerie in passing and pendant winding, made for the Count de Chambord circa 1870

== Famous Clients ==
Throughout its existence, Charles Oudin had many famous and influential clients. At the 1862 Universal Exhibition, Oudin was cited as being the horologist of the French Emperor and Empress, the Pope, the King and Queen of Spain, and the Imperial Navy [17]. Among its well-known clients:

- Empress Josephine, for whom a repeating, à tact watch was made (i.e., which indicates the time silently, bemoans of touch-pieces), in 1805[18] - Queen Victoria, for whom Charles Oudin made a miniature watch circa 1840, which was called "Six Pence" due to its small size, comparable to that of a six-pence coin - Count d'Adhémar, for whom a pocket chronometer was made in 1859[19] - Count Komar, who purchased a pocket chronometer with a solid gold movement in 1860 - The King of Spain, for whom the Oudin firm made a small travelling clock with striking on the hour and quarter hour, a detached lever escapement, and chronometric adjustment [20] - Napoleon III for whom a mantel regulator was made in 1867 [21]

== Jewellery Watches, Parisian Style ==
Along with its precision and technical watches, Charles Oudin has made watches whose design and decoration were made by artisans of the French capital. Among them:

- A gold and enamel purse-shaped watch, whose cover was adorned with diamonds and a star set with amethysts and diamonds, made circa 1860 - Cruciform watches, the earliest of which date from 1859; one of these watches, which was set with diamonds, sapphires and rubies, was created for the Queen of Spain circa 1860 - A skeleton pendant watch in rock crystal, set with diamonds, with the motto "Dieu mon droit" in enamel cartouches on the watch face, made for the British royal family, shown at the 1862 Universal Exhibition of London - Around 1920, as watches worn on the wrist grew in popularity, Oudin offered its first wristwatches for gentlemen and ladies. Some of these watches, with gold or platinum cases, were decorated with precious stones such as emeralds, sapphires, pearls, and diamonds.

== In Museums ==
Today, many watches made by Charles Oudin made be seen in museums around the world. Among them :

- A gold "souscription" watch with an equation of time system invented by Charles Oudin, made circa 1825, in the Musée Paul Dupuy in Toulouse, France [22] - A large silver watch with two wheel duplex escapement, formerly in the Time Museum in Rockford, Illinois [23] - Two gold and enamel ladies' watches, made circa 1830, in the Metropolitan Museum in New York[24] - A small pendant watch with a long gold and pearl chain, made circa 1810, in the Bowes Museum in Barnard Castle, UK [25] - A mourning watch with châtelaine, and ebonite case, made circa 1860, in the British Museum in London [26] - A watch with châtelaine in the Hermitage Museum in Saint Petersburg - Two self-winding watches in the Patek Philippe Museum in Geneva - A watch in the Breguet Museum in Paris - A travelling clock with calendar, made circa 1865, in the Conservatoire National des Arts et Métiers in Paris[27]

== New Start ==
In 1998, Camille Berthet, who also came from a watchmaking family, took over the Charles Oudin brand. Today the firm produces mostly jewellery watches. The "Retro" and "Deco" collections were inspired by Art Deco watches from the early 20th century. The "Historique" collection, with gold and platinum complication watches, is evocative of the history of the firm, when Charles Oudin was Horologist to the French Navy. The "Curvex" collection, launched in 1999, comprises watches that are entirely set with precious stones, like a ring. The "Full Amazone" watch, now an emblem of the firm, was created in 2000.

Camille Berthet's two daughters, Claire and Carole, joined the company in 2005 and 2008 respectively.

== Bibliography ==
- Catalogue des principales pièces d'horlogerie exécutées par Charpentier-Oudin, Exposition universelle de Paris de 1867
- Jean-Claude Sabrier, Oudin - A horological dynasty closely linked to Breguet, VOX - The Antiquorum Magazine - 2007 Spring, pp. 116–125
- Jean-Claude Sabrier, Oudin part II, VOX - The Antiquorum Magazine - 2007 Summer, pp. 120–127

== Références ==
- Catalogue des objets principaux de l'exposition Oudin-Charpentier, London Universal Exhibition, 1862, n° 48
- Notices sur les objets envoyés à l'exposition des produits de l'industrie française; rédigées et imprimées par ordre de S.E.M. de Champagny, Ministre de l'Intérieur., Paris, *Imprimerie impériale, 1806, pp. 285 – 287 p.
- J.V. de Moléon et L.-S. Le Normand, Musée des produits de l'industrie française ou Description des expositions faites à Paris depuis leur origine jusqu'à celle de 1819 *inclusivement, 1820, tome, 125 p.
- Archives Nationales, M.C., et./X/891, probate inventoryof Basile Leroy, October 13, 1809
- Marriage certificate, (acte de mariage) Jean-Baptiste-Charles-François Oudin and Henriette-Louise-Marceline Mussard, January 19, 1811
- Almanach de la fabrique de Paris, J.-A. Azur, 1812
- Annuaire général du commerce, de l'industrie, et de la magistrature, Firmin Didot Frères, 1845, article "Horlogers"
- Exposition de 1819. Rapport du jury, Paris, Imprimerie royale, 1819
- Exposition Universelle de Londres 1862. Catalogue des objets principaux composant l'exposition de la Maison Oudin-Charpentier, horloger, 1862
- Exposition Universelle de Paris 1867, Maison Charles Oudin, Catalogue des principaux objets de l'exposition de Oudin-Charpentier, 1867
- Catalogue des objets principaux composant l'exposition de la maison Oudin-Charpentier horloger, London Universal Exhibition 1862, Section Française, Class 15 - N° 1590, 1862, 17 p.
- « VOX Spring 2007 », at data.antiquorum.com (consulté le 29 juin 2016)
- « VOX Summer 2007 », at data.antiquorum.com (consulté le 29 juin 2016)
- Catalogue des principaux objets de l'exposition Oudin-Charpentier, Horloger Particulier des leurs majestés l'Empereur et l'Impératrice, de N.S.P. le pape, de LL. MM. la Reine et le Roi d'Espagne et de LL. MM. les Rois d'Italie et de Grèce, Paris, 19 p., p. 15
- Exposition Universelle de Paris 1867, Catalogue des principaux objets de l'exposition de Oudin-Charpentier..., Paris, p. 9
- Notices sur les objets envoyés à l'exposition des produits de l'industrie française, Paris, l'Imprimerie Impériale, 1806 (read online)
- Exposition Universelle de Londres 1862, Catalogue des objets principaux de l'exposition de Oudin-Charpentier..., Paris, couverture
- Exposition Universelle de Paris 1867, Catalogue des principaux objets de l'exposition de Oudin-Charpentier..., Paris, 19 p., p. 19
- Exposition Universelle de Paris 1867, Catalogue des principaux objets de l'exposition de Oudin-Charpentier..., Paris, 19 p., p. 7
- Catalogue des objets principaux de l'exposition d'Oudin-Charpentier, Exposition Universelle de Londres, 1862, 1862, no. 13
- Exposition Universelle de Paris 1867, Catalogue des principaux objets de l'exposition de Oudin-Charpentier..., Paris, 19 p., p. 3
- Jean-Claude Sabrier, « Oudin, A Horological Dynasty Closely Linked to Breguet, Part I », Vox, The Antiquorum Magazine, Spring 2007, p. 118
- Jean-Claude Sabrier, « Oudin, A Horological Dynasty Closely Linked to Breguet, Part I », Vox, The Antiquorum Magazine, Spring 2007, p. 121
- (en) « Collection search », at metmuseum.org
- (en) « 6. Lady’s Watch and Pearled Chainc. 1810, French, maker Charles Oudin, Paris », at thebowesmuseum.org.uk
- (en) "Collection online", at britishmuseum.org
- "La mesure du temps au musée des arts et métiers", at arts-et-métiers.net
