= Rue de Valois =

Street in Paris, France

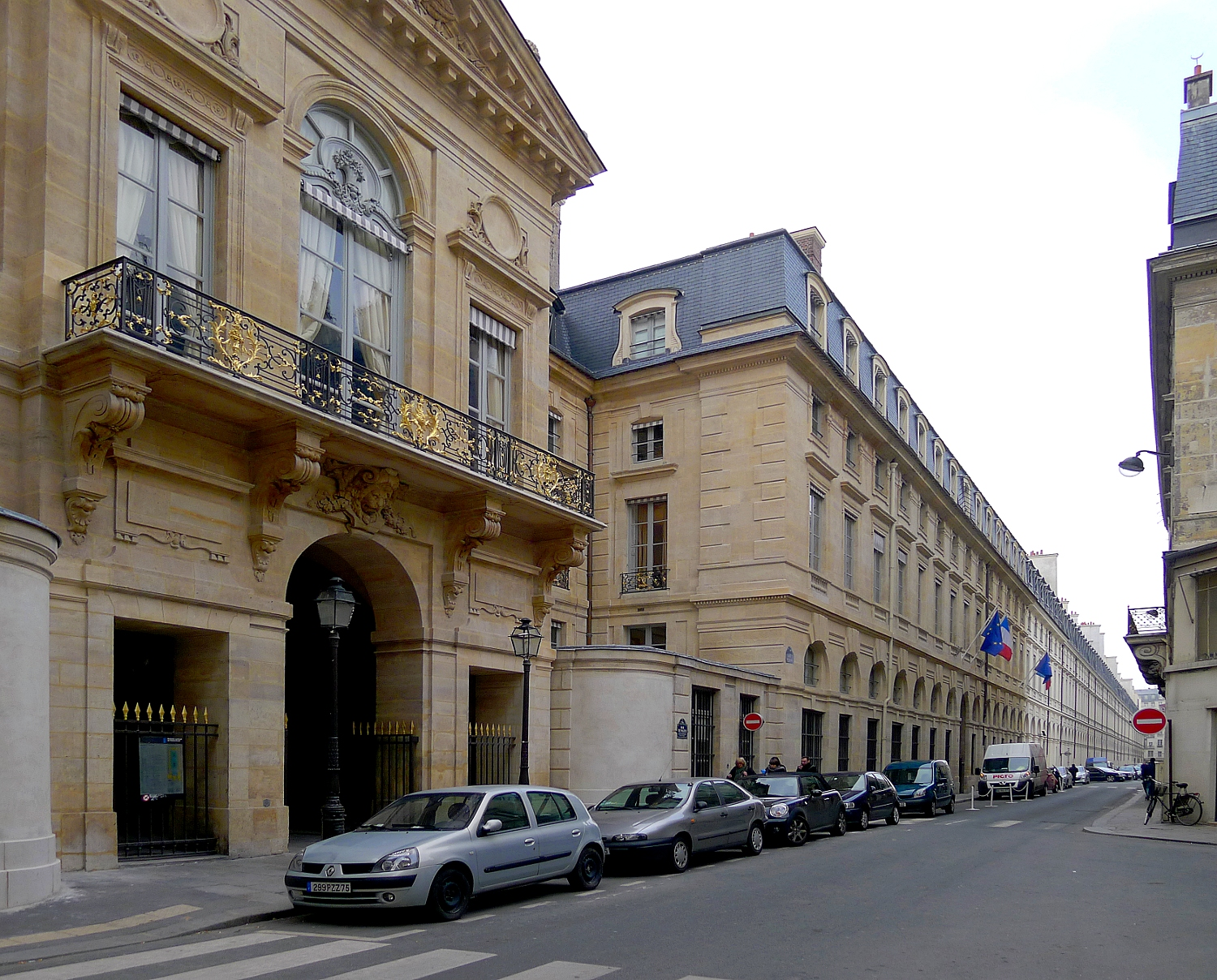
- No. 3, headquarters of the Ministry of Culture

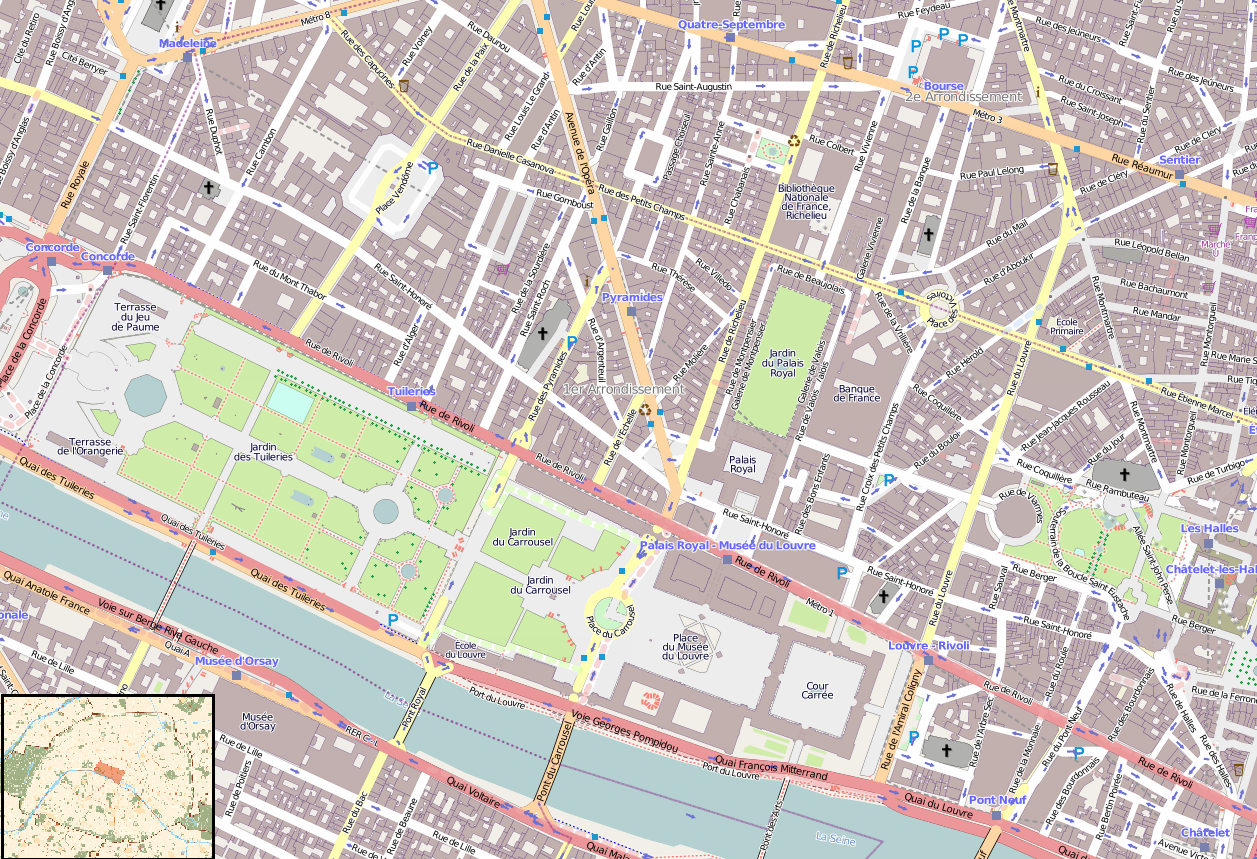
- Location within 1st arrondissement of Paris Location within Paris
- Former names: Rue du Lycée (1798–1814); Rue du Vingt-Quatre Février (1848–1852)
- Type: Street
- Length: 377 m (1,237 ft)
- Width: from 8.75 to 12 m
- Location: Paris, France
- Arrondissement: 1st arrondissement
- Quarter: Palais-Royal
- Coordinates: 48.86421°N 2.338323°E
- From: 202, rue Saint-Honoré
- To: 1, rue de Beaujolais

The Rue de Valois (French pronunciation: [ʁy d(ə) valwa]) is a street in the Palais-Royal quarter in the 1st arrondissement of Paris, France.

== Description ==
The 377-meter-long-street starts at 202, Rue Saint-Honoré and ends at 1, Rue de Beaujolais. It has a north-south orientation and is a one-way street.

== Name ==
The street was named after Louis Philippe I, Duke of Valois, the son of Louis Philippe II, Duke of Orléans.

== History ==
To pay debts, Louis Philippe II, Duke of Orléans, the owner of the Palais-Royal, decided to divide the lands around the Palais' garden into plots. The street was opened in 1784 under the name Passage de Valois. It was named the Rue du Lycée from Thermidor 2, Year VI (July 20, 1798) to April 27, 1814; then it was called the Rue de Valois-Palais-Royal to distinguish it from the Rue de Valois-Saint-Honoré (disestablished in the 1850s) and the Rue de Valois-du-Roule (merged into the Rue de Monceau in 1868).

During the July Revolution, clashes between insurgents and troops took place in the street.

Under the Second Republic, the street was renamed the Rue du Vingt-Quatre-Février ("February 24 Street") to commemorate the date of Louis Philippe I's abdication and of the provisional proclamation of the Republic.

== Notable buildings ==
- No. 3: headquarters of the Ministry of Culture. The media often use the term Rue de Valois as a metonymy to refer to the Ministry of Culture.
- No. 4: the Grand Hôtel of the Palais-Royal. It became a five-star hotel in July 2013. It had famous guests like Jean Anthelme Brillat-Savarin and composer Jean-Baptiste Lully. Since July 8, 2013, the hotel's Lulli restaurant has paid tribute to the composer.
- No. 8: Le Bœuf à la mode, a restaurant established on the former site of the restaurant Mérot created in 1796. The name bœuf à la mode was inspired by the restaurant's sign and the statuette located inside, whose clothes changed according to the fashion of the time. The restaurant was owned by Tissot during the Directory, then by Prosper Montagné. It closed in 1936. The restaurant's premises and the clothed statuette still exist.
- No. 9: former headquarters of the Radical Party until 1933.
- No. 48: building built by François Guiraud de Talairac in 1781. At this time, it was the tallest building in Paris, with eight floors and an attic. The passageway that crosses the building became a private property. It was connected to the Rue Radziwill, which was called the Rue Neuve-des-Bons-Enfants at this time.
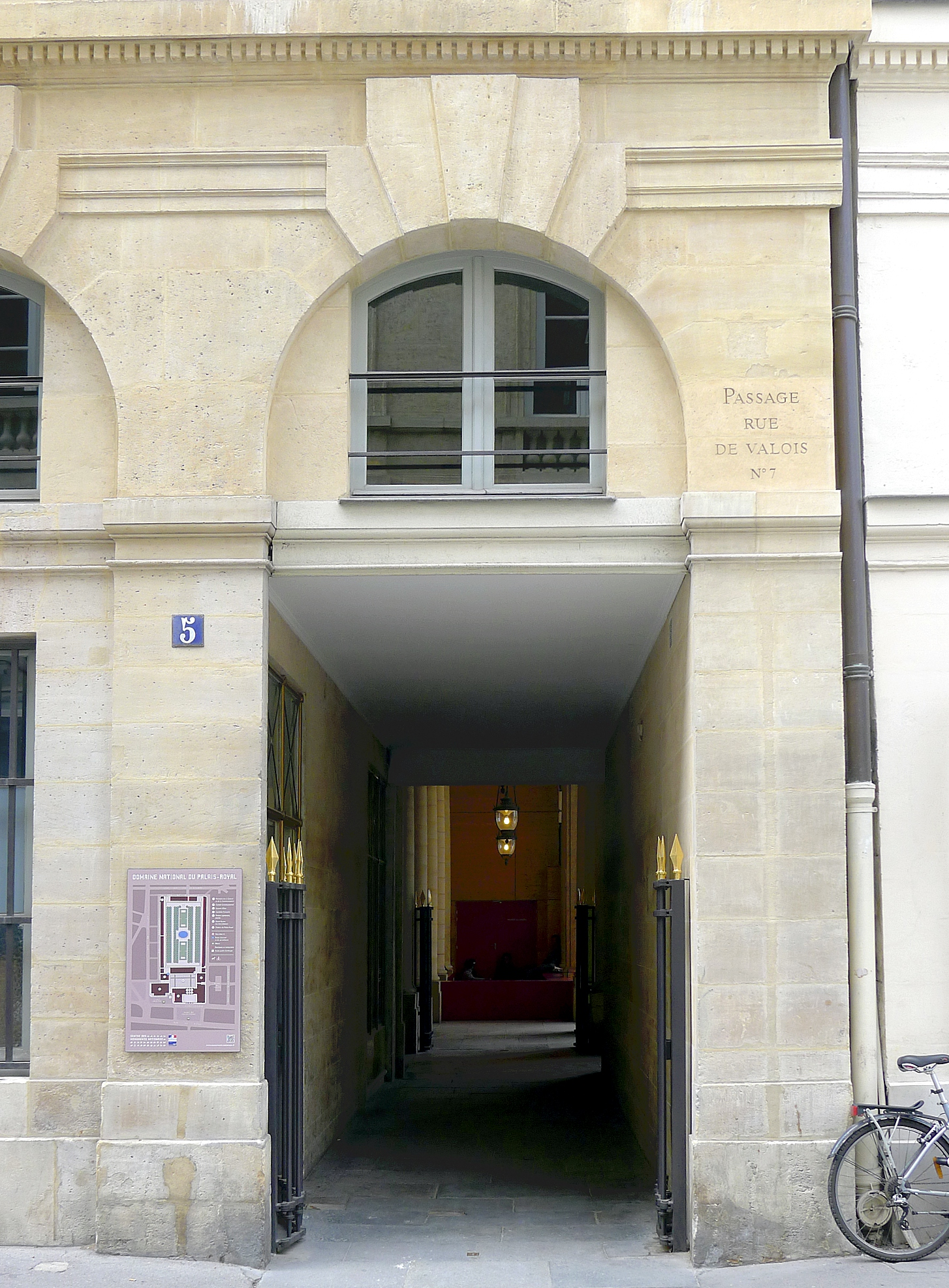
Nos. 5–7: Passage de Valois

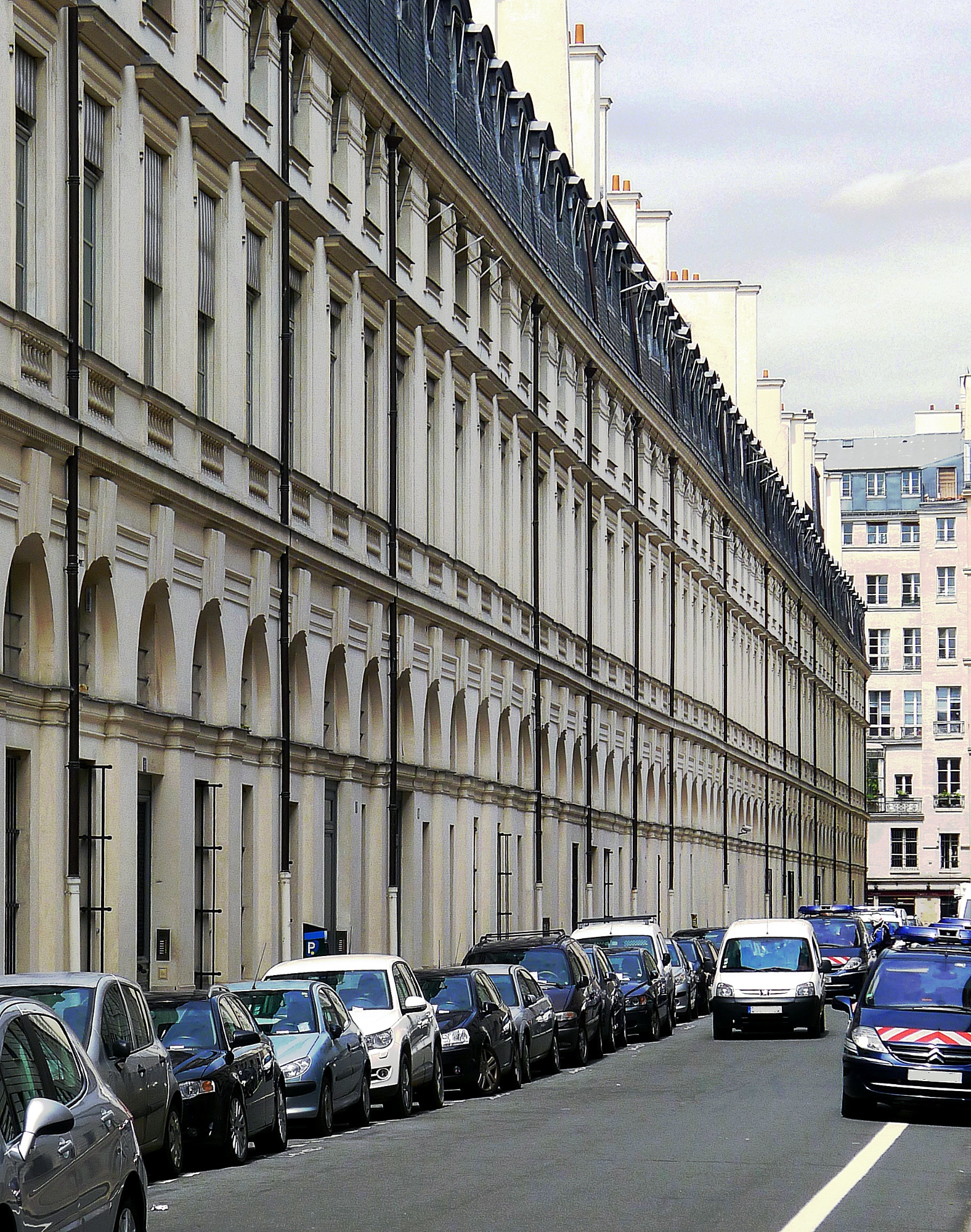
Rue de Valois

== See also ==
- List of streets in the 1st arrondissement of Paris
