= Jacques Boyceau =

French garden designer

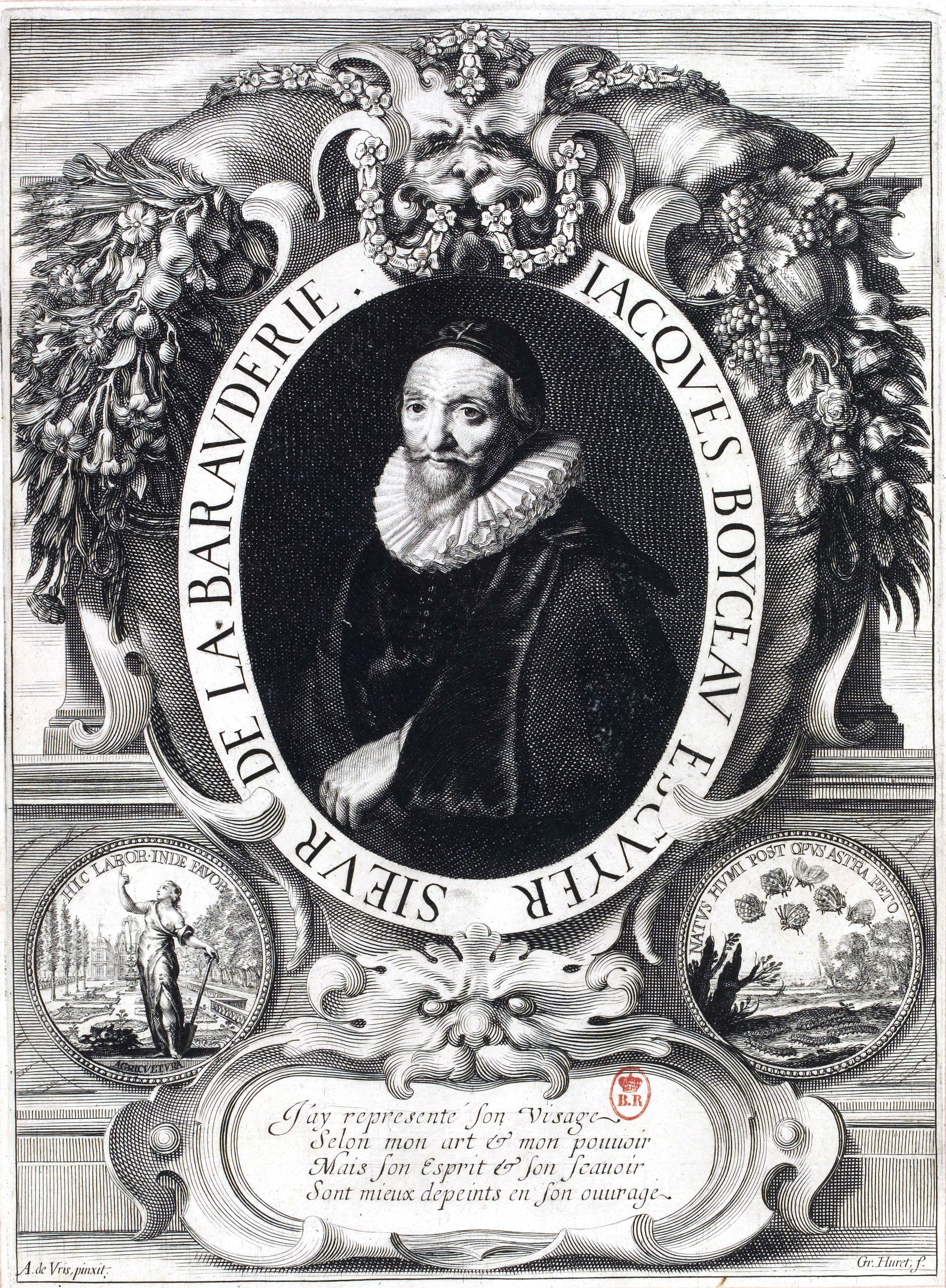
Jacques Boyceau

Jacques Boyceau, sieur de la Barauderie (ca. 1560 – 1633) was a French garden designer, the superintendent of royal gardens under Louis XIII, whose posthumously produced Traité du iardinage selon les raisons de la nature et de l'art. Ensemble divers desseins de parterres, pelouzes, bosquets et autres ornements was published in 1638. Its sixty engravings after Boyceau's designs make it one of the milestones in tracing the history of the Garden à la française (French formal garden). His nephew Jacques de Menours, who produced the volume, included an engraved frontispiece with the portrait of Boyceau.

A few of the plates show formally planted bosquets, but the majority are of designs for parterres. The accompanying text asserts that some of these designs have been used at royal residences: the Palais du Luxembourg, where the two axes at right angles survive from Boyceau's original plan, the Jardin des Tuileries, the newly built château of Saint Germain-en-Laye, even at the simple château at Versailles.

Boyceau was made a gentilhomme ordinaire de la chambre du roi and ennobled for his efforts, as the sieur de la Barauderie.

Boyceau's book is the first French work to treat the esthetic of gardening, not simply its practice. It was designed for the patron rather than for the gardener, but it had an influence on the designs of André Le Nôtre, who transformed the manner of Boyceau and of the Mollet dynasty of royal gardeners—Claude Mollet and André Mollet—to create the culminating French Baroque gardens, exemplified at Vaux-le-Vicomte and Versailles.

An engraving reproduced in Boyceau's Traité du jardinage depicts his parterre design centered on the garden front of the Luxembourg Palace. Basically a square within a square, it was crowned at the far end by a half circle the width of the inner square. The great square was centered on a pool of water with a single jet in a sunken plat surrounded by four sloped spandrel compartments, each incorporating an inward-facing monogram of Marie de' Medici (the letter "M" surmounted by the royal crown), and outside this, four framing trapezoids interrupted at their centers by circular motifs bearing outward-facing, smaller versions of the monogram. The compartments, all filled with fine rinceaux executed in clipped boxwood and colored gravels, were set in wide gravel walks. The design, likely executed sometime between 1615 and 1629, expressed variety within a unified ensemble and was best appreciated from the windows of the piano nobile, as shown in the engraving by Zeillerus. The parterre was much modified by 1652 as evidenced by the map of Gomboust, and even further after 1693 in favour of the broader, simpler parterre of Claude Desgotz.

Parterre of the Luxembourg Garden c. 1615–1629

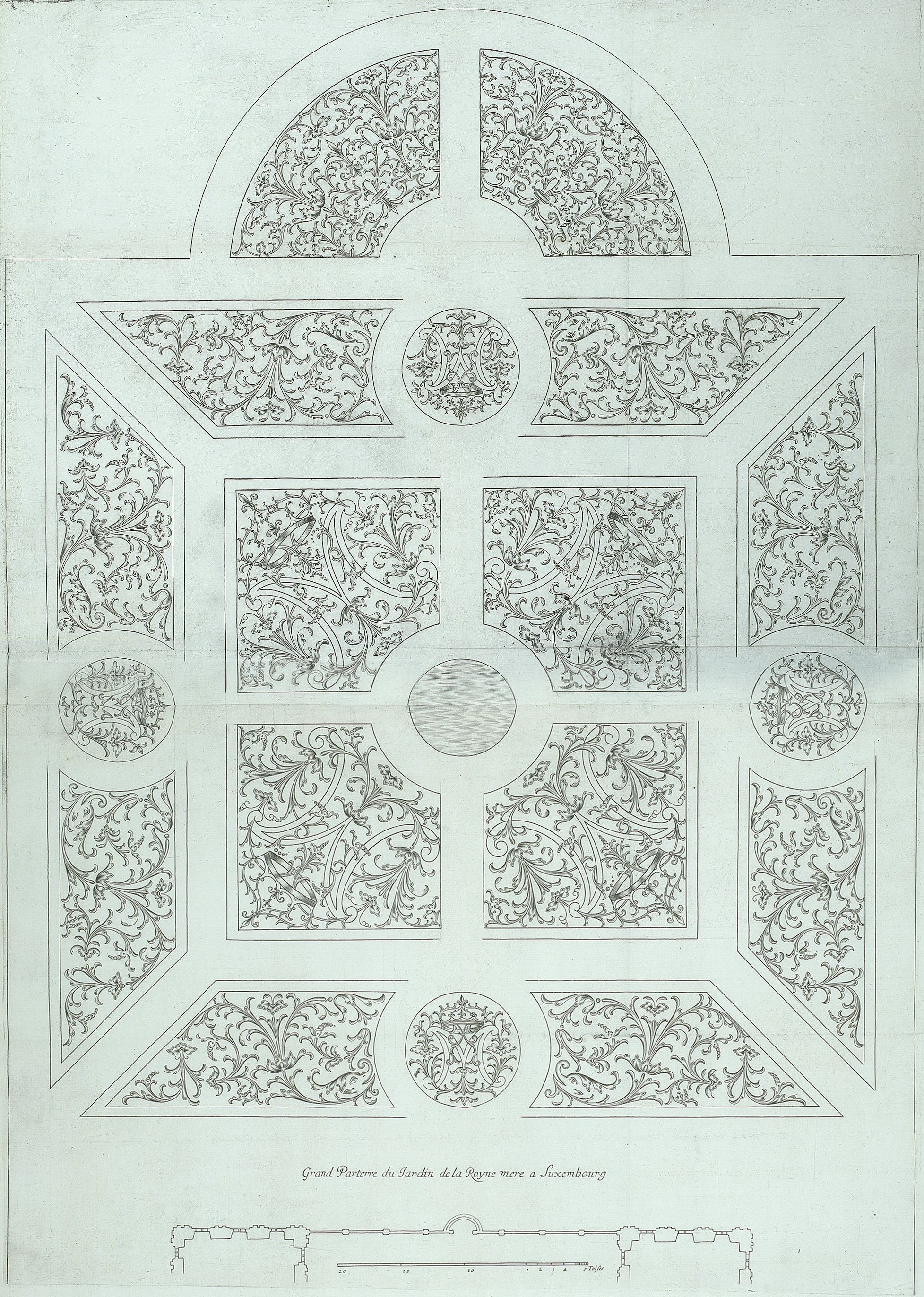
Boyceau's design

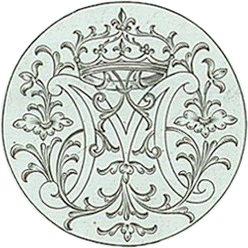
Detail with monogram

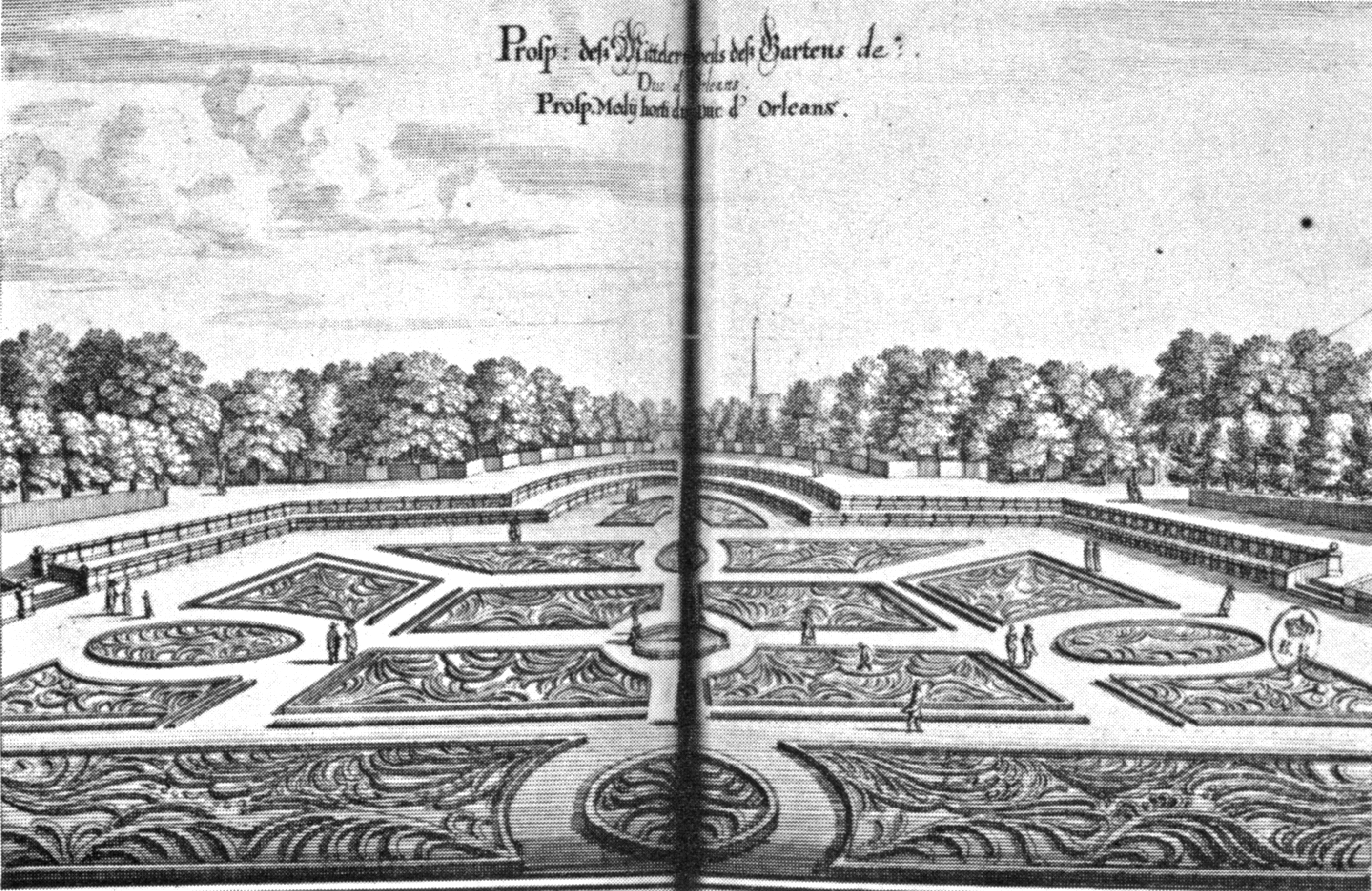
View from the palace, engraved by Zeillerus
