= Sundial cannon =

Sundial equipped with a cannon which fires at noon

A small brass cannon mounted on a marble sundial base, manufactured by Rousseau of Paris

A sundial cannon, sundial gun, noon cannon or meridian cannon, also noonday gun is a device consisting of a sundial incorporating a cannon with a fuse that is lit by an overhanging lens, concentrating the rays of the sun, and causing the cannon to fire at noon, when properly oriented along a north–south axis. The cannon sizes ranged from large to small depending on the location of their use. The household variety was used in estates to signal the time for the midday meal. Larger sizes were used in European parks to signal noon.

The cannons were used by European royalty in the 18th century. Cannons of this type are exhibited at the National Maritime Museum in Greenwich. The Hamilton Watch Company has a sundial cannon manufactured by Rousseau of Paris ca. 1650. The Rousseau cannon is mounted on a marble sundial and is made of brass. The Sultan of Morocco also owns one that was manufactured by Baker & Sons of London.

Currently the only sun cannon in regular operation was installed in 1853 in a tower in the park of Adelsnäs Manor in Åtvidaberg, Sweden. Its 6-pounder gun fires daily from May through August (manually lit on cloudy days).

== History ==
The earliest sundial cannons were used in Europe in the 1600s. They were also used in European parks during the 18th and early 19th centuries. The cannon-lens combination was mounted on a sundial. Sundial guns were also used to mark noon. Miniaturized toy versions of the guns were sold in 1979 as unassembled kits by Dixie Gun Works.

== Operation ==
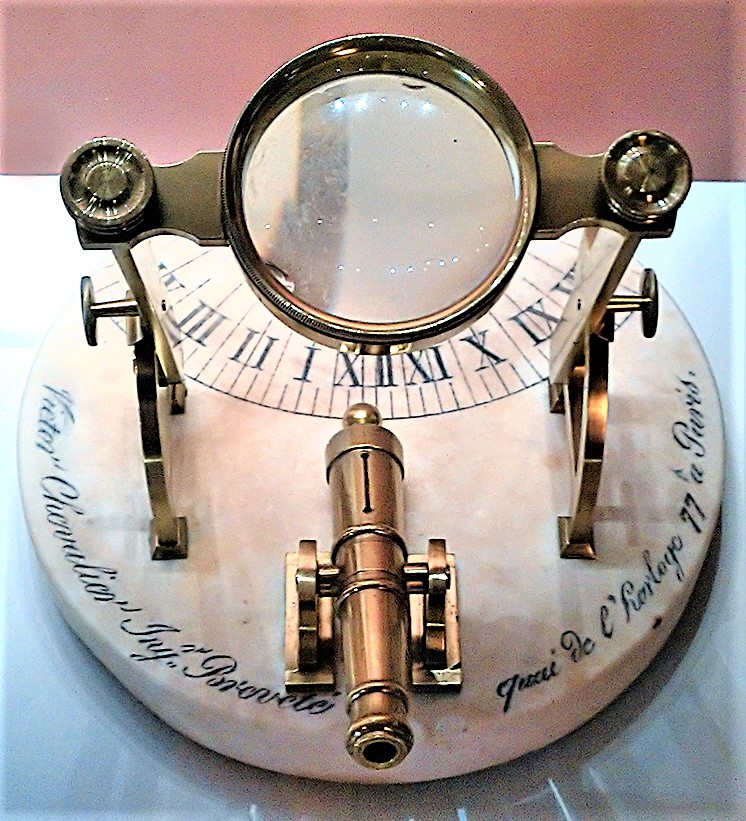
A sundial cannon manufactured by Victor Chevalier of Paris ca. 1800. The linear ignition groove is in the same direction as the north–south axis of the sundial

The gun and the linear ignition groove of the fuse were aligned on a north–south axis, parallel to that of the sundial, while the lens concentrated the sun rays on the fuse when the sun was directly above. Subsequently, the burning fuse ignited the powder placed in the barrel of the cannon. The lens was mounted on an adjustable frame, which enabled its position to be changed depending on the season. During winter, in December for example, for the small brass cannon manufactured by Rousseau of Paris, the lens had to be lowered by four inches, compared to its position in June as the position of the sun in the sky is lower in winter than during the summer.

In naval operations, the gun had to be mounted on a rotating base because its orientation had to be in the north–south direction. The directional axis of the gun was determined using the ship's compass. In such operation, the gun was frequently referred to as the "noonday gun" because it fired at noon. This practice became obsolete when the ship chronometer was invented. The use of the sundial cannon was subsequently confined to substandard ships.

== Benjamin Franklin ==
Benjamin Franklin wrote the following review about the cannons in Poor Richard's Almanack:

How to make a STRIKING SUNDIAL, by which not only a Man's own Family, but all his Neighbours for ten Miles round, may know what o'Clock it is, when the Sun shines, without seeing the dial. [...] Note also, That the chief Expence will be the Powder, for the Cannon once bought, will, with Care, last 100 Years. Note moreover, That there will be a great Saving of Powder in cloudy Days. Kind Reader, Methinks I hear thee say, That is indeed a good Thing to know how the Time passes.

== Popular Mechanics ==
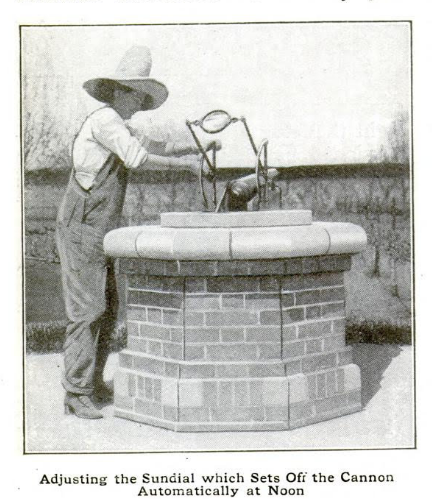
A farmer shown adjusting the lens position for a sundial cannon. From an article titled "Women 'Insurgents' in the Farming Business" in the July 1911 issue of Popular Mechanics. The original caption is: "Adjusting the Sundial which Sets Off the Cannon Automatically at Noon"

In a section of the July 1911 issue of Popular Mechanics titled "Women 'Insurgents' in the Farming Business" the writer comments regarding the picture to the right:

Whatever may be surmised at first glance, the lady of the exaggerated jupe-culotte is not a member of the Mexican insurrectionist artillery preparing to defend her pretty little private fort against the forces of the tyrant Diaz. The insurrection, however, is all there and all directed against the tyrant Man. In fine, she of the honest workingman's jeans is one of the suffragette farmerettes now being turned out by Mrs Belmont's Long Island colony—to the general end that they may run the earth in absolute independence of the legitimate occupants of similar jeans. The cannon is a sort of emancipated dinnerbell, and the thing that looks like one end of a stereoscope is a lens rigged to the sundial which forms the cannon's bed. As the sun works around to noon, the solar rays are focused on the fuse, and with the blast, liberated woman knows that dinner is served. And, if one pause to wonder, this is a refined and soothing way to fire a cannon. Having set the mechanism, even an average walker can put ten miles of quiet open country between herself and the chance of shattered eardrums and lacerated nerves.

== In literature ==
A sundial gun is mentioned in Ellery Queen's Mystery Magazine.

== See also ==
- Noon Gun
- Noonday Gun
