= Galeries de bois =

Shopping galleries at the Palais-Royal, Paris

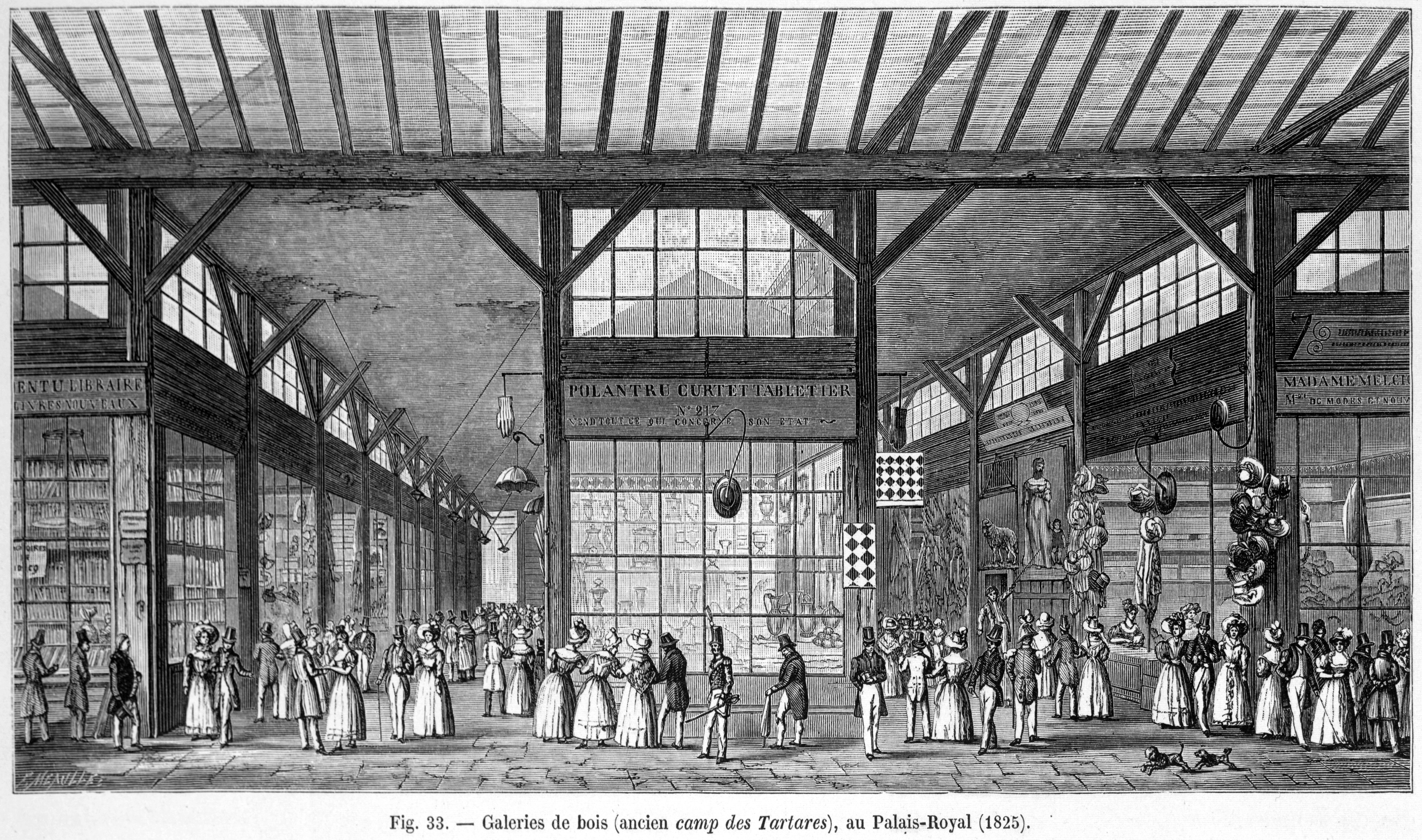
- Interior of the wooden galleries in 1825, in a later illustration by Theodor Josef Hubert Hoffbauer
- Alternative names: Galerie de bois; Camp des Tartares

General information
- Status: Demolished
- Type: Shopping galleries
- Location: Palais-Royal, 1st arrondissement of Paris, Paris, France
- Coordinates: 48.8637°N 2.3374°E
- Year built: 1780s (Note: The construction date differs between sources. Sandoz gives late 1784. The Centre des monuments nationaux gives 1786. Peter Coleman gives 1788. Geist dates the galleries to 1786–1788.)
- Demolished: 1828 (begun)

Technical details
- Material: Wood

The Galeries de bois ("Wooden Galleries"), also called the Galerie de bois or the Camp des Tartares ("Tartar Camp"), were wooden shopping galleries at the Palais-Royal in Paris. Built as temporary premises in the 1780s, they stood between the palace courtyard and garden. Three rows of shops formed two covered passages. Booksellers, milliners and other traders occupied the shops. Crowds gathered to stroll in the galleries in the evening.

Johann Friedrich Geist regarded them as the first shopping arcade. Their demolition began in 1828 to make way for the Galerie d'Orléans. Honoré de Balzac described them at length in Illusions perdues, in the part translated into English as A Distinguished Provincial at Paris.

== History ==
In 1781, Victor Louis proposed enclosing the Palais-Royal garden with buildings containing shops and apartments. The Duke of Chartres intended to raise money by letting them. The plan included a wing separating the garden from the palace courtyards.

The wooden galleries occupied the site of a terrace that had separated the garden from the main courtyard and joined the two wings of the palace. Victor Louis had planned a building and dome there, but its foundations had risen barely a metre above the ground. The duke, who was heavily in debt, had a large temporary wooden building erected on them. G.-Roger Sandoz dated its construction to the end of 1784.

The first tenant was Romain, who transferred the lease to Lavoyepierre in 1789. A new twelve-year lease in 1792 required Lavoyepierre to build the adjoining Galerie vitrée ("Glass Gallery"), between the theatre, the Rue de Montpensier and the Galerie de Montpensier. The wooden shops were sublet to booksellers, milliners and linen sellers. Luxury trades and leading booksellers were drawn to the galleries as their popularity grew.

== Layout ==
Interior plan of the Galerie de bois

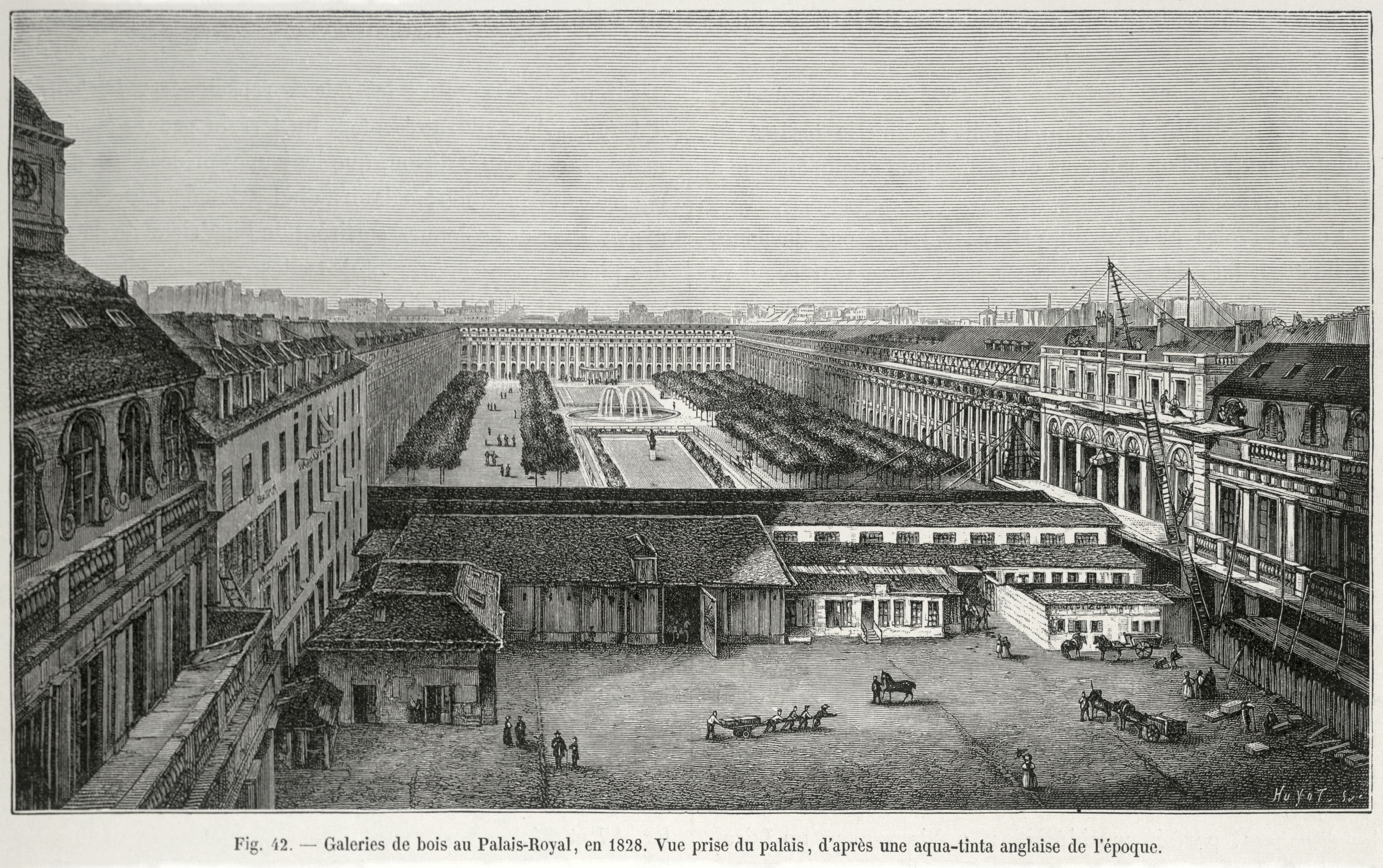
The galleries and garden in 1828, viewed from the palace, in a later illustration by Hoffbauer

Roof plan and section of the Galerie de bois

Three rows of shops were separated lengthwise by two covered walks. Each walk had a lead-covered roof higher than the roofs of the shops, with a line of windows above the shops on either side. Forty lamps, suspended on pulleys, lit the galleries at night. Signs and inscriptions hung from the crossbeams.

Geist gives the passages' height as 4–5 m (13–16 ft). The roof was supported by six rows of wooden posts, strengthened by struts (braces). Boards and plaster covered the underside of the roof. Shops in the middle row opened onto both passages, while those at the ends had windows on three sides. In Geist's reading of the illustrations, some shops had open fronts that were closed with boards at night.

On the garden side, a long plastered wall had small barred windows, wider than they were high. A trellis and climbing plants covered part of the wall. The floor of the galleries was beaten earth, to which passing shoes and boots continually added mud. A passage crossed the galleries at the centre. Entrances at either end led through peristyles, columned porches begun before the French Revolution and left unfinished.

The adjoining Glass Gallery was a narrow, high passage leading towards the Théâtre-Français. Its roof was glazed throughout. Part had a lean-to roof, with a single slope. The rest had a saddle roof, with two slopes meeting at a ridge.

== Shops and visitors ==
The shops sold books, prints and newspapers, clothing, gloves and perfumes, as well as food and household goods. According to Sandoz, shops of only five or six square metres could command rents of a thousand écus (crowns). Félix and Louis Lazare described the galleries, lined with milliners' shops, as a favourite haunt of evening strollers, who crowded into the narrow space. They quoted Louis-Sébastien Mercier's account of the Palais-Royal's traders, speculators and prostitutes. Mercier called the two wooden galleries the Camp des Tartares and hoped that a new gallery would replace them.

F. M. Marchant's 1815 guidebook, quoted by Geist, warned visitors to watch their pockets in the crowded passages. Marchant complained that most traders overcharged, while booksellers sold at the same prices as elsewhere in Paris.

== Balzac's account ==
Balzac opened Part II of A Distinguished Provincial at Paris with a description of the galleries, before continuing the story of Lucien de Rubempré's visit to the publisher Dauriat. In Ellen Marriage's translation, they "used to be one of the most famous sights of Paris". The centre row of shops was open back and front like booths in a country fair, so that customers could look through from one passage to the other. Some shops facing the court or garden had proper fronts and handsome windows.

In this account, booksellers and milliners occupied the galleries by day. Of a morning the galleries were empty, dark, and deserted; the shopkeepers chatted among themselves. Towards two o'clock in the afternoon the Palais began to fill; at three, men came in from the Bourse. Young people who could not afford books read them at the booksellers' stalls, sometimes finishing a volume in a couple of afternoons. The Glass Gallery housed showmen, ventriloquists, marionettes and other attractions.

Towards nightfall, prostitutes came to promenade in the Wooden Galleries. Balzac distinguished them from the women associated with particular houses in the palace's stone galleries. So great was the crowd at night that it was impossible to move except at a slow pace, as in a procession or at a masked ball. The murmur of voices and laughter could be heard from the middle of the garden.

Geist treated Balzac's description as a record of the galleries' social life and reproduced it at length.

== Demolition ==
In 1828, Pierre-François-Léonard Fontaine began removing the wooden galleries as part of Louis Philippe, Duke of Orléans's restoration of the palace. The Lazares recorded that they had been replaced by the Galerie d'Orléans in 1829. Balzac described visitors continuing to walk on planks laid over the cellars of the new buildings, and wrote that the disappearance of the wooden galleries was regretted.

== Influence ==
Geist argued that the galleries' commercial success encouraged the construction of other arcades nearby. He identified shops on both sides of a passage and a separate source of daylight for the passage as the features that made the temporary building an arcade.

He related their success to the public life of the wider Palais-Royal. Its reading rooms and bookshops, places of entertainment and other businesses brought together patrons from diverse social backgrounds.

== See also ==
- Covered passages of Paris
