= Charles Percier =

French architect (1764–1838)

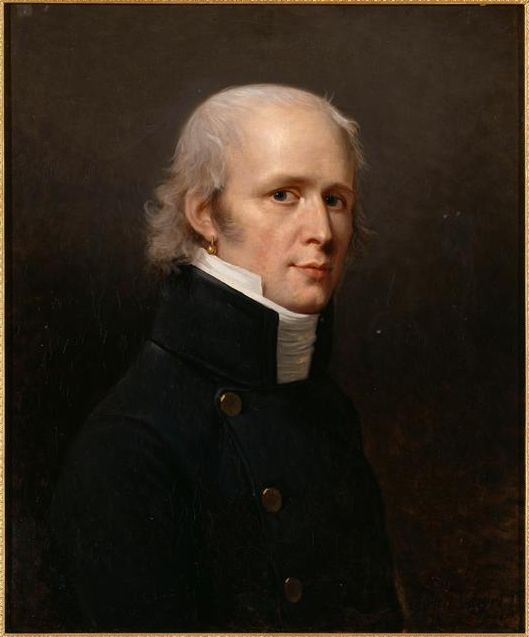
Charles Percier. Portrait by Robert Lefèvre (1807)

Charles Percier ([ʃaʁl pɛʁsje]; 22 August 1764 – 5 September 1838) was a neoclassical French architect, interior decorator and designer, who worked in a close partnership with Pierre François Léonard Fontaine, originally his friend from student days. For work undertaken from 1794 onward, trying to ascribe conceptions or details to one or other of them is fruitless; it is impossible to disentangle their cooperative efforts in this fashion. Together, Percier and Fontaine were inventors and major proponents of the rich, grand, consciously-archaeological versions of neoclassicism we recognise as Directoire style and Empire style.

== Biography ==
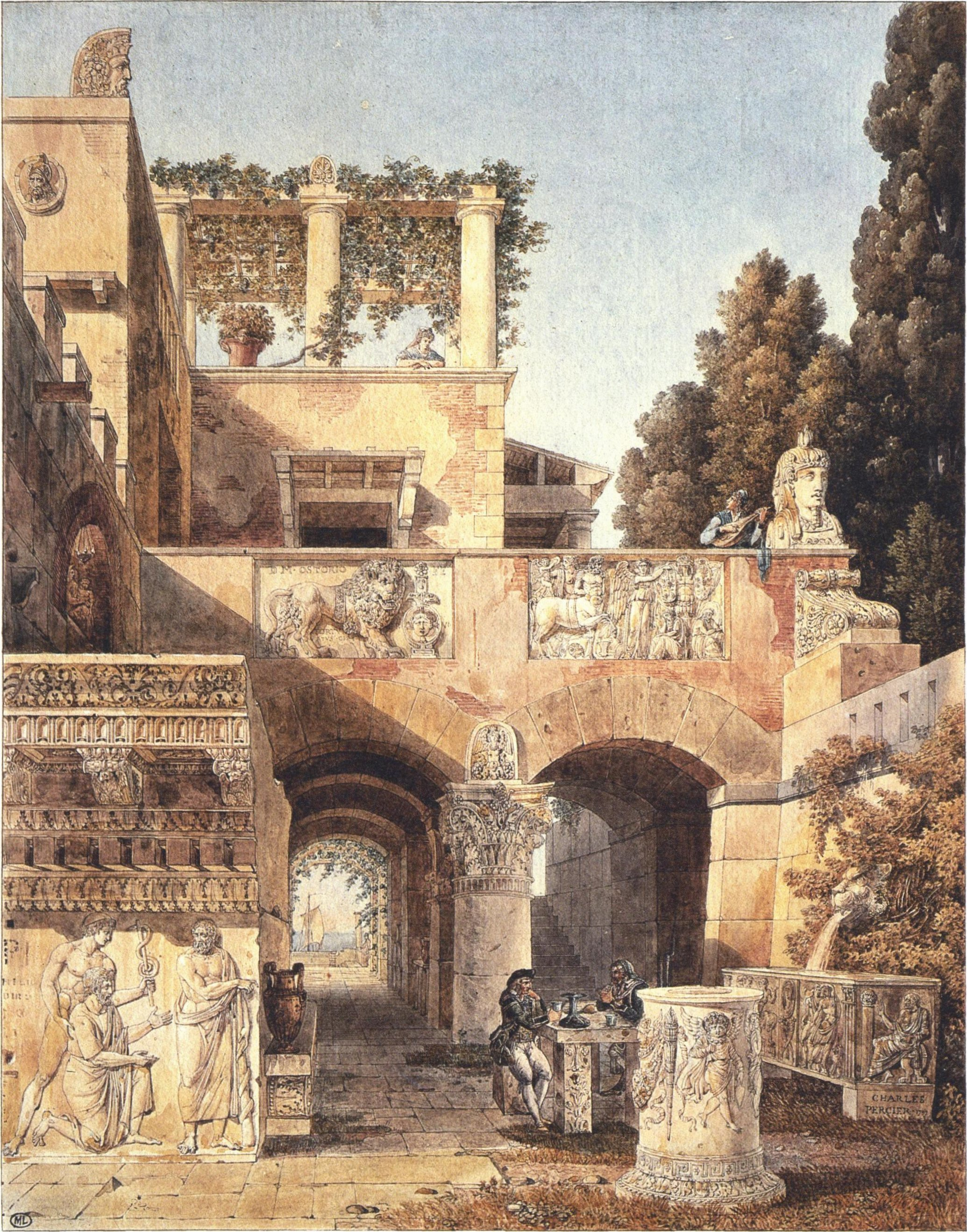
View of a Roman House (watercolor)

Percier was born into a poor Parisian family in 1764. His mother was a laundry woman for Marie-Antoinette and his father was a porter at one of the gates of the Tuileries Palace, who was later promoted into a post in the interior of the palace. This afforded the young Charles Portier an opportunity to observe first hand the lifestyles of the wealthy nobility in a palace that he would, years later, play a major role in rejuvenating.

=== Schooling and early career ===
From the age of 12 onward, Percier attended a free school for teaching drawing, an establishment whose mission was to provide access into the art world for poor students. Percier's talent was quickly recognised. After passing a short time in the studio of a painter named Lagrenée, a place was found for him in the highly respected studio of the renowned architect, Antoine-François Peyre. It was there that he met Pierre Fontaine, with whom he would form a life-long and very successful partnership. Starting in 1794, Fontaine and Percier worked so closely together that it is often difficult to separate their contributions. A 19th century observer noted the following about their intertwined careers: "It is surprising what a complete mastery these young men in a few years contrived to exercise over the tastes of their day."

Percier won the second prix de Rome in 1783, and, in 1784, at the age of twenty years, he won the grand prix de Rome (with a pension). This paid for his stay in Rome. Fontaine had won the second prix de Rome a year earlier and was already in Rome. Percier returned to Paris from Rome in 1791.

One early product of their collaboration was Palais, maisons et autres édifices modernes dessinés à Rome ("A palace, houses and other modern buildings designed in Rome"), which attracted the attention of prospective clients when they returned to Paris. At the end of 1792, near the end of the first phase of the French Revolution, Percier was appointed to supervise the scenery at the Paris Opera, a post at the center of innovative design. Fontaine returned from the security of London and they continued at the Opéra together until 1796. Charles-Louis Bernier was a third member of their team.

=== Architect, designer and artist ===
Their initial successes in interior decoration came while serving wealthy, private clients: "The first clients of Percier and Fontaine were the financiers Ouvrard, Chauvelin and Gaudin, who had their recently acquired hotels in the Chaussée d'Antin district fitted out and decorated." It was through these private projects, which impressed the influential artist, David, that they first came to the attention of Joséphine de Beauharnais and Napoleon Bonaparte.

Bonaparte thought highly of their work and gave them responsibility for some of the most prestigious projects of the Consulate and the Empire periods, including the creation of the Rue de Rivoli and the development of the Louvre Palace. He appointed them as his personal architects and never wavered in his decision; they worked on imperial projects throughout Napoleon's time in power. The relationship only dissolved when Napoleon abdicated and was exiled to Elba in 1814. From that time forward, Percier conducted a student atelier, a teaching studio or workshop, and Fontaine became the more public face of the partnership.

They worked for ten years (1802–1812) on the Louvre. The old Louvre Palace had not been a royal residence for generations, so it was free of any taint associated with the detested Bourbons. It stood in the heart of Paris, so that the Emperor could be seen coming and going, unlike Versailles, which had been rendered uninhabitable through destruction and looting. They also pierced the first, western part of the rue de Rivoli, and built its distinctive arcades, and, in the process, built the northern, 'Rivoli' wing of the Louvre, thereby competing the Cour Carrée.^{:199}

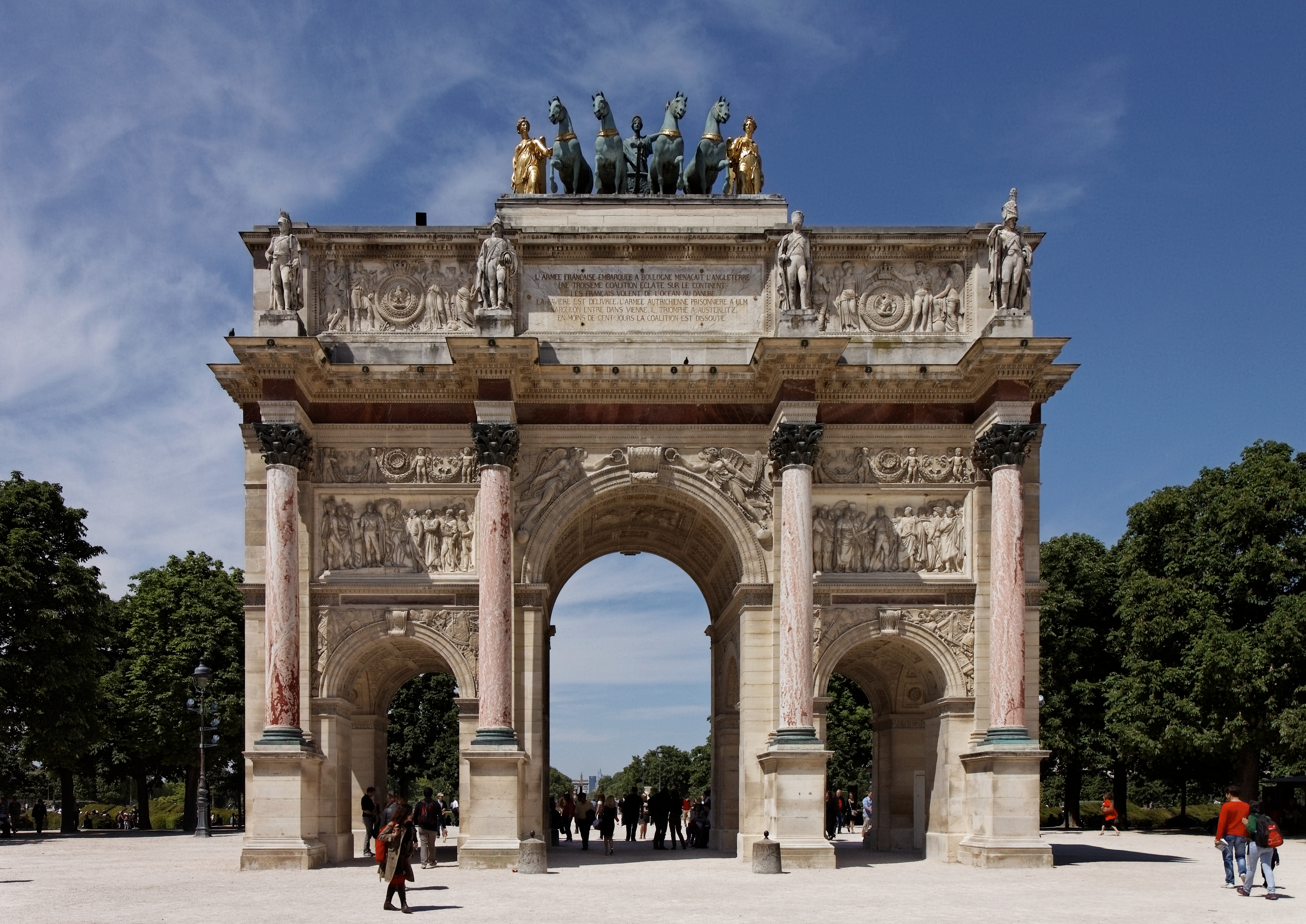
The eastern façade of the Arc de Triomphe du Carrousel

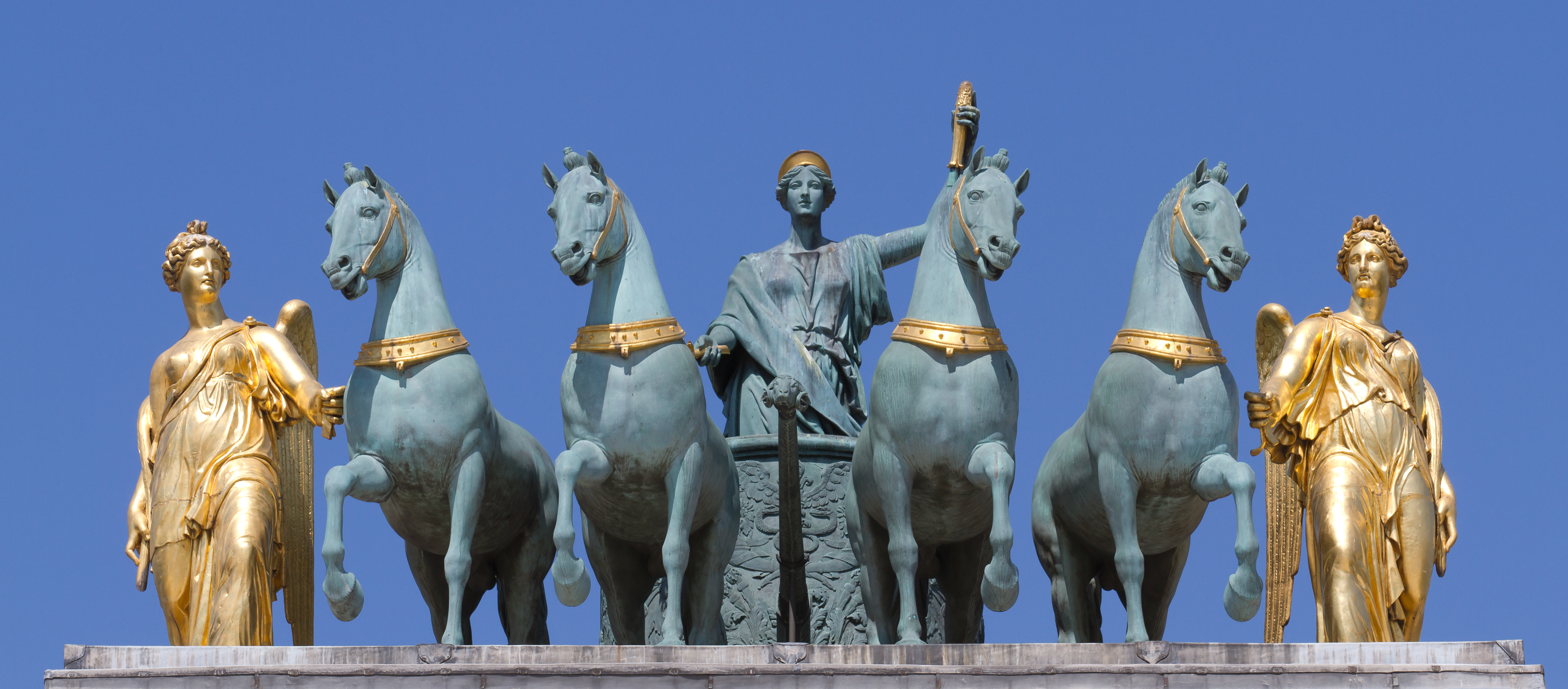
Detail of Peace riding in a triumphal chariot from the Arc de Triomphe du Carrousel

They refurbished and restructured the Tuileries Palace that, prior to being burnt down during the Paris Commune, faced the Louvre across the Place du Carrousel and the parterres. In that prominent square, Percier and Fontaine designed the Arc de Triomphe du Carrousel (1807–1808), commemorating the Napoleonic victories of the Third and Fourth Coalitions. Far from adhering to the classical model of nude statues, the designers of the Arc innovated by positioning, at the top of each of the Arc's eight marble columns, statues representing the eight corps of the Napoleonic army. Their uniforms are faithfully depicted in detail in these statues.^{:115}

Percier and Fontaine also refurbished Josephine's Château de Malmaison, as well as the Château de Montgobert for Pauline Bonaparte, and made alterations and decorations for former Bourbon palaces or castles at Compiègne, Saint-Cloud, and Fontainebleau. In working on these projects, they designed every detail of the interior decors: state beds, sculptural side tables, and other furniture, wall lights and candlesticks, chandeliers, door hardware, textiles, and wallpaper.

On special occasions, Percier was called upon to design for the Sèvres porcelain manufactory: in 1814 Percier's published designs were adapted by Alexandre Brogniart, director of Sèvres, a grand classicising vase 137 cm tall, that came to be known as the "Londonderry Vase" when Louis XVIII gave it to Lord Castlereagh just before the Congress of Vienna. Percier also designed the religious objects used in the baptism of Napoleon’s son.^{:220}

In 1812, Percier and Fontaine published the Recueil de décoration intérieure concernant tout ce qui rapporte à l'ameublement ("Collection of interior designs: Everything that relates to furniture") with its engravings in a spare outline technique. These engravings spread their style beyond the Empire, helping to put a French stamp on the English Regency style and influencing the Dutch-British connoisseur-designer, Thomas Hope. Indeed, their Empire style proved to be influential throughout Europe.

=== The partnership with Fontaine ===
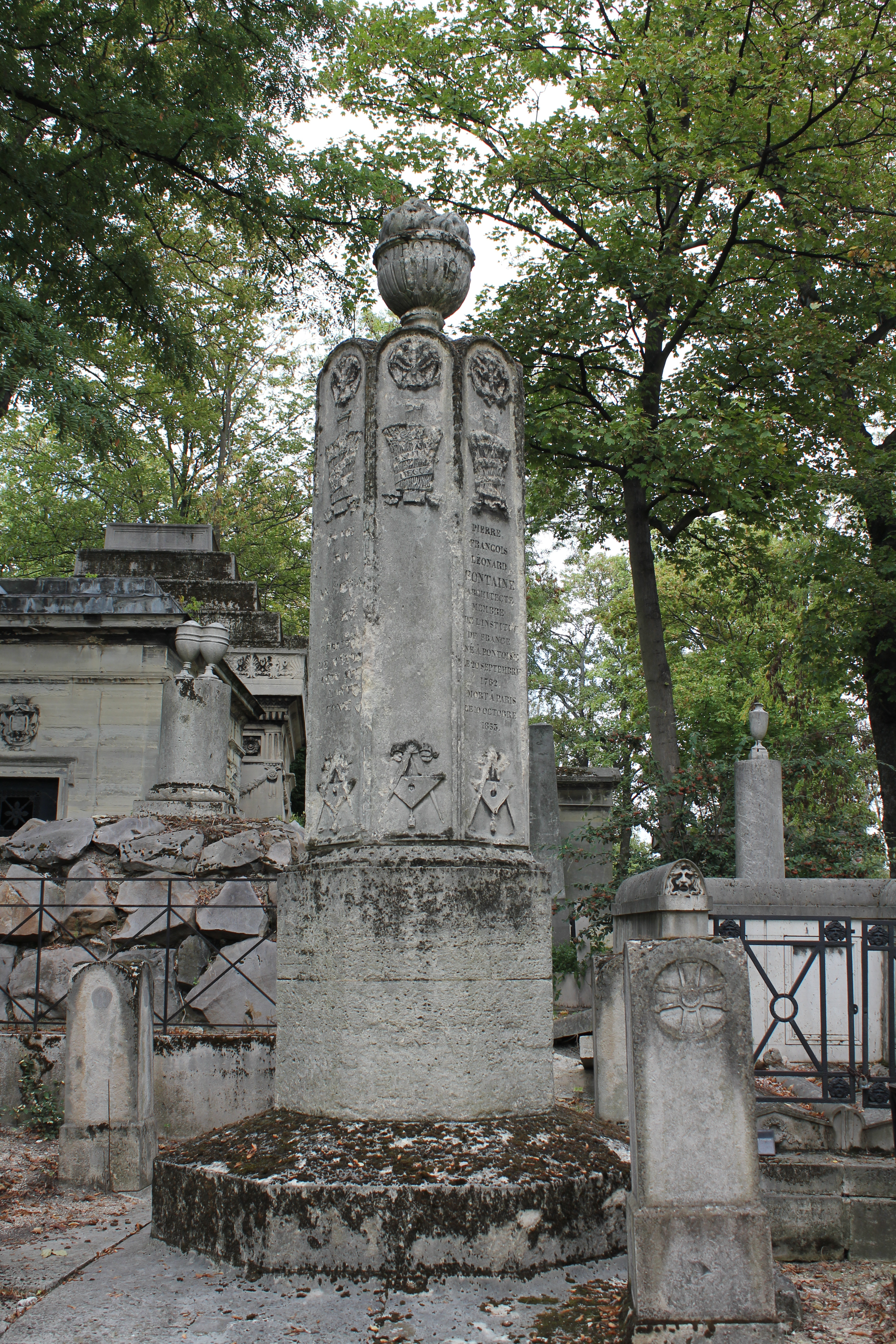
Tomb of Pierre Fontaine and Charles Percier in the Père Lachaise Cemetery in Paris (28th division, 12th line, R, 31)

Percier and Fontaine lived together for years as well as being colleagues and partners. Their different personalities and interests meant that they played different roles within the partnership. Fontaine assumed the public role and was the active manager of their projects and relations with clients, while Percier led a more reclusive existence in his apartments in the Louvre, while still participating conceptually in their joint projects and teaching at Beaux Arts.^{:33} Unlike Pierre Fontaine, whose diary relates his career path from the Consulate until the end of the July Monarchy, Percier did not leave memoirs, but, instead, he bequeathed his collections of drawings to the Institut de France.

=== Death ===
Percier died on 5 September 1838. Fontaine designed a tomb for him in their characteristic style in the Pere Lachaise Cemetery. Fontaine died much later on 10 October 1853. His body was interred in the tomb he designed for Percier, in accordance with his wishes.

== Exhibition ==
From 18 November 2016 – 12 February 2017, the Bard Graduate Center exhibited Charles Percier: Architecture and Design in an Age of Revolutions. The exhibit examined Percier’s commissions that “significantly influenced decorative arts and architecture during an extremely turbulent and rapidly changing period in French history.” The exhibit was organized by Bard Graduate Center Gallery, the Réunion des Musées Nationaux—Grand Palais, and the Palace of Fontainebleau (exhibited 18 March – 19 June 2017). The catalogue was edited by Jean-Philippe Garric (ISBN 978-0-300-22158-9).

== Students ==
At the end of 1814, Charles Percier officially retired and devoted himself to teaching. The following are some of his students:

- Auguste Caristie (1783–1862)
- François Debret (1777–1850)
- Joseph-Louis Duc (1802–1879), prix de Rome 1825
- Martin-Pierre Gauthier (1790–1855), prix de Rome 1819
- Alphonse de Gisors (1796–1866), second prix de Rome 1823
- Jacques Hittorff (1792–1867)
- Jacques-Marie Huvé (1783–1852)
- Louis-Hippolyte Lebas (1782–1867)
- Achille Leclère (1785–1853)
- Paul Letarouilly (1795–1855)
- Auguste de Montferrand (1786–1858)
- Bruno Renard (1781–1861)
- Louis Visconti (1791–1853)

== See also ==
- List of Parisian structures commissioned by Napoleon I
