= Antoine-François Peyre =

French architect (1739–1823)

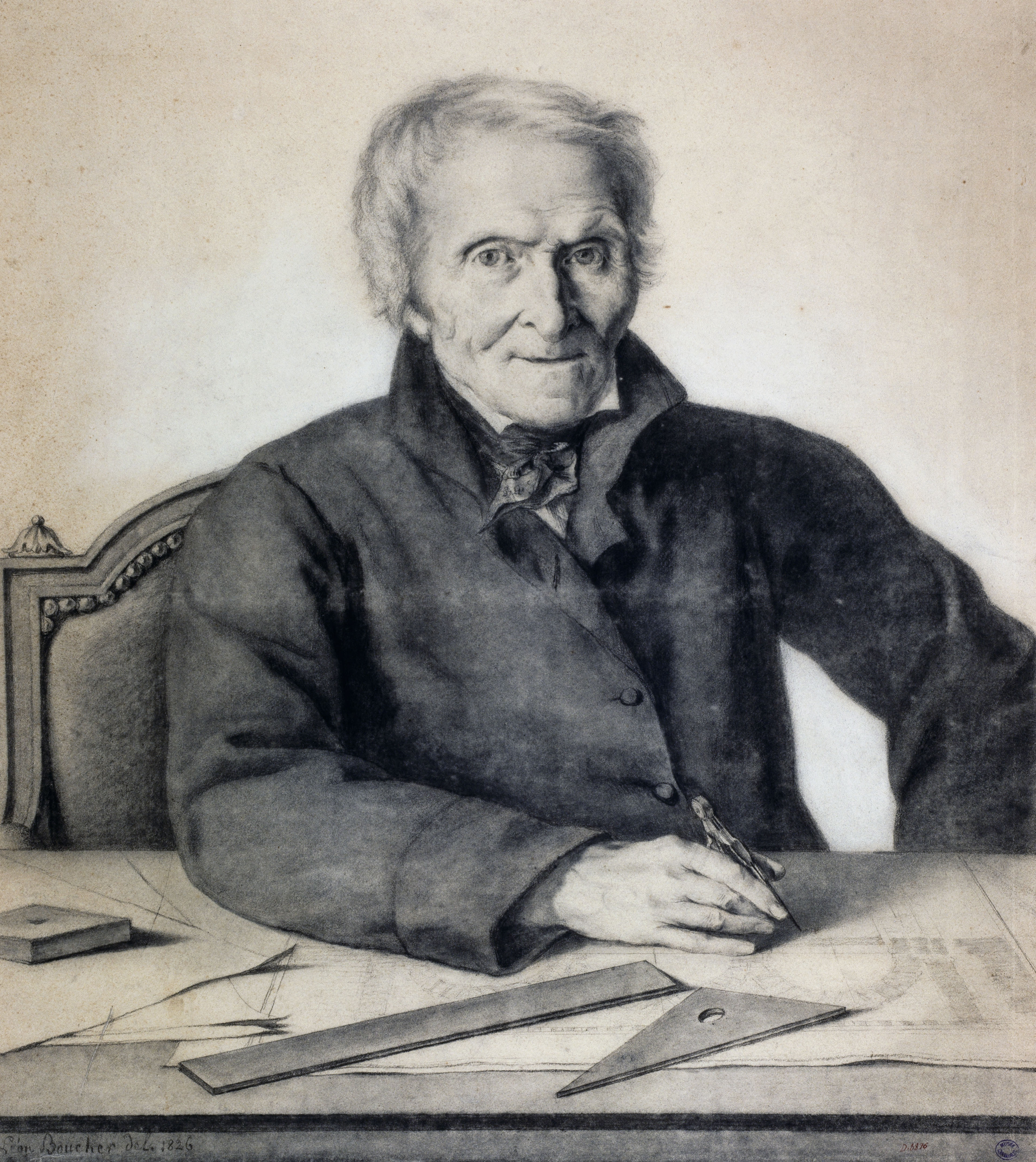
Antoine-François Peyre (posthumous portrait by Léon Boucher, 1826)

Antoine-François Peyre (5 April 1739, in Paris – 7 February 1823, in Paris) was a French architect; the younger brother of Marie-Joseph Peyre, and the uncle of Antoine-Marie Peyre.

== Biography ==
He won the Grand prix de l'Académie (later, the Prix de Rome) in 1762, eleven years after his brother, and went to stay at the Académie de France à Rome in 1766. There, he became close friends with a colleague, Antoine Joseph de Bourge, and married his sister, Sophie.

Upon his return, he was named an architect of the King's Buildings at Fontainebleau and Saint-Germain-en-Laye, where he created two convent chapels. In 1777, he was sent to Trier, to help Prince Clemens Wenceslaus of Saxony complete his Château in Koblenz. That same year, he entered the Académie Royale d'Architecture and later became a teacher there. His students included Charles Percier, Pierre-François-Léonard Fontaine, Antoine Vaudoyer and Louis-Pierre Baltard.

In the 1780s, he completed the chapel at the charity hospital in Saint-Germain-en-Laye (since destroyed), the Pavillon d'Angoulême, for Louis-Charles Guy, secretary to the Comte d'Artois (only the rotunda remains), and the chapel at the City Hall in Soissons.

His work for the Royal Family led him to be persecuted in the early stages of the French Revolution. He retired to the château de Fontainebleau, and was effectively a prisoner there during the Reign of Terror.

In 1795, he was elected to the Académie des Beaux-Arts; becoming the first to occupy Seat #2 for architecture. He remained active as an architect through 1812. His well-known projects included creating a new wing for the Château d'Écouen, to replace one that had been demolished to provide a better view (1802-1807), and interior remodeling at the Palais de la Légion d'honneur (1804-1812).

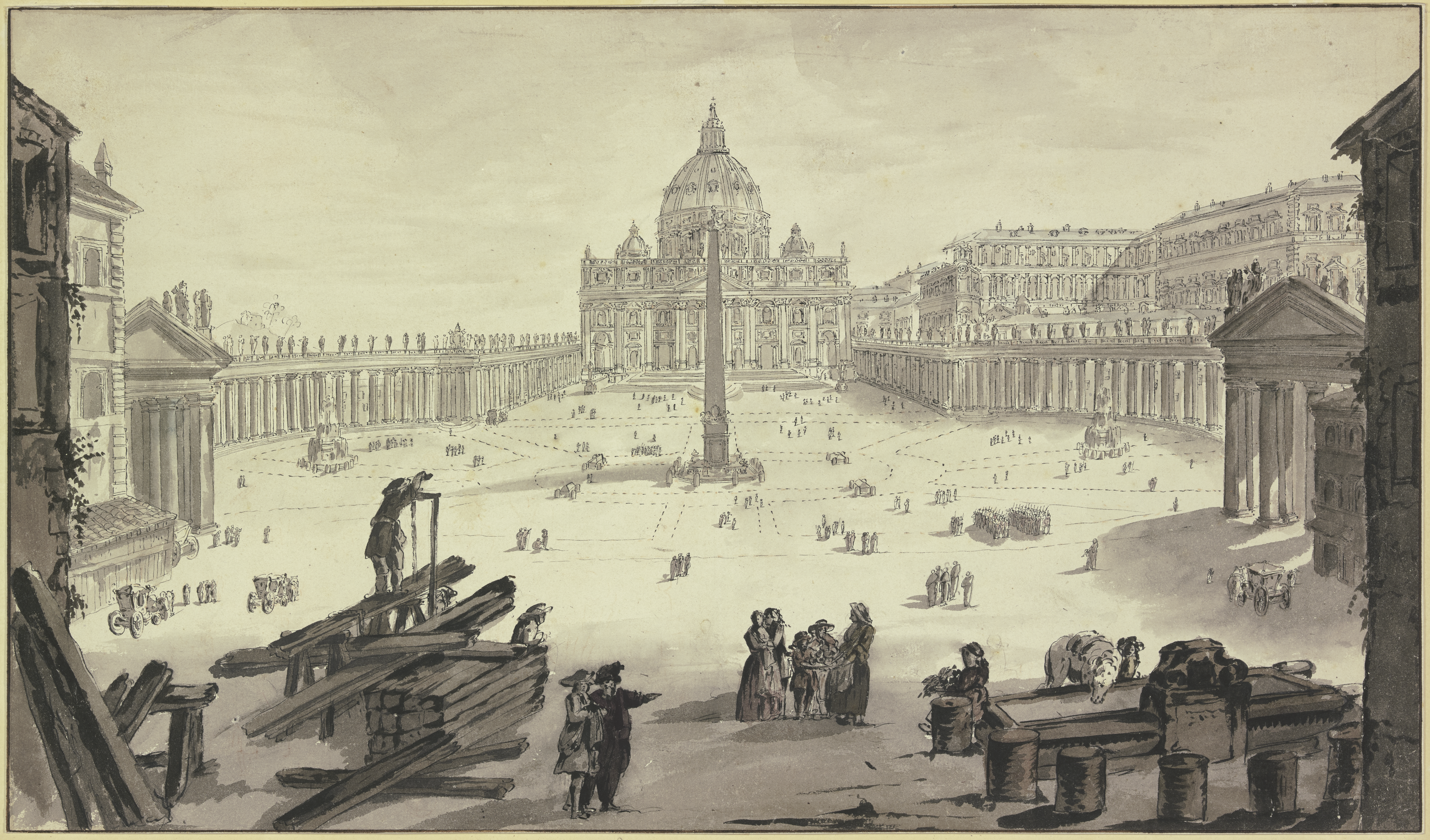
Sketch of St. Peter's Square, Rome
