= Londonderry Vase =

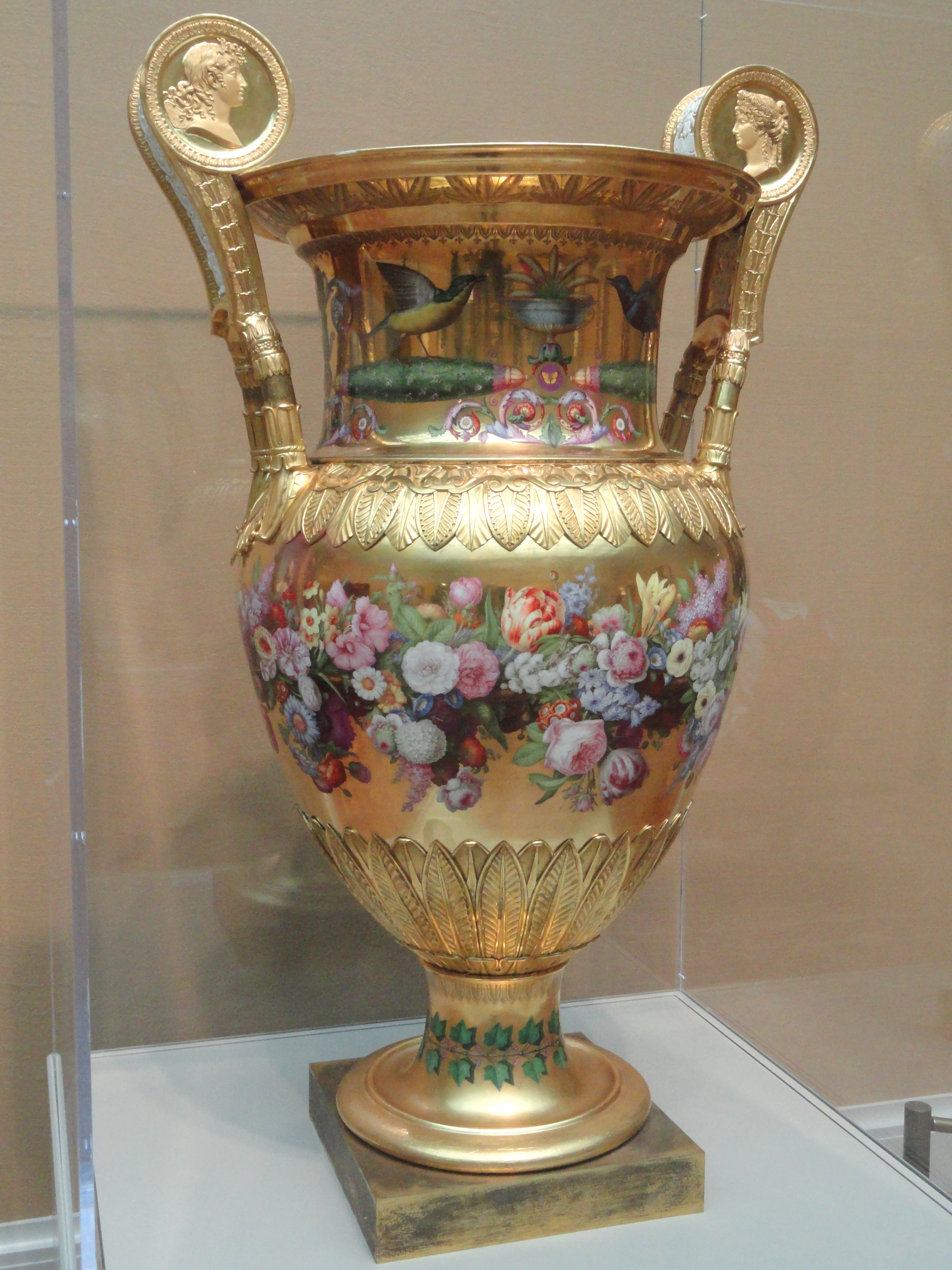
Londonderry Vase, 1813. Art Institute of Chicago, Chicago, Illinois, USA

The Londonderry Vase is a hard-paste porcelain vase, standing at 54 inches tall. It is decorated with polychrome enamels, gilding and gilt bronze mounts. It bears the Sèvres mark, two intersecting Ls with a letter in the center denoting its creation year (1813-1815) and a crown over the L's to mark it as hard-paste. The vase was commissioned by Napoleon around 1805 to be created by the Sèvres Manufactory. The vase is currently on display at the Art Institute of Chicago.

== Background ==
=== Creation and Design ===
The vase is created using hard-paste porcelain. Hard paste porcelain was not used at the Sèvres Manufactory until the mid-1700s when a large deposit of china clay, a vital ingredient, was found in Limoges, France. The vase is considered in the Etruscan form, due to the large scrolling handles, and was known as a vase étrusque á rouleaux in royal decrees and records surrounding the object. Once the vase was commissioned, various artists were brought in to decorate the lavish porcelain. The vase itself was designed by Napoleon's chief architect, Charles Percier (1764-1838). The decorations around the exterior of the vase were designed by Alexandre-Théodore Brongniart (d. 1813) and were executed by Gilbert Drouet (1785-1825) and Christophe-Ferdinand Caron (active 1792-1815).

=== Sèvres Manufactory ===
The Londonderry Vase was created in early 1814 by the Manufacture Nationale de Sèvres, located in Sèvres, just outside the southwest suburbs of Paris, France. The factory is one of the main porcelain manufacturers in Europe and has been creating porcelain since the early 18th century. It was created under the guidance of King Louis XV and Madame de Pompadour and was brought under the jurisdiction of the crown in 1759. It is still operating today and is now a public organization under the name "Sèvres: City of Ceramics". To this day, the ceramics are still created with the same mission as when the factory opened. The company strives to produce ceramics using artisanal techniques in the reproduction of modern and traditional designs. These products are displayed either in Sèvres or in a special gallery in the 1st district of Paris.

=== Vase Released to Monarchy ===
The vase was held at the Sèvres factory until 1814, after the exile of Napoleon. On July 2, 1814, the vase was "released to the government for presents" for 22,000 francs, with an additional 168,60 francs for packing. A royal decree transferred the vase to Charles Maurice Talleyrand, the Prince of Bénévent and foreign minister to King Louis XVIII. It was in the negotiations following the restoration of the French monarchy that the vase moved from its location in France to its place in Londonderry House, London.

=== Negotiations Following Napoleon's Exile ===
Following the crash of Napoleon's empire, the rest of Europe was anxious to start dividing up Napoleon's spoils of war. The Peace of Paris and the Congress of Vienna dissolved the empire and laid out the new terms for France. Two key figures in these negotiations were Talleyrand and the English Secretary of Foreign Affairs, Robert Stewart, Viscount Castlereagh, who would become the second Marquess of Londonderry. Talleyrand saw the influence Castlereagh had over the four major European powers; Britain, Prussia, Russia and Austria. It was common during this period for the defeated parties to give gifts or bribes to aid in negotiations. Talleyrand used the giving of the vase to Castlereagh as insurance that the needs of France would be seen to during these two large political negotiations. The gift of the vase from Talleyrand to Castlereagh is estimated to have happened around August 20, during two days of meetings leading up to the Congress of Vienna.

== Location ==
Once given to Viscount Castlereagh, the vase was housed in Londonderry House in the boudoir and ante-drawing room as recorded by the archivist of the Londonderry Estate in 1937. Following the sale of Londonderry House's contents, it was gifted by the Harry and Maribel Blum Fund and Harold L. Stuart Endowment to the Art Institute of Chicago in 1987. It is now housed in their European Decorative Arts Collection as a prime example of French Neoclassicism. It showcases the achievements of the Sèvres Manufactory and European porcelain as well as encapsulating an important turning point in French history.
