= Antoine Vaudoyer =

French architect

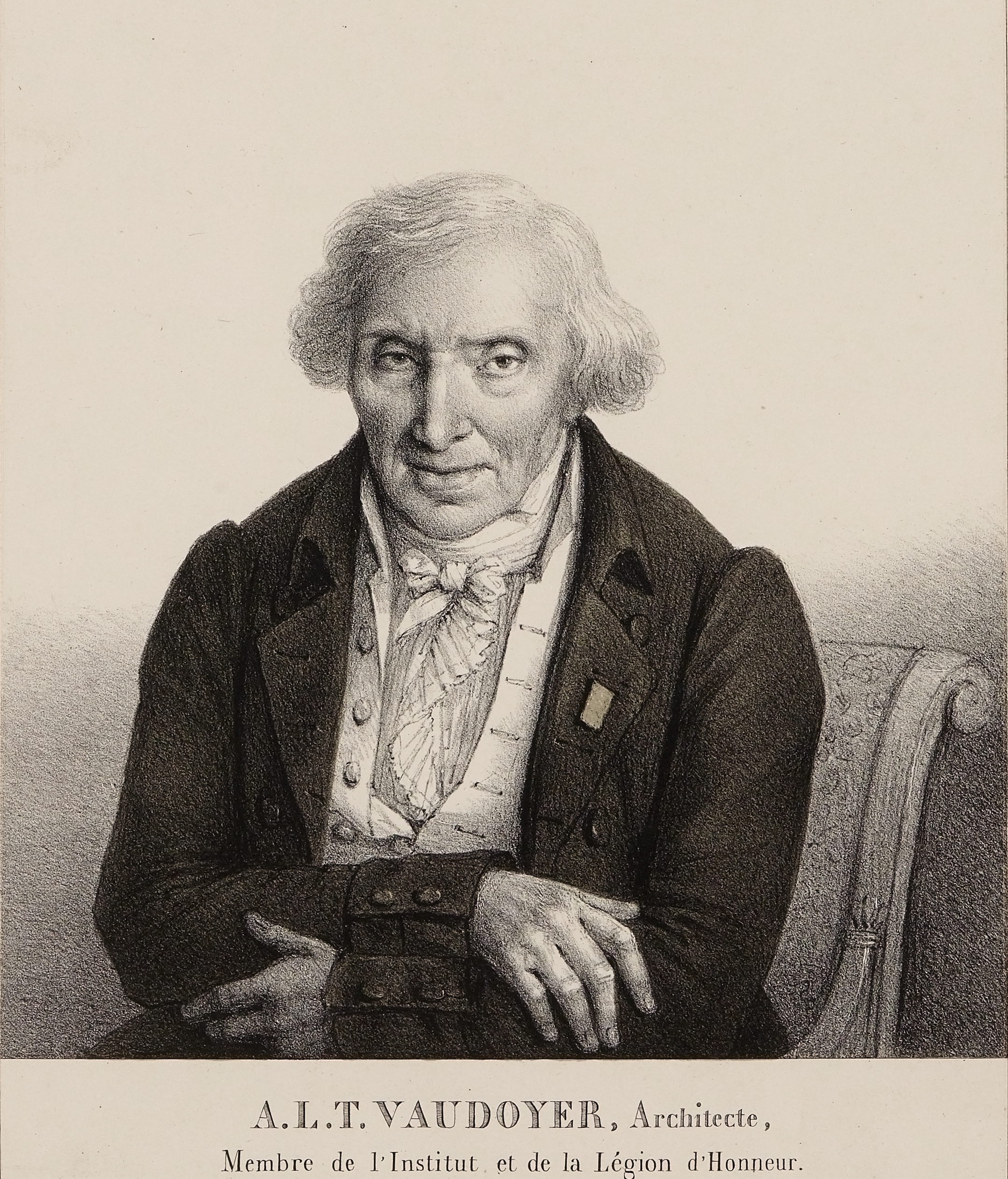
Antoine Vaudoyer, portrait by Jean-Henri Marlet (1844)

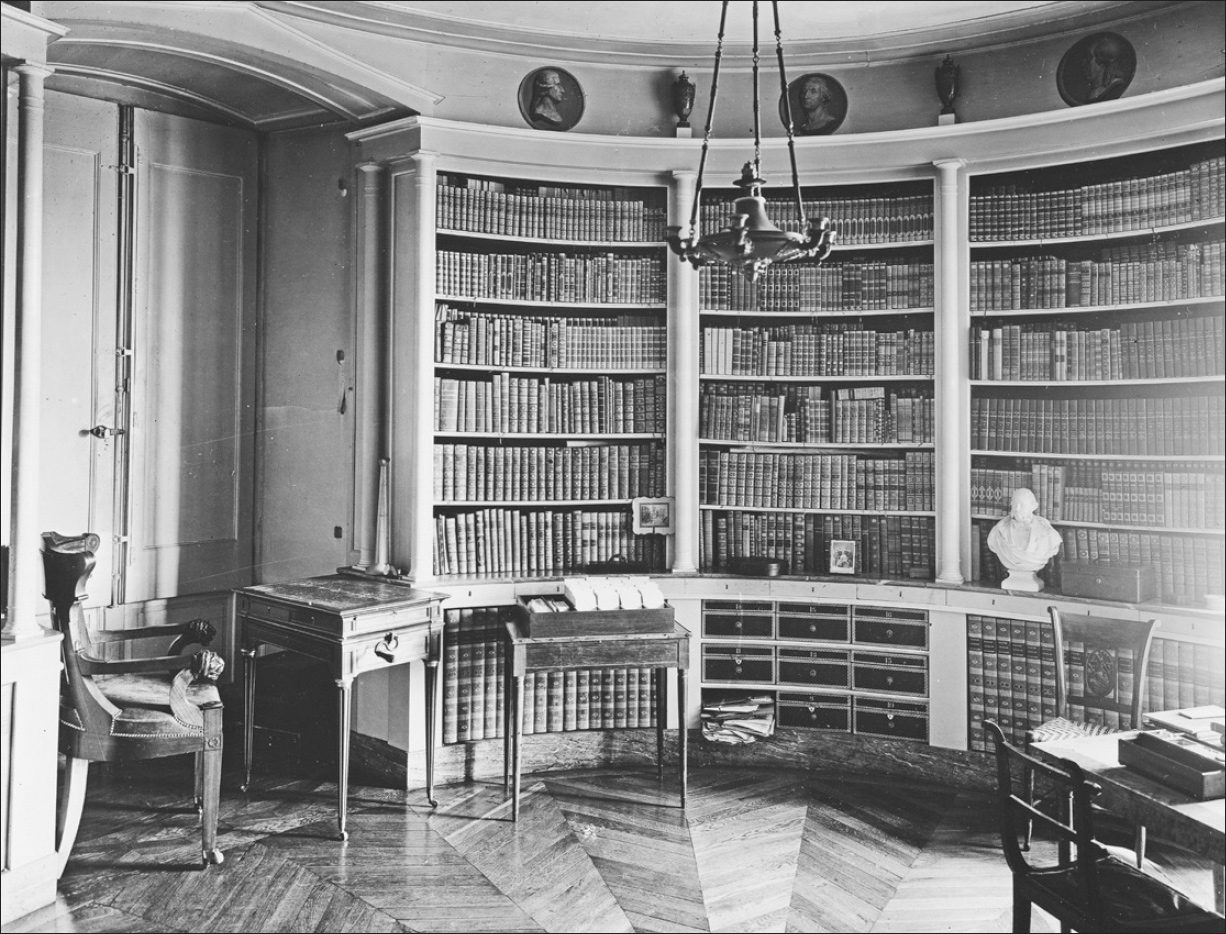
La Fayette's library at the Château de la Grange-Bléneau, designed by Vaudoyer

Antoine-Laurent-Thomas Vaudoyer (21 December 1756, Paris - 27 May 1846, Paris) was a French architect. He was married to Alexandrine-Julie Lagrenée, daughter of the painter, Louis Jean François Lagrenée. Their son, Léon, was also a well-known architect.

== Biography ==
following his father's wishes, he joined the Lorraine Dragoons, a cavalry regiment, in 1777. He had served for only one year when his father died, and he resigned. Free to pursue his own goals, he entered the workshops of Marie-Joseph Peyre, and attended classes at the Académie royale d'architecture. His design for a royal menagerie earned him the Grand prix d'Architecture (now the Prix de Rome) in 1783. Later that year, he left for a five-year stay at the Académie de France à Rome; in the Palazzo Mancini.

He returned to France in 1788. The following year, he opened a "free workshop" and began taking students. In 1791, when it was proposed that the Church of Sainte-Geneviève, recently completed, be transformed into what is now called the Panthéon, he expressed his strong opposition.

In 1792, the National Convention abolished the architecture academy. Vaudoyer joined with Julien-David Le Roy, a former Professor there, to open an independent school of architecture. Thanks to their efforts, the school survived until 1795, when it was officially recognized by the Interior Ministry. In 1796 the Minister, Pierre Bénézech, allowed competitions and prizes to be reestablished. Vaudoyer served as the secretary-archivist at the school; initially as a volunteer then, from 1807, as a paid employee. He was also appointed as one of six inspectors for the Council of Civic Buildings.

As architect of the Palais des Beaux-Arts, he worked on the extension of the Collège de France, and did restorative work at the Sorbonne. Later, he was in charge of the construction site for the Institut de France at the Collège des Quatre Nations. In 1810, he was appointed architect for the Musée des Monuments Français. More such official appointments followed, including the Marché des Carmes at the Place Maubert (1811), the Bibliothèque Sainte-Geneviève (1813), and the new École Royale des beaux-Arts (1816).

In addition to these projects, he maintained a studio at the École. He was named a member of the Académie des Beaux-Arts in 1823, where he took Seat #2 for architecture; succeeding Antoine-François Peyre (deceased).
