= Louis Lazare =

Louis Lazare (7 October 1811 - 12 March 1880) was a French writer, under the direction of the prefect of Rambuteau. Attached to the city archives during Haussmann's renovation of Paris under the Second French Empire, he was tasked with documenting that renovation in writing. He is particularly known for co-authoring with Felix Lazare the Administrative and Historical Dictionary of the Streets of Paris and its Monuments, published in 1844, which provides a very precise overview of the city's urban fabric just before Haussmann's urban projects.

In February 1880 he was made a member of the Société de l'histoire de Paris et de l'Île-de-France.

== Works ==
- Louis Lazare (1844). Dictionnaire administratif et historique des rues de Paris et de ses monuments..
- Louis Lazare (1852). Notice historique du cadran de la Tour de l'horloge du Palais de justice de Paris..
- Louis Lazare (1855). Dictionnaire administratif et historique des rues de Paris et de ses monuments..
- Louis Lazare (1856). Paris, son administration ancienne et moderne, études historiques et administratives..
- Louis Lazare (1856). Paris, son administration ancienne et moderne. Études historiques et administratives par Louis Lazare....
- Louis Lazare (1856). Paris, rive gauche, Xe arrondissement. Publications du syndicat. N° 1, Rapport sur l'ensemble des améliorations à exécuter dans le Xe arrondissement. M. Louis Lazare,....
- Louis Lazare (1856). Paris, rive gauche, Xe arrondissement. Publications du syndicat n° 1. Rapport sur l'ensemble des améliorations à exécuter dans le Xe arrondissement. M. Louis Lazare, rapporteur..
- Louis Lazare (1860). Nomenclature des rues, boulevards, quais, impasses, passages, monuments de la ville de Paris, indiquant la coïncidence des nouveaux arrondissements avec les anciens....
- Louis Lazare (1860). Nomenclature des rues, boulevards, quais, impasses, passages, monuments de la ville de Paris..
- Louis Lazare (1861). Réponse à M. le docteur Rigaud..
- Louis Lazare (1862). Rose de mai..
- Louis Lazare (1862). Publications administratives..
- Louis Lazare (1868). Les quartiers pauvres de Paris.
- Louis Lazare (1869). Les quartiers pauvres de Paris.
- Louis Lazare (1870). Les quartiers de l'est de Paris et les communes suburbaines..
- Louis Lazare (1870). Les quartiers pauvres de Paris.
- Louis Lazare (1872). La France et Paris.
- Louis Lazare (1879). Dictionnaire administratif et historique des rues et monuments de Paris..
- Louis Lazare. La Cité et les embellissements de Paris..
- Louis Lazare. De la circulation dans Paris..
- Louis Lazare. 19e Arrondissement. Rue B. Parties située entre la Rue Drouin-Quintaine (La Villette) et la Rue de Paris (Belleville)..

=== With Félix Lazare ===
- Nomenclature des rues, boulevards, quais, impasses, passages, monuments de la ville de Paris, 1860.
