= Galerie d'Orléans =

Former shopping arcade and present courtyard at the Palais-Royal in Paris

- The Galerie d'Orléans in 2009, with one of Pol Bury's fountains in the foreground

General information
- Type: Former shopping arcade, now a courtyard
- Location: Palais-Royal, 1st arrondissement of Paris, Paris, France
- Coordinates: 48.863734°N 2.337427°E
- Year built: 1829–1831 (Note: Giedion dates the arcade to 1829–1831. Geist gives 1828 for the start of construction and 1829 for completion.)

Design and construction
- Architect: Pierre-François-Léonard Fontaine

The Galerie d'Orléans is a courtyard and former shopping arcade in the Palais-Royal, in the 1st arrondissement of Paris, France. Designed by Pierre-François-Léonard Fontaine, it replaced the wooden shopping galleries that had separated the palace courtyard from the garden. Its central passage had a continuous glass vault, a form used in many later arcades. The shops and roof were removed in the 1930s. The surviving colonnades enclose an open space between the palace's main courtyard and garden.

== Location and design ==
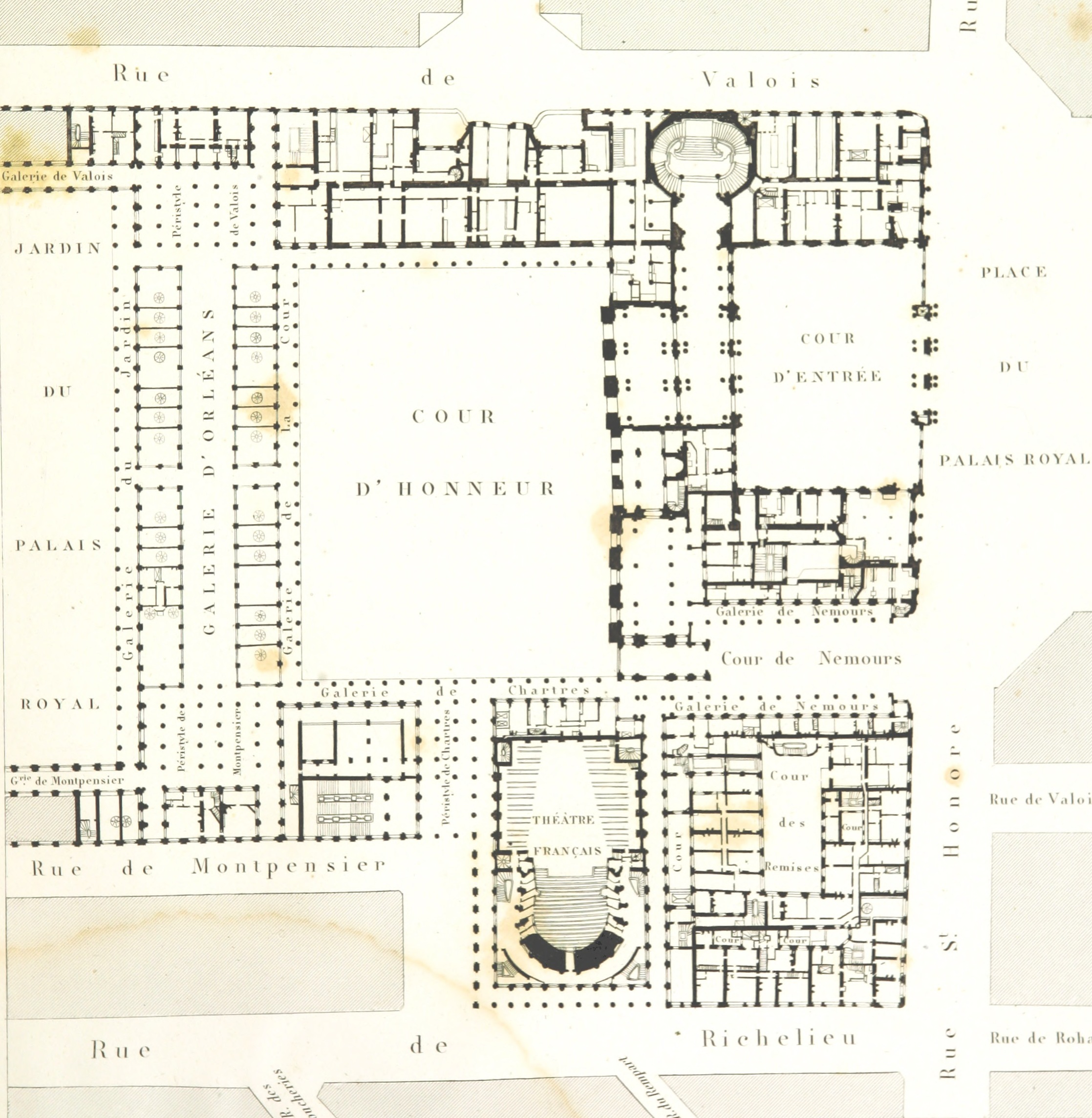
Mezzanine plan dated 1833, published in Fontaine's Histoire du Palais Royal (1834), plate 56. The Galerie d'Orléans is at the left, between the garden and the main courtyard. North is approximately to the left.

The gallery runs between the Péristyle de Valois on the east and the Péristyle de Montpensier on the west. It separates the Cour d'honneur, the palace's main courtyard, to the south from the garden to the north. The colonnade facing the garden is labelled Galerie du Jardin (Garden Gallery) on Fontaine's plan. Its counterpart facing the courtyard is labelled Galerie de la Cour (Courtyard Gallery). Their Doric columns support covered walks. These walks joined the existing palace colonnades to form a continuous circuit. The central passage opened into the peristyles at either end, which gave access to the neighbouring streets.

The original shopping arcade occupied the space between these colonnades. Shops stood on both sides of a broad central passage running from east to west. A narrower passage crossed it at the centre, connecting the main courtyard and the garden. The shops varied in size and had openings towards both the central passage and the outer colonnades. The central passage measured 65 by 8.5 m (213 by 28 ft). It was covered along its whole length by a continuous arched roof of glass and iron.

=== Shops and decoration ===
A café occupied six bays, the spaces between successive supports. Ten shops occupied two bays each, and fourteen additional ones consisted of a single bay. Each shop had a mezzanine above it and a cellar below. A cast-iron spiral staircase joined the three levels, winding around the flue of a stove in the cellar. Service passages beneath the outer colonnades also gave access to the cellars. The flues continued up to the roof's balustrade, a low railing, and discharged through candelabra.

The shop fronts alternated arches with full-height pilasters, flat projections resembling columns. These carried a Doric entablature, the horizontal band above the arches, topped by a balustrade. Marble and mirrors covered the pilasters, and the mouldings were gilded. Gas lamps on wall brackets lit both the interior and exterior of the arcade, with mirrors behind the lamps reflecting their light. The floor was marble, the door and window frames were brass, and the rails and lamp brackets were cast iron. The architectural historian Johann Friedrich Geist compared the arrangement of the interior facades with the Theatre of Marcellus and Palazzo Venezia in Rome.

=== Glass roof ===
The vault followed a segment of a circle and sloped down at its ends. A raised glazed section along its centre provided ventilation. Flat-iron arches were anchored to the pedestals of the balustrades and braced along the length of the passage. The panes fitted into cast-iron grooves. The low building preserved views between the palace and garden and avoided the shadow that Victor Louis's proposed taller wing would have cast. The design also provided a raised garden terrace reserved for the Duke of Orléans.

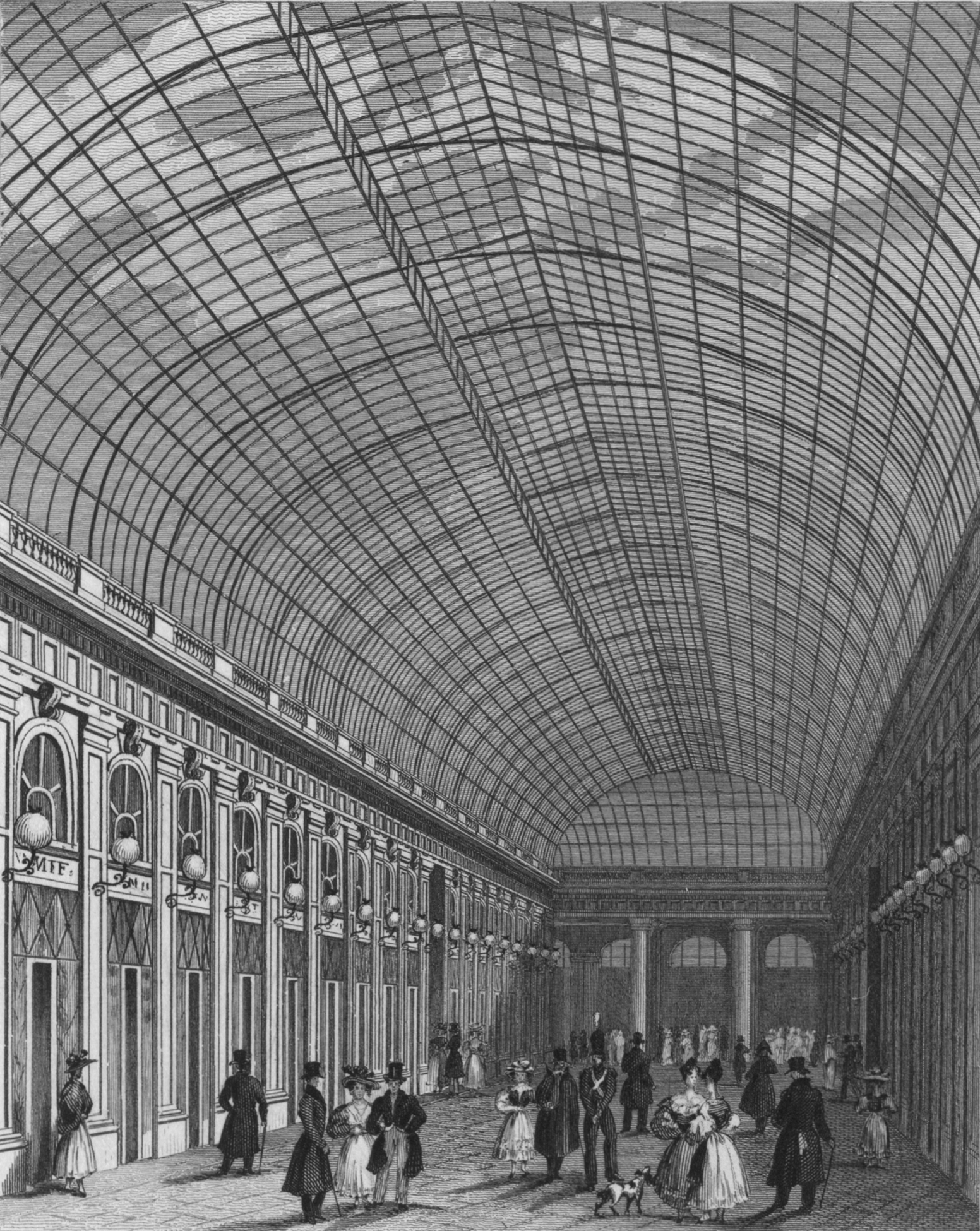
The covered arcade in an 1831 print

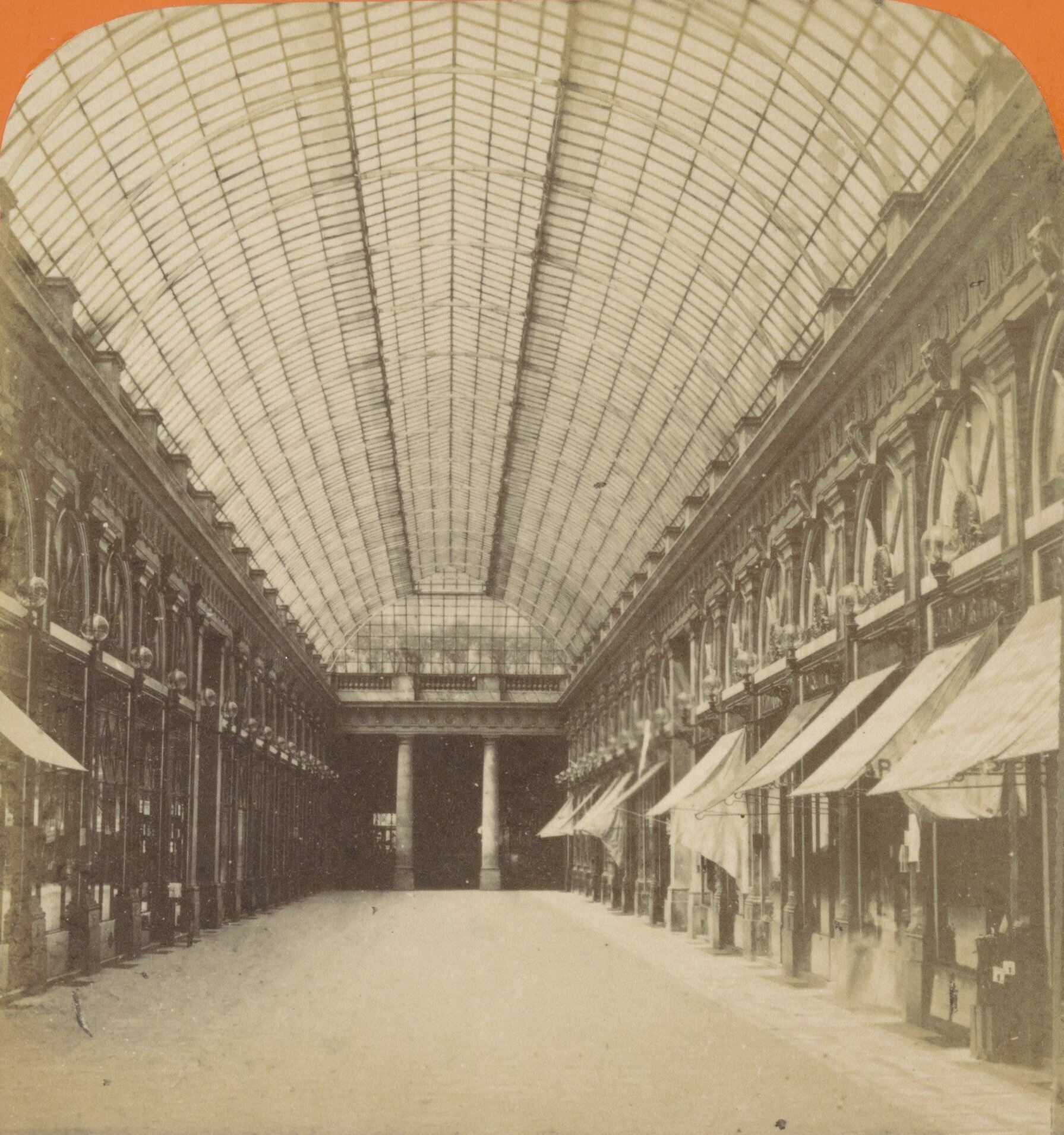
The arcade in a photograph of about 1860–1870

== History ==
=== Wooden galleries ===
In 1781, Philippe d'Orléans, then Duke of Chartres, commissioned Victor Louis to develop the land around the Palais-Royal garden. Buildings containing shops and housing were erected along three sides. A fourth wing was intended to separate the garden from the palace courtyard, but a shortage of funds prevented its completion.

Temporary wooden galleries were built on this side in 1786. Known as the Galeries de bois (Wooden Galleries), or Camp des Tartares (Tartar Camp), they contained two covered walkways lined with shops. Daylight entered through windows below the eaves. They were an early model for the covered passages of Paris.

=== Covered arcade ===
Louis Philippe, Duke of Orléans and later King of the French, commissioned Fontaine to complete the Palais-Royal. The Galerie d'Orléans replaced the wooden galleries as part of this work. Fontaine began restoring the palace in 1814. His work repaired damage from the Revolution and connected the older palace, the theatre and Victor Louis's buildings around the garden.

Geist dates the demolition of the wooden galleries, completion of the Péristyle de Valois and start of the new arcade to 1828. In his account, the arcade and its connection through the Péristyle de Montpensier were completed in 1829. Giedion gives the construction dates as 1829–1831. The new arcade was lit by gas. The German writer Ludwig Börne praised the brightness of the gaslit gallery and considered it much grander than earlier glazed passages.

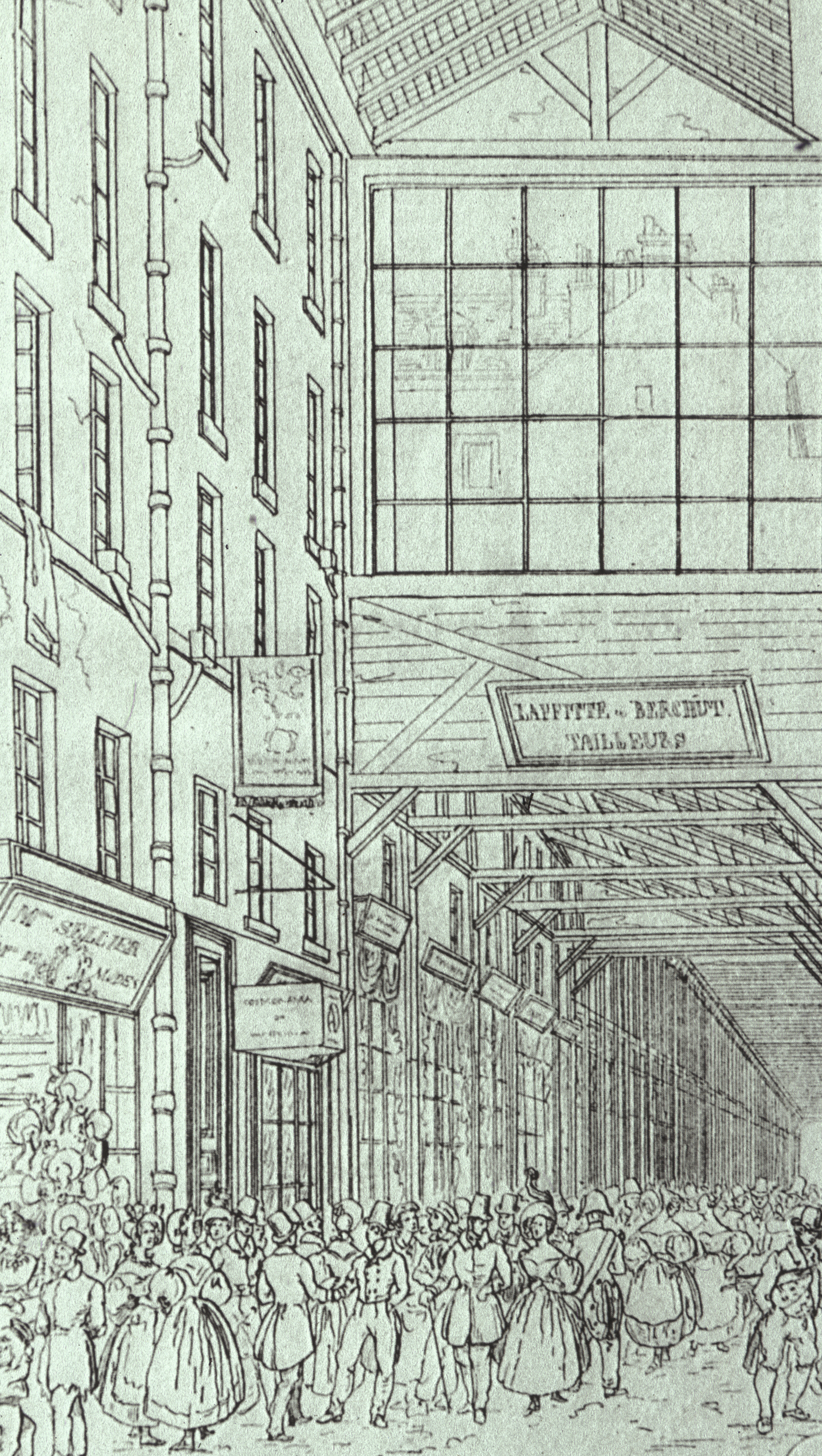
The wooden galleries, about 1828

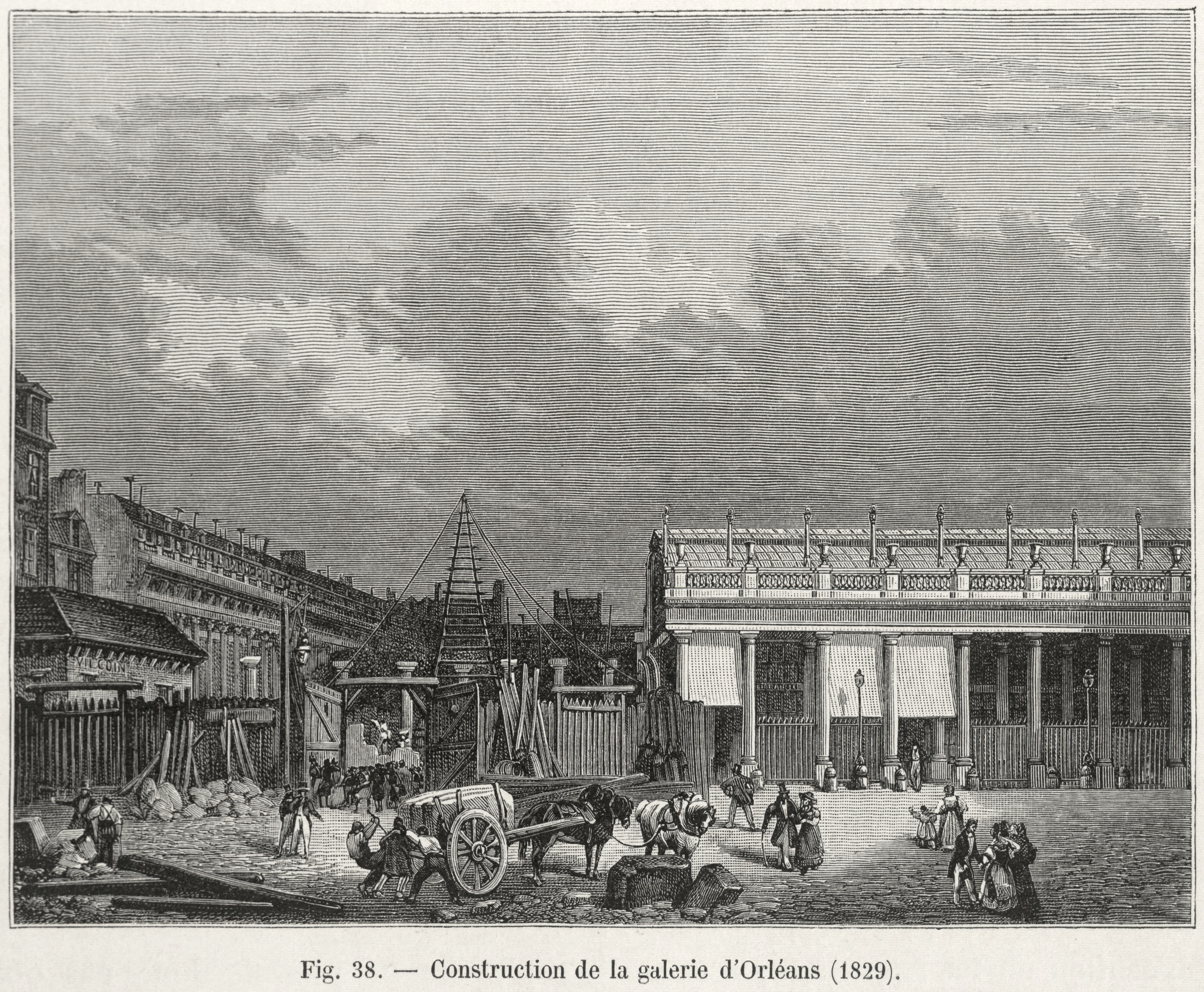
Construction in 1829, depicted in an illustration published between 1875 and 1882

Geist attributes the gallery's decline partly to its lack of a resident population, since it contained shops but no apartments. He also cites the police exclusion of prostitutes from the Palais-Royal in 1830, the closure of gambling rooms in 1836, and competition from the boulevards. He records the installation of a colonial museum in the gallery by the end of the nineteenth century. By 1908, the gallery housed the Office colonial (Colonial Office).

=== Open courtyard ===
The shops and glass roof were dismantled in the 1930s, leaving the two stone colonnades. (Note: Béatrice Méon-Vingtrinier and Geist date the dismantling to 1935. The Ministry of Culture's 2021 visitor guide gives 1933.) Two fountains by the Belgian sculptor Pol Bury were installed in 1985.

In 2012, the Comédie-Française opened a temporary wooden theatre in the gallery while its Salle Richelieu was being renovated. Called the Théâtre Éphémère (Temporary Theatre), it seated 750 people. It was designed by Florent Richard under the responsibility of Alain-Charles Perrot. The inauguration took place on 9 January 2012, and performances began on 11 January. It closed in March 2013.

== Architectural influence ==
Sigfried Giedion, an architectural historian, considered galleries of this kind to be a starting point for the spread of iron frame construction, including the railway stations. He also noted their further development in Italy. In his book on shopping centres, Peter Coleman counts the Galerie d'Orléans among the first arcades to have a glazed vault running unbroken from end to end. He writes that many later arcades followed the shape of its roof. Geist describes the gallery's glass vault as the first of its kind and pre-dating the vaulted conservatories. He identifies similar roof construction in later arcades in Brussels, The Hague and Hamburg.

According to Geist, the gallery's design had affected interiors and Roman-inspired facades of later arcades in Milan, Brussels and Hamburg. The knowledge about the arcade spread across Europe through engravings, Fontaine's published history of the Palais-Royal, and Thiollet's drawings of the building and its roof structure.

== See also ==
- Covered passages of Paris
