= Nichols (surname) =

Nichols is an English surname. It can be an anglicised form of the Scottish surname relating to Clan MacNeacail.

== Notable people with this surname ==
=== A ===
- Adam Nichols (born 1962), English footballer
- Adam Nichols (musician) (born 1991), British musician
- Al Nichols (1852–1936), American baseball player
- Allen Nichols (1916–1981), American football player
- Anne Nichols (1891–1966), American playwright
- Archibald Nichols (1819–1903), American politician
- Arthur Nichols (1858–?), Australian politician
- Arthur Nichols (cricketer) (1881–1937), Australian cricketer
- Arthur R. Nichols, American landscape architect
- Austin Nichols (born 1980), American actor

=== B ===
- Beverley Nichols (1898–1983), English author, playwright and public speaker
- Bilal Nichols (born 1996), American football player
- Bill Nichols (disambiguation), multiple people
- Billy Nichols (1940–2025), American guitarist and soul songwriter
- Bobby Nichols (born 1936), American golfer
- Bowyer Nichols (1859–1939), English poet
- Brian Nichols (born 1971), American convicted murderer

=== C ===
- Charles Archibald Nichols (1876–1920), American politician
- Charles August Nichols (1910–1992), American animator and film director
- Charlotte Nichols (born 1991), British politician
- Clarina I. H. Nichols (1810–1885), American journalist, lobbyist, and public speaker
- Clement Roy Nichols, Australian scout official

=== D ===
- Dan Nichols (born 1969), American Jewish rock musician
- Dandy Nichols (1907–1986), English actress
- Darlene Ka-Mook Nichols (born 1955), Native American activist and FBI informant
- David Nichols (disambiguation), multiple people
- David A. Nichols (1917–1997), American judge
- David C. Nichols (born 1950), American naval officer
- David E. Nichols (born 1944), American pharmacologist and medicinal chemist
- David Eccles Nichols (1873–1962), English violist
- David H. Nichols (1826–1900), American politician
- Deatrick Nichols (born 1994), American football player
- Dick Nichols (1926–2019), American banker and politician
- Dominic Nichols (born 2006), American football player
- Don Nichols (1924–2017), American motorsport entrepreneur
- Donald Nichols (American football) (1901–1978), American football player and lawyer
- Donald Nichols (spy) (1923–1992), American spy during and after the Korean War
- Donald G. Nichols (born 1931), American politician
- Dudley Nichols, (1895–1960), American screenwriter and director

=== E ===
- Ernest Fox Nichols (1869–1924), American educator and physicist
- Evan Nichols (born 2004), American sled hockey player

=== G ===
- George Nichols (disambiguation), multiple people
- George Elwood Nichols (1882–1939), American botanist and ecologist
- George Ward Nichols (1831–1885), American journalist
- Grace Nichols (born 1950), Guyanese poet

=== H ===
- Herbie Nichols (1919–1963), American jazz composer and pianist
- Horace Elmo Nichols (1912–2000), American jurist

=== J ===
- Jack Nichols (disambiguation), multiple people
  - Jack Nichols (painter) (1921–2009), Canadian painter
  - Jack Nichols (activist) (1938–2005), American LGBT activist
  - Jack Nichols (basketball) (1926–1992), American basketball player
  - Jack C. Nichols (1930–2007), American politician
- James Nichols (disambiguation), multiple people
  - James Nichols (born 1978), American convicted murderer
  - James D. Nichols (1928–2003), American horse jockey
  - James P. Nichols, American recording industry executive producer
  - James W. Nichols (born 1946), American farmer and politician
- Jennifer Nichols (born 1983), American Olympian archer
- Jesse Clyde Nichols (1880–1950), American urban planner
- Joe Nichols (born 1976), American country music artist
- Johanna Nichols (born 1945), American linguist and professor
- John Nichols (disambiguation), multiple people
  - John Nichols (journalist) (born 1959), American journalist and media activist
  - John Nichols (law enforcement officer), (1918–1998), American law enforcement officer and politician
  - John Nichols (politician) (1834–1917), American politician
  - John Nichols (printer) (1745–1826), English printer and author
  - John Nichols (writer) (1940–2023), American novelist
  - John B. Nichols (1931–2004), United States Navy aviator and author
  - John Bowyer Nichols (1779–1863), English printer and antiquary
  - John G. Nichols (1812–1898), businessman, builder, and politician
  - John Noel Nichols (1883–1966), English wholesaler, inventor of the soft drink Vimto
  - John Treadwell Nichols (1883–1958), American ichthyologist and ornithologist
- Jon Nichols (born 1981), English footballer
- Jonathan Nicols (disambiguation), multiple people
  - Jonathan Nichols (Rhode Island politician) (1681–1727), American politician
  - Jonathan Nichols (American football) (born 1981), American football player
  - Jonathan Nichols (Oklahoma politician) (1965–2019), American politician
  - Jonathan Nichols Jr. (1712–1756), American politician
- Joy Nichols (1925–1992), Australian radio and stage performer
- Joyce Nichols (1940–2012), American physician assistant

=== K ===
- Kathleen Nichols, American computer scientist
- Kelly Nichols (born 1956), American pornographic actress
- Keith Nichols (1945–2021), English jazz multi-instrumentalist and arranger
- Kenneth Nichols (1907–2000), American army officer and civil engineer
- Kid Nichols (1869–1953), American baseball player
- Kyra Nichols (born 1958), American ballet dancer and teacher

=== L ===
- Lawrence T. Nichols (born 1947), Professor of Sociology at West Virginia University
- Larry D. Nichols (born 1939), American puzzle enthusiast and designer
- Lew Nichols III (born 2001), American football player
- Luke Nichols (born 1978), American YouTube personality

=== M ===
- Malcolm Nichols (1876–1951), American journalist and politician
- Marie Hochmuth Nichols (1908–1978), American rhetorical critic
- Marisol Nichols (born 1973), American actress
- Mark Nichols (disambiguation), multiple people
  - Mark Nichols (curler) (born 1980), Canadian curler
  - Mark Nichols (American football) (born 1959), American football player
  - Mark Nichols (golfer) (born 1965), English golfer
  - Mark Nichols (composer) (born 1964), American playwright, composer and lyricist
  - Mark Nichols (journalist) (1873–1961), Canadian newspaper journalist and editor
- Mary Ann Nichols (1845–1888), British murder victim killed by Jack the Ripper
- Mary Perot Nichols (1927-1996), former columnist and city editor of The Village Voice, served twice as head of the Municipal Broadcasting System
- Mike Nichols (1931–2014), American film director
- Mike J. Nichols, American film editor
- Minerva Parker Nichols (1863–1949), American architect
- Mitch Nichols (born 1989), Australian footballer
- Monae' Nichols (born 1998), American athlete
- Moses Nichols (1740–1790), American physician and soldier

=== N ===
- Nathaniel B. Nichols (1914–1997), American control engineer
- Nichelle Nichols (1932–2022), American actress and singer

=== P ===
- Peter Nichols (disambiguation), multiple people
  - Peter Nichols (author) (born 1950), American author
  - Peter Nichols (playwright) (1927–2019), English playwright
  - Peter Nichols (journalist) (1928–1989), English newspaper journalist and author

=== R ===
- Rachel Nichols (actress), American actress and model
- Rachel Nichols (journalist) (born 1973), American journalist and sportscaster
- Rayshad Nichols (born 1998), American football player
- Rebecca S. Nichols (1819–1903), American poet
- Reginald Gordon Nichols (1888–1960), Anglican clergyman in Melbourne, Victoria
- Red Nichols (1905–1965), American jazz cornetist
- Reid Nichols (born 1958), American baseball player and coach
- Robert Nichols (disambiguation), multiple people
  - Robert Nichols (actor) (1924–2013), American actor
  - Robert Nichols (author) (1919–2010), American poet, playwright, novelist, and landscape architect
  - Robert Nichols (poet) (1893–1944), English poet
  - Robert Nichols (politician) (born 1944), American politician
- Rob Nichols (born 1969), American association executive and former public official
- Robbie Nichols (1946–2011), American football player
- Robbie Nichols (ice hockey) (born 1964), Canadian ice hockey player and coach
- Roger Nichols (musical scholar) (born 1939), English musicologist, critic, translator and author
- Roger Nichols (songwriter) (1940–2025), American composer and songwriter
- Roger Nichols (recording engineer) (1944–2011), American recording engineer
- Ross Nichols (1902–1975), English academic and poet
- Roy Nichols (1932–2001), American country music guitarist
- Ruth Nichols (born 1948), Canadian author
- Ruth Rowland Nichols (1901–1960), American aviation pioneer

=== S ===
- Sam Nichols (1829–1913), American politician
- Sue C. Nichols (1965–2020), American artist
- Stan Nichols (1900–1961), English cricketer
- Stephen Nichols (born 1951), American actor
- Steve Nichols (born 1947), American car engineer and designer

=== T ===
- Taylor Nichols (born 1959), American actor
- Ted Nichols (born 1928), American composer, conductor and arranger
- Terry Nichols (born 1955), American domestic terrorist
- Thomas Nichols (disambiguation), multiple people
  - Thomas Nichols (pirate) (fl. 1717–1718), pirate in the Caribbean and off the American east coast
  - Thomas E. Nichols, American statistician
  - Tom Nichols (footballer) (born 1993), English footballer
  - Tom Nichols (academic) (born 1960), American academic

=== V ===
- Vincent Gerard Nichols (born 1945), British Roman Catholic prelate

=== W ===
- William Nichols (disambiguation), multiple people

=== Fictional characters ===
- Jennifer Nichols, fictional character in the television show, The Brady Bunch
- Josh Nichols, fictional character in the series Drake and Josh
- Walter Nichols, fictional character in the series Drake and Josh
- Zach Nichols, a fictional character in the television series Law & Order: Criminal Intent
