= Nichols House =

Nichols House may refer to:

in Australia

- Nichols House, Eltham, Melbourne

in the United States

(by state then city)

- Nichols House (Trinidad, Colorado), listed on the National Register of Historic Places (NRHP) in Las Animas County
- George Pickering Nichols House, Thompson, Connecticut, listed on the NRHP in Windham County
- Nichols Farms Historic District, Trumbull, Connecticut, listed on the NRHP in Fairfield County
- Harry H. Nichols House, Maywood, Illinois, listed on the NRHP in Cook County
- J.L. Nichols House and Studio, Bloomington, Indiana, listed on the NRHP in Monroe County
- Oscar Nichols House, Davenport, Iowa, listed on the NRHP in Scott County
- Samuel Nichols House, Nichols, Iowa, listed on the NRHP
- William Anzi Nichols House, Winterset, Iowa, listed on the NRHP
- Nichols House (Ponchatoula, Louisiana), listed on the NRHP in Tangipahoa Parish
- Capt. John P. Nichols House, Searsport, Maine, listed on the NRHP in Waldo County
- Nichols House (Baltimore, Maryland)
- Hooper-Lee-Nichols House, Cambridge, Massachusetts, listed on the NRHP
- Nichols House (Newton, Massachusetts), listed on the NRHP
- Daniel Nichols Homestead, Reading, Massachusetts, listed on the NRHP
- James Nichols House, Reading, Massachusetts, listed on the NRHP
- John F. Nichols House, Somerville, Massachusetts, listed on the NRHP
- Richard Nichols House, Reading, Massachusetts, listed on the NRHP
- Nichols-Sterner House, Richmond, Massachusetts, listed on the NRHP
- Nichols Farm District, Cedar Grove, Missouri, listed on the NRHP
- Marion Nichols Summer Home, Hollis, New Hampshire, listed on the NRHP
- William Nichols Cobblestone Farmhouse, Benton, New York, listed on the NRHP
- Doc Nichols House, Durham, North Carolina
- Walter Nichols House, Elyria, Ohio, listed on the NRHP in Lorain County
- Eli Nichols Farm, Howard, Ohio, listed on the NRHP in Coshocton County
- John H. Nichols House, Wapakoneta, Ohio, listed on the NRHP in Auglaize County
- Nichols House (Dayton, Oregon), listed on the NRHP in Yamhill County
- Dr. A. S. Nichols House, Portland, Oregon, listed on the NRHP in Multnomah County
- Dr. Herbert S. Nichols House, Portland, Oregon, listed on the NRHP in Multnomah County
- Nichols House (East Barre, Vermont), listed on the NRHP in Washington County
- Edward Nichols House, Leesburg, Virginia, listed on the NRHP in Loudoun County
- John T. and Margaret Nichols House, Allouez, Wisconsin, listed on the NRHP in Brown County
- Frank Eugene Nichols House, Onalaska, Wisconsin, listed on the NRHP in La Crosse County
