= Thomas Nichols =

Thomas or Tom Nichols may refer to:

- Thomas Nichols (pirate) (fl. 1717–1718), pirate in the Caribbean and off the American east coast
- Thomas Reid Nichols (born 1958), American baseball player
- Tom Nichols (footballer) (born 1993), English footballer
- Tom Nichols (academic) (born 1960), American academic
- Thomas E. Nichols, American statistician
- T. L. Nichols (Thomas Low Nichols), American physician, journalist and writer
- Thomas Nichols, brother of Nichelle Nichols and member of Heaven's Gate who died in the cult's 1997 mass suicide

== See also ==
- Thomas Nichols Three Deckers, historic houses in Taunton, Massachusetts, United States
- Thomas Nicholls (disambiguation)
- Thomas Nicolls, English MP
- Nichols (surname)
- Nichols (disambiguation)
