= Nichols =

Nichols may refer to:

== People ==
- Nichols (surname)
- Nichol, a surname

== Places ==
=== Canada ===
- Nichols Islands, Nunavut

=== United States ===
- Nichols, California, an unincorporated community
- Nichols Canyon, Los Angeles, California
- Nichols, Connecticut
- Nichols Farms Historic District, a village within Trumbull, Connecticut.
- Nichols, Iowa
- Nichols (village), New York
- Nichols (town), New York
- Nichols, South Carolina, a town
- Nichols, Wisconsin, a village
- Nichols Shore Acres, Wisconsin, an unincorporated community

== Military ==
- Nichols Field, a former U.S. air base in the Philippines
- Nichols' Regiment of Militia, a U.S. Revolutionary War unit
- Camp Nichols, a historic fortification in Cimarron County, Oklahoma

== Organisations ==
=== Education ===
- Nichols College, in Dudley, Massachusetts
- Nichols School, in Buffalo, New York
- Nichols Hall, Kansas State University
- Nichols House (Baltimore, Maryland), home of the president of Johns Hopkins University
- Nichols Arboretum, Ann Arbor campus of the University of Michigan

=== Companies ===
- Nichols plc, a British soft drinks company
- Nichols Industries, Inc., an American cap gun manufacturer

== Other ==
- Nichols (TV series), a 1971 television show
- Nichols House (disambiguation), various houses of on the National Register of Historic Places
- Nichols Bridgeway, a pedestrian bridge in Chicago, Illinois
- Nichols railway station, a Philippine National Railways station
- Nichols plot, a plot used in signal processing and control design
- Harvey Nichols, a luxury department store based in the United Kingdom

== See also ==
- Nicholls (disambiguation)
- Nickel (disambiguation)
- Justice Nichols (disambiguation)
