= Nicholl =

Nicholl is a surname. Notable people with the surname include:

- Andrew Nicholl (1804–1886), Irish artist
- Anthony Nicholl (died 1658), English politician
- Billie Nicholl (c. 1851–1937), New Zealand prospector and gold mine developer
- Charles Nicholl (1870–1939), Welsh rugby union player
- Charles Nicholl (author), English historian and biographer
- Chris Nicholl (1946–2024), Northern Ireland soccer player
- David Nicholl (neurologist), British neurologist
- David Nicholl (rugby union) (1871–1918), Welsh rugby union player
- Don Nicholl (1925–1980), British-American screenwriter and producer
- Donald Nicholl (1923–1997), British historian and theologian
- Edward Nicholl (1862–1939), British officer of the Royal Naval Reserve
- Emily Nicholl (born 1994), Scottish netball player
- Frederick Nicholl (1814–1893), English lawyer and cricketer
- George Nicholl (1832–1913), British academic
- Hazelton Nicholl (1882–1956), Royal Air Force officer
- Iltid Nicholl (c. 1776/77–1844), Welsh lawyer
- James Nicholl (1890 – c. 1955), Scottish footballer
- Jimmy Nicholl (born 1956), Canadian-Northern Ireland soccer player
- John Nicholl (mariner) (fl. 1605–1637?), English mariner and author
- John Nicholl (judge) (1759–1838), Welsh MP for Penryn and judge
- John Nicholl (antiquary) (1790–1871), English antiquary
- John Iltyd Nicholl (1797–1853), Welsh MP for Cardiff and judge
- Kate Nicholl (born 1988), Lord Mayor of Belfast
- Kenneth Nicholl (1885–1952), English cricketer
- Liz Nicholl (born 1952), Welsh netball player and sports administrator
- Louise Townsend Nicholl (1890–1981), American poet and editor
- Margaret Suzanne Nicholl (1897–1983), American missionary
- Mary De la Beche Nicholl (1839–1922), British lepidopterist and mountaineer
- Peter Nicholl (born 1944), New Zealand economist
- Robert Nicoll (1814–1837), Scottish poet, sometimes spelled Nicholl
- Sam Nicholl (1869–1937), American Baseball player
- Samuel Joseph Nicholl (1826–1905), English architect
- Terry Nicholl (born 1952) English footballer
- Tony Nicholl (1916–1999), Maltese footballer
- Warwick Nicholl, New Zealand athlete
- William Nicholl (1868–1922), English rugby union footballer

== See also ==
- Nicholl–Lee–Nicholl, an algorithm named after Tina M. Nicholl and Robin A. Nicholl
- Nicholl Head, a location in Antarctica
- Nicholl Range, a mountain range in British Columbia, Canada
