= John Nicholl =

John Nicholl may refer to:

- John Nicholl (mariner) (fl. 1605–1637?), English mariner and author
- John Nicholl (judge) (1759–1838), Welsh MP for Penryn and judge
- John Nicholl (antiquary) (1790-1871), English antiquary
- John Iltyd Nicholl (1797–1853), Welsh MP for Cardiff and judge

== See also ==
- John Nichol (disambiguation)
- John Nicholls (disambiguation)
