= John Nichol =

John Nichol may refer to:

- John Pringle Nichol (1804–1859), Scottish scientist; mentor to William Thomson
- John Nichol (biographer) (1833–1894), Scottish biographer
- John Nichol (footballer) (born 1879), English footballer (Grimsby Town)
- John Nichol (RAF officer) (born 1963), RAF navigator shot down and taken prisoner during the first Gulf War
- John Lang Nichol (born 1924), Canadian Senator
- John Nichol, fictional character from DC Comics going by the alias of Doctor Polaris

== See also ==
- John Nicoll (disambiguation)
- John Nicholl (disambiguation) (earlier biographies and sources use both spellings)
- John Nichols (disambiguation)
- Johnny Nicol (born 1938), jazz singer
