= Nickel (disambiguation) =

Nickel is a chemical element.

Nickel may also refer to:

== People ==
- Nickel (surname)
- Nickel Ashmeade (born 1990), Jamaican athlete
- Nickel Chand (born 1995), Fijian footballer
- Nickel Hoffmann (1536–1592), German stonemason

== Coins ==
- Nickel (Canadian coin), a five cent coin introduced in 1922
- Nickel (United States coin), a five cent coin introduced in 1866
- Half dime, a U.S. five cent coin produced in various years in the range 1792–1873 (sometimes called a "nickel" due to its face value)
- Three-cent nickel, a U.S. coin (1865–1889)
- Indian Head cent, a U.S. coin (1859–1864) nicknamed the "nickel"

== Sports ==
- Nickel defense, a defense formation in American and Canadian football
- Nickel Trophy, awarded to the winner of the football game between North Dakota State University and the University of North Dakota

== Other uses ==
- Nickel Theatre, St. John's, Newfoundland, Canada
- Nickel Film Festival, St. John's, Newfoundland
- Nickel, a character from the second season of Battle for Dream Island, an animated web series

== See also ==
- Nikel, a small city in Russia
- Nickle (disambiguation)
- Nickels (disambiguation)
- Nichol, a surname
- Nichols (disambiguation)
- Nicole (disambiguation)
