= Garnet Porter =

American journalist (1866–1945)

Garnet Clay Porter (May 27, 1866 – March 6, 1945) was an American-born journalist and newspaper editor in Manitoba, Canada. He was also known as "the Colonel".

He was born in Russellville, Kentucky. Before coming to Canada, he was a legal counsel, Kentucky outlaw, soldier of fortune and Yukon prospector. Porter also served with Teddy Roosevelt's Rough Riders. He was named a colonel and aide to the governor in Kentucky after backing the right candidate for state governor while he was a newspaper editor. Porter came to Toronto in 1900 and worked as a reporter for The Toronto World until 1904, when he became editor-in-chief for the Calgary Herald. In 1906, he joined the staff of the Winnipeg Telegram, where he was news editor, then managing editor and finally editor-in-chief. His daughter, identified as “Miss Porter” in (CP) The Story of The Canadian Press (Ryerson Press, 1948) by M. E. Nichols (Mark Nichols) was hired as a stenographer in 1907 at a rate of $5 a week.

While editor at the Telegram, Porter wrote a story calling bank-robber Jack Krafchenko a crook. The next day, Krafchenko, armed with a Luger, confronted Porter in his office. Porter was able to distract Krafchenko and pull out his own gun. He then made Krafchenko drop his weapon and leave the office.

In 1916, Porter left the Telegram to start his own news service. He also worked as a freelance reporter for various newspapers, including the Vancouver Daily Province, Montreal Star and Toronto Evening Telegram. In 1920, when the Telegram merged with the rival Winnipeg Tribune, Porter began working for the Tribune.

Later in life, he continued to write a column for the Saturday Tribune called "The Old-Timer Talks" and also wrote crime stories for detective magazines. Porter died in his sleep at home in Winnipeg at the age of 78.
