= James H. Wise (politician) =

American politician (1912–1976)

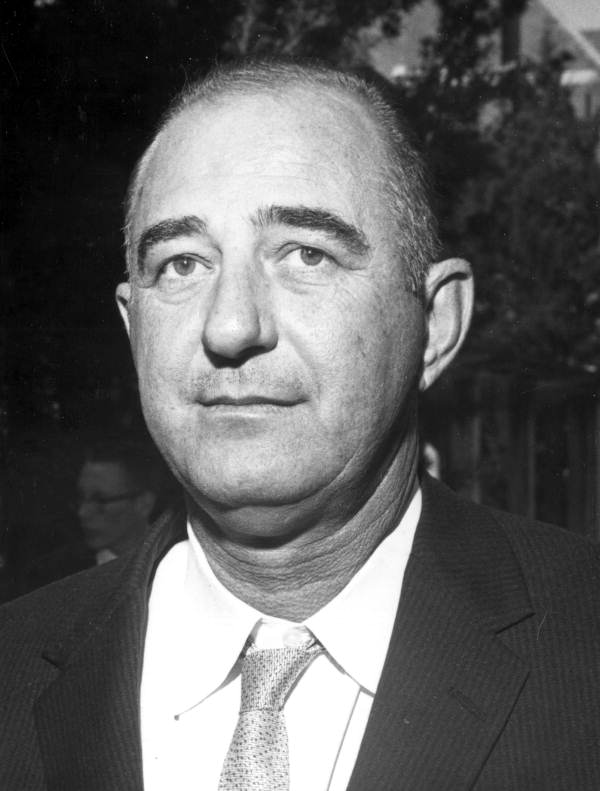
- Wise in 1961

Member of the Florida House of Representatives from Okaloosa County
- In office 1949–1950
- Preceded by: Herbert Coy Barnhill
- Succeeded by: Ferrin Campbell
- In office 1957–1965 Serving with Charles D. Stewart; Jack C. Nichols; Maurice McLaughlin

Personal details
- Born: July 15, 1912 Abbeville, Alabama, U.S.
- Died: February 9, 1976 (aged 63)
- Party: Democratic

James H. Wise (July 15, 1912 – February 9, 1976) was an American politician. A member of the Democratic Party, he served in the Florida House of Representatives from 1949 to 1950 and again from 1957 to 1965.
