= David Nicholls =

David Nicholls may refer to:

- David Nicholls (cricketer) (1943–2008), Kent cricketer
- David G. Nicholls, professor of biology
- David Nicholls (footballer, born 1956), English footballer
- David Nicholls (footballer, born 1972), Scottish footballer
- David Nicholls (racehorse trainer) (1956–2017), English jockey and racehorse trainer
- David Nicholls (theologian) (1936–1996), author in the fields of political theology and Caribbean Studies
- David Nicholls (musicologist) (born 1955), English academic and composer
- David Nicholls (writer) (born 1966), English novelist and screenwriter
- David Shaw Nicholls (born 1959), Scottish architect

== See also ==
- David Nicholl (disambiguation)
- David Nichols (disambiguation)
- Dave Nichol (1940–2013), Canadian product marketing expert
- David Nicolle (born 1944), British historian
