= David Nichol =

David Nichol may refer to:

- Dave Nichol, Canadian businessman and product marketing expert
- David Nichol (cricketer), Scottish cricketer

== See also ==
- David Nicholl (disambiguation)
