= Asterix and the Vikings =

2006 Danish animated adventure film

- French theatrical release poster
- Directed by: Stefan Fjeldmark; Jesper Møller
- Written by: Jean-Luc Goossens; Stefan Fjeldmark
- Additional dialogue by: Philip LaZebnik
- Based on: Asterix and the Normans by René Goscinny; Albert Uderzo
- Produced by: Natalie Altmann; Thomas Valentin
- Starring: Sean Astin; Brad Garrett; Paul Giamatti; Evan Rachel Wood; Greg Proops
- Narrated by: Jeff Bennett
- Edited by: Martin Wichmann Andersen; Anders Hoffmann
- Music by: Alexandre Azaria
- Production companies: M6 Studio; Mandarin SAS; 2d3D Animations; A. Film A/S; TPS Star
- Distributed by: SND (France); SF Film (Denmark)
- Release date: April 12, 2006
- Running time: 78 minutes
- Countries: France; Denmark
- Language: English
- Box office: $22.5 million

Asterix and the Vikings (French: Astérix et les Vikings; Danish: Asterix og Vikingerne) is a 2006 English-language French-Danish animated adventure film based on the French comic book series Asterix, written by Stefan Fjeldmark and Jean-Luc Gossens, and directed by Fjeldmark and Jesper Møller. A loose adaptation of the story of the comic album Asterix and the Normans, written by René Goscinny and illustrated by Albert Uderzo, the plot follows Asterix and Obelix trying to train the nephew of their village's chief, only to find themselves rescuing him from a tribe of vikings who believe him to be a Champion of Fear. This is the last traditionally animated theatrical Asterix animated film.

The ensemble voice cast features Roger Carel and Jacques Frantz as Asterix and Obelix, with Paul Giamatti and Brad Garrett headlining the English dub. Unlike most Asterix films, the film was produced in English first and the voice cast consisted of American actors. This adaptation introduced new characters, anachronistic references about modern technology, and cover versions of pop songs, such as "Get Down on It" by Kool and the Gang, "Eye of the Tiger" by Survivor and "Super Freak" by Rick James.

== Plot ==
A succession of raids leaves a tribe of Vikings without anyone to fight against them. The tribe's adviser, Cryptograf, concludes that their enemies have all fled, stating that "fear gives you wings". The Viking's chief, Timandahaf, misinterprets his adviser's words and declares they must find a "Champion of Fear", believing that if the tribe were to become great cowards, they'll be able to fly and become invincible. Cryptograf, secretly wishing to seize power from Timandahaf, goes along with it and declares that they'll find who they seek within Gaul. While en route, Timandahaf is shocked to learn that his daughter Abba snuck aboard disguised as a man, after he refused to take her with him. Despite being angry, he reluctantly keeps her among his crew.

Meanwhile, in the rebel village of the Gauls, the villagers welcome the arrival of chief Vitalstatistix's nephew Justforkix, who is to be trained to be a man. However, his nephew is more interested in chasing girls, using a bird to send messages to them, and is a vegetarian, much to the shock of Obelix. Obelix and Asterix attempt to train him to be a warrior, but lack success because of his pacifist nature and his refusal to drink the village's magic potion, which gives the villagers their super-human strength. When the Vikings arrive near their village, Cryptograf explains to his incredibly stupid son Olaf that he could claim Abba as his wife if he were to capture the Champion, thus putting him next in line as the tribe's chief, with his father secretly calling the shots.

When Olaf captures Justforkix, after witnessing his cowardice, Asterix and Obelix find themselves having to rescue him before his father visits their village. Travelling to Norway, the pair attempt to rescue Justforkix. However, he refuses to leave as he has fallen in love with Abba and she with him. When the vikings test Justforkix's flying skills by throwing him from a cliff, Cryptograf secretly rigs up a rope to him that causes him to be suspended in the foggy air. Tricked into believing he is the Champion, the Vikings rush to Olaf's wedding ceremony, leaving Justforkix to be rescued by Asterix and Obelix. Before they can take him back to Gaul, Justforkix secretly takes some magic potion, and swims back to the Viking's village.

Despite the risk, Justforkix rescues Abba, managing to fly by making an improvised hang-glider from a ship's mast and sail. While Cryptograf and Olaf are shunned for their deception, the Vikings travel back to the Gauls' village to celebrate the wedding of Justforkix and Abba. When Cacofonix decides to sing during the ceremony, the Vikings finally experience real fear and make a run for it. When Asterix asks him what fear is good for, Getafix explains how real courage means overcoming fears.

== Cast ==
Character	Original	French Dub
Justforkix	Sean Astin	Lorànt Deutsch
Justforkix	Sean Astin	Matt Pokora (singing, uncredited)
Obelix	Brad Garrett	Jacques Frantz
Asterix	Paul Giamatti	Roger Carel
Abba	Evan Rachel Wood	Sara Forestier
Olaf	Diedrich Bader	Michel Vigné
Unhygienix	Diedrich Bader	Bernard Métraux
Dogmatix	Dee B. Baker	Roger Carel
SMS Pigeon	Dee B. Baker	Barbara Tissier
Getafix	Jeff Bennett	Vania Vilers
Narrator	Jeff Bennett	Pierre Tchernia
Doublehelix	Corey Burton	Luc Florian
Impedimenta	Grey DeLisle	Marion Game
Fulliautomatix	John DeMita	Pascal Renwick
Nescaf	John DeMita	Philippe Catoire
Timandahaf	John DiMaggio	Marc Alfos
Fotograf	Jack Fletcher	Bruno Dubernat
Caraf	Jack Fletcher	Patrick Borg
Cacofonix	Jess Harnell	Bernard Alane
Vitalstatistix	Daran Norris	Vincent Grass
Cryptograf	Greg Proops	Pierre Palmade
Dubbledekabus	Dwight Schultz	Roland Timsit
Vikea	April Winchell	Brigitte Virtudes
Geriatrix	Philip Proctor	Gérard Surugue
Viking Boys	Jill Talley	Jules Azem
Viking Boys	Jill Talley	Victor Naudet
Oleaginus	Jonathan Nichols (Olibrius)	Stéphane Fourreau
Pirate Lookout	David Rasner	Med Hondo
Gauls	Philip Proctor	Stevens Thuilier
Gauls	Jonathan Nichols	Estelle Simon
Captain Redbeard	Jack Fletcher	Unknown

== Reception ==
Critical reaction to Asterix and the Vikings was generally mixed, with much praise on the animation and voice acting, but with criticisms on the film's script.

== Box office ==
- In the Netherlands, the film has grossed a total of € 361,747. The Dutch name for the film is "Asterix en de Vikingen".

== See also ==
- List of Asterix films
