= The Sea Voyage =

Play by John Fletcher and Philip Massinger

The Sea Voyage is a late Jacobean comedy written by John Fletcher and Philip Massinger. The play is notable for its imitation of Shakespeare's The Tempest. The play was licensed for performance by the Master of the Revels on 22 June, 1622. The play was entered into the Stationers' Register on 4 September, 1646, and received its initial publication in the first Beaumont and Fletcher folio of 1647.

The main characters are the French pirate captain Albert and his current love interest Aminta. Before the play's events, Albert had captured Aminta. He fell in love with his captive and promised to search for her missing brother on her behalf. When Albert's ship is caught in a storm, the crew struggles to reach a nearby island for refuge. They are unaware that the island is inhabited by two Portuguese castaways, stranded there due to a previous pirate attack. The Portuguese men impress the French crew with the treasure which they had managed to salvage, but then hijack Albert's ship and sail away. The French crew realize that the island is bleak and inhospitable, and they are soon suffering severely from hunger and thirst. Three of them are considering human cannibalism as an option, attempting to kill and eat Aminta. Unfortunately for them, Albert protects the damsel in distress.

Albert swims to a nearby island and makes contact with a community of misandrist Amazons who live there. The Amazons realize that they need men to propagate a new generation, and the younger women are eager for sexual contact. Their middle-aged leader allows them to choose partners among the French crew. The leader's daughter Clarinda falls for Albert, creating a love triangle between Albert, Aminta, and Clarinda. The Frenchmen accidentally offend the Amazons by trying to court them with jewels which once belonged to them. The situation is resolved when Aminta's brother Raimond arrives in the islands. Portuguese colonists and French pirates initiate peaceful relationships, Raimond and Clarinda become lovers, and Albert and Aminta are allowed to marry each other.

== Plot ==
The play opens on a ship at sea, caught in a storm; the ship's Master and sailors struggle to cope, while the vessel's commander and passengers make their way on deck. Albert, a French pirate, is the captain; he is accompanied by a heterogeneous group of compatriots, including Lamur, a "usuring Merchant," Franville, "a vain-glorious gallant," and Morillat, "a shallow-brain'd Gentleman." Also present are the captain's friend Tibalt, and his love interest, Aminta. Aminta was captured by Albert, but he has since fallen in love with her, and respects her virtue and chastity. He also set out in search of her missing brother Raimond, before the storm struck.

The ship struggles to reach a nearby island; the crew toss overboard cargo, belongings, even treasure, in an attempt to lighten the load. The second scene shifts perspective to two men stranded on the same island. Two Portuguese castaways, Sebastian and his nephew Nicusa, have long suffered privation on this barren rocky island; they watch as the ship endures the storm, and they see the survivors make their way to the beach. Their conversation reveals that they were victims of a pirate attack, which divided them from another Portuguese ship that carried Sebastian's wife and other members of their family.

The Frenchmen meet Sebatian and Nicusa, but behave with hostility and menace; while the French fall to fighting over treasure the two Portuguese have salvaged, Sebastian and Nicusa escape in the Frenchmen's ship, leaving the new arrivals behind. The French crew find that the island is as bleak and inhospitable as Sebastian and Nicusa had indicated; they are soon suffering severely from hunger and thirst. There is abundant material concerning this privation, perhaps intended as comedy; at one point, Lamure, Franville and Morillat (brawling, cowardly, greedy, selfish, etc. represent man's base instincts) are ready to kill Aminta and eat her, before she is rescued by Tibalt and Albert.

Sebastian and Nicusa had informed the French that they sometimes heard sounds of other people, but were never able to locate and reach these mysterious individuals. Albert and Aminta also hear these sounds, and Albert swims across a "hellish river" to find them, though he is suffering from wounds sustained in brawls with Franville and company. (The geography of the play's fictional location is confused at best; the islands are separated by a river, or else a "black lake".) The people Albert finds are a community of women, living without men like Amazons. Led by a fifty-year-old woman named Rosilla and her daughter Clarinda, the women have developed a strongly misandrist ideology under their leader's tutelage; but they also realize that they need men to propagate a new generation, and the younger women are curious about, and eager for contact with, the new arrivals. Rosilla bows to the popular will enough to allow some contact: the women can meet the men, choose partners from among them if they will; of any children born from such contact, the girls will be kept and the boys returned to their fathers. Clarinda is excited about this arrangement, since she has fallen in love with Albert—which creates a conflict with Albert's commitment to Aminta. And there is much flirting and chivalric-style courtship among the men and women.

The plan quickly falls through when the Frenchmen try to court the women with jewels taken from Sebastian's treasure – and the women recognize their own possessions. The Amazons imprison the men, and appear to be planning their execution. But a new ship arrives to change the situation. Aminta's brother Raimond has captured/rescued Sebastian and Nicusa while searching the seas for Aminta. Sebastian and Rosilla are husband and wife, and the two branches of their family are happily re-united. It is revealed that the Portuguese colonists in the New World have been oppressed by French pirates, which generated the initial conflict situation. Along with the reunion of Sebastian and Rosilla, Raimond and Clarinda form a couple, which helps to palliate the resentments of the two groups, French and Portuguese; and Albert and Aminta are free to marry as well.

== Short duration and special effects ==
The Sea Voyage is one of the shortest plays in the canon of Fletcher and his collaborators; The Tempest, concomitantly, is the second-shortest play in Shakespeare's collected works. The reason may be that both plays devote a greater-than-usual proportion of their theatrical space and time to their special effects.

== Performance and publication ==
The Sea Voyage was licensed for performance by the Master of the Revels on 22 June 1622. The Sea Voyage was acted by the King's Men; the second Beaumont/Fletcher folio of 1679 provides a partial cast list of the original production, which includes Joseph Taylor, William Ecclestone, Nicholas Tooley, John Lowin, and John Underwood, all members of the troupe.

The play was entered into the Stationers' Register on 4 September 1646, and received its initial publication in the first Beaumont and Fletcher folio of 1647.

== Authorship ==
The shares of the two collaborators, Massinger and Fletcher, are relatively easy to distinguish, due to Fletcher's distinctive pattern of linguistic usages. Cyrus Hoy observed that Fletcher's hand dominates in Acts I and IV, as Massinger's does in Acts II, III, and V. There is some crossover in the portions, though scholars are divided as to whether the play was revised into its final form by Fletcher (as Hoy thought), or by Massinger.

== Sources ==
The play begins with a storm, and features a desert island and castaways at a banquet, just as in The Tempest. In addition to Shakespeare's play, the collaborators consulted recent accounts of actual explorations, including those of William Strachey and John Nicholl.

== After 1660 ==
In the Restoration era, The Sea Voyage was revived by the King's Company in an adaptation called The Storm. The adapted version premiered on 25 September 1667, with both King Charles II and Samuel Pepys in the audience, as Pepys records in his Diary. Pepys liked the play so much – especially the added songs and dances – that he saw it again the next evening. The King's Company staged the play to beat the competition: William Davenant's and John Dryden's adaptation, The Tempest, or The Enchanted Island, would premier on 7 November the same year. Another adaptation of The Sea Voyage, titled The Commonwealth of Women, was produced by Thomas d'Urfey in 1685. D'Urfey's bawdy version of the play proved even more popular after the turn of the eighteenth century, being performed in 1702, 1707, 1708, and 1710. D'urfey made the hero an Englishman instead of a Frenchman, and an honest pirate to boot, anticipating Gilbert and Sullivan's The Pirates of Penzance by nearly two centuries. The original play was performed in 2020 at the American Shakespeare Center's Blackfriars Playhouse.

== Critical responses ==
Along with Fletcher's The Island Princess, The Sea Voyage has attracted the attention of some late twentieth century critics and scholars as part of the literature of colonialism and anti-colonialism.
