= John Nichols =

John Nichols may refer to:

- John Nichols (printer) (1745–1826), English printer and author
- John Nichols (law enforcement officer), (1918–1998), American law enforcement officer and politician
- John Bowyer Nichols (1779–1863), English printer and antiquary, son of the above
- John Gough Nichols (1806–1873), son of John Bowyer Nichols, English printer and antiquary
- John G. Nichols (1812–1898), mayor of Los Angeles
- John Nichols (politician) (1834–1917), U.S. Representative from North Carolina
- John Nichols (Worcestershire cricketer) (1878–1952), English cricketer
- John Treadwell Nichols (1883–1958), American ichthyologist
- John Conover Nichols (1896–1945), United States Representative from Oklahoma
- John B. Nichols (1931–2004), aviator and writer
- John Nichols (writer) (1940–2023), author of The Milagro Beanfield War
- John Nichols (journalist) (born 1959), American journalist and media activist
- John F. Nichols, U.S. National Guard general and Adjutant General of Texas
- John Nichols (British Army officer) (1896–1954)
- John A. Nichols, American farmer and politician from New York
- John J. Nichols, United States Air Force general
- John Nichols (diplomat), British diplomat and Ambassador to Switzerland
- John Nichols (discus thrower), winner of the 1989 NCAA DI discus championship
- John Nichols, former member of the indie rock band Low

== See also ==
- Jon Nichols (born 1981), English footballer
- John H. Nichols House, historic building in Wapakoneta, Ohio
- Jack Nichols (disambiguation)
- John Nichol (disambiguation)
- John Nicholls (disambiguation)
