= Eleanor Townsley =

Australian-American academic

- Born: Australia
- Occupations: Professor, Associate Dean, Department Chair
- Board member of: ISA RC16 Sociological Theory Research Committee
- Awards: MHC Award for Service; Andrew W. Mellon Professor of Sociology

Academic background
- Education: University of California, Los Angeles (MA, PhD); University of Queensland (BA)
- Thesis: Academics and the U.S. government in the 1960's: professionalization and perceptions of power (1996)

Academic work
- Discipline: Sociologist
- Sub-discipline: Cultural Sociology; Trope Theory; Social Change; Sociology of intellectuals; Economic sociology
- Institutions: Mount Holyoke College

Eleanor Townsley is an Australian-American academic, sociologist, and professor of sociology. She is the Andrew W. Mellon Professor of Sociology and Director of Nexus Programmes at Mount Holyoke College (MHC). She has served as Associate Dean of Faculty and as the chair of the Sociology Department at MHC. She is a CCS Faculty Fellow at the Center for Cultural Sociology at Yale University. Townsley is the co-chair of the International Sociological Association RC16 Sociological Theory Research Committee and a program coordinator for the XXI ISA World Congress of Sociology 2027.

Townsley was named one of "The Best 300 Professors" by the The Princeton Review.

Townsley's academic interests and areas of research include Cultural sociology, Trope Theory, sociology of intellectuals and intellectualism, economic sociology, history of sociology, and Sociology of gender.

== Biography ==
Townsley, originally from Australia, completed their Bachelors in 1988 at the University of Queensland. She would later complete her master's degree and PhD (1996) at the University of California, Los Angeles.

She began working as a professor of sociology at MHC in 1996. She was named director of Nexus Programmes in 2013. She has also taught courses in gender studies. She has taught "Introduction to Sociology," among other sociology classes, every semester since she began teaching at MHC; she calls it one of her favorite classes that she teaches. Townsley also teaches classes in sociology of media, social thought, sociological fieldwork, sociology of algorithms, sociology of organisations, contemporary sociology, data analysis, and cultural sociology.

In 2005, Townsley was awarded the Mount Holyoke College Faculty Teaching Award. In 2025, she was awarded the Mount Holyoke College Award for Service.

As the director of Nexus – a pre-professional concentration and track, Townsley coordinates the annual LEAP Symposium, a conference for Nexus students and students receiving "Lynk" internship funding to present on summer internships, jobs, and projects. Townsley and Assistant Professor of Sociology Ben Gebre-Medhin began the "Multidisciplinarity, Measurement & Meaning METRICS Lab" in 2022.

Townsley has published 4 books and has had research published in journals in the United States, Germany, and Canada. Her book with Ronald N. Jacobs, Living Sociologically: Concepts and Connections is a required textbook in international sociology curriculums. Her 2003 journal article "On Irony: An Invitation to Neoclassical Sociology" was republished and featured as part of Thesis Eleven's "Thesis Eleven 40th Birthday: The Top 40" issue.

== Publications ==
=== Books ===
- Townsley, Eleanor; Eyal, Gil; Szelenyi, Ivan (1998). Making Capitalism without Capitalists: Class Formation and Elite Struggles in Post-Communist Central Europe. Verso. ISBN 1859848192. LCCN 98030214. OCLC 39505512. OL 369553M.
- Townsley, Eleanor; Eyal, Gil; Szelenyi, Ivan (Mar 17, 2001). Making Capitalism without Capitalists: The New Ruling Elites in Eastern Europe. Verso. ISBN 9781859843123. OL 8624197M.
- Jacobs, Ronald N.; Townsley, Eleanor (6 October 2011). The Space of Opinion: Media Intellectuals and the Public Sphere. Oxford University Press. doi:10.1093/acprof:oso/9780199797929.001.0001. ISBN 9780199797929.
- Townsley, Eleanor; Jacobs, Ronald N. (2019). Living Sociologically: Concepts and Connections. Oxford University Press. ISBN 9780199325948. OL 33733224M.

=== Chapters ===
- Townsley, Eleanor (2012). "Media, Intellectuals, the Public Sphere, and the Story of Barack Obama in 2008". In Alexander, Jeffrey C.; Jacobs, Ronald N.; Smith, Philip (eds.). The Oxford Handbook of Cultural Sociology. Oxford University Press. ISBN 9780195377767.
- Townsley, Eleanor (November 2015). "Public Intellectuals, Media Intellectuals, and Academic Intellectuals: Comparing the Space of Opinion in Canada and the United States". In Keren, Michael; Hawkins, Richard (eds.). Speaking Power to Truth: Digital Discourse and the Public Intellectual. AU Press. doi:10.15215/aupress/9781771990332.01. ISBN 9781771990332.
- Townsley, Eleanor (April 2023). "Media Metacommentary, Mediatization, and the Instability of Expertise". In Eyal, Gil; Medvetz, Thomas (eds.). The Oxford Handbook of Expertise and Democratic Politics. Oxford University Press. pp. 530–556. doi:10.1093/oxfordhb/9780190848927.013.24. ISBN 978-0-19-084892-7.

=== Articles ===
- Eyal, Gil; Townsley, Eleanor (1995). "The social composition of the Communist nomenklatura: A comparison of Russia, Poland, and Hungary". Theory and Society. 24 (5): 723–750. doi:10.1007/BF00993404.
- Eyal, Gil; Szelenyi, Ivan; Townsley, Eleanor (April 1997). "The Theory of Post-Communist Managerialism". The New Left Review. 1 (222) 1895: 60–92. doi:10.64590/l8e.
- Townsley, Eleanor; Press, Julie E. (1998). "Wives' and husbands' housework reporting: Gender, class, and social desirability". Gender and Society. 12 (2): 188–218. doi:10.1177/089124398012002005.
- Townsley, Eleanor (2000). "A history of intellectuals and the demise of the new class: Academics and the U.S. government in the 1960s". Theory and Society. 29 (6): 739–784. doi:10.1023/A:1026540309238.
- Townsley, Eleanor (December 2000). "A history of intellectuals and the demise of the new class: Academics and the U.S. government in the 1960s". Theory and Society. 29 (6): 739–784. doi:10.1023/A:1026540309238.
- Eyal, Gil; Szelenyi, Ivan; Townsley, Eleanor (January 2001). "The Utopia of Postsocialist Theory and the Ironic View of History in Neoclassical Sociology". American Journal of Sociology. 106 (4): 1121–1128. doi:10.1086/320300.
- Eyal, Gil; Szelenyi, Ivan; Townsley, Eleanor (July 2001). "Making Capitalism without Capitalists: The New Ruling Elites in Eastern Europe". Contemporary Sociology: A Journal of Reviews. 30 (4): 365. doi:10.2307/3089760. JSTOR 3089760.
- Townsley, Eleanor (2001). "'The Sixties' Trope". Theory, Culture and Society. 18 (6): 99–123. doi:10.1177/02632760122052066.
- Townsley, Eleanor; Wojciech Sokolowski, S. (September 2002). "Civil Society and the Professions in Eastern Europe: Social Change and Organizational Innovation in Poland". Contemporary Sociology: A Journal of Reviews. 31 (5): 553. doi:10.2307/3090043. JSTOR 3090043.
- Eyal, Gil; Szelenyi, Ivan; Townsley, Eleanor (1 March 2003). "Ironie als methode ansätze und fragestellungen einer neoklassischen soziologie". Berliner Journal für Soziologie. 13: 5–34. doi:10.1007/BF03204081 – via Springer Nature.
- Eyal, Gil; Szélényi, Iván; Townsley, Eleanor (2003). "On Irony: An Invitation to Neoclassical Sociology". Thesis Eleven. 73 (1): 5–41. doi:10.1177/0725513603073001002.
- Townsley, Eleanor (September 2006). "The Public Intellectual Trope in the United States". The American Sociologist. 37 (3): 39–66. doi:10.1007/s12108-006-1022-8.
- Townsley, Eleanor (July 2007). "The Social Construction of Social Facts: Using the U.S. Census to Examine Race as a Scientific and Moral Category". Teaching Sociology. 35 (3): 223–238. doi:10.1177/0092055X0703500302.
- Jacobs, Ronald N.; Townsley, Eleanor (September 2008). "On the Communicative Geography of Global Sociology". Canadian Journal of Sociology / Cahiers canadiens de sociologie. 33 (3). doi:10.29173/cjs4152.
- Townsley, Eleanor (November 2010). "The Sociology of Intellectual Life: The Career of the Mind in and Around Academy by Steve Fuller". Contemporary Sociology: A Journal of Reviews. 39 (6): 703–704. doi:10.1177/0094306110386886q. JSTOR 25762863.
- Mclaughlin, Neil; Townsley, Eleanor (November 2011). "Contexts of Cultural Diffusion: A Case Study of "Public Intellectual" Debates in English Canada: Contexts of Cultural Diffusion". Canadian Review of Sociology/Revue canadienne de sociologie. 48 (4): 341–368. doi:10.1111/j.1755-618X.2011.01268.x.
- Townsley, Eleanor (March 2014). "Science, Expertise and Profession in the Post–Normal Discipline". The American Sociologist. 46 (1): 18–28. doi:10.1007/s12108-014-9246-5 – via Sage Journals.
- Jacobs, Ronald N.; Townsley, Eleanor (April 2014). "The Hermeneutics of Hannity: Format Innovation in the Space of Opinion after September 11". Cultural Sociology. 8 (3): 240–257. doi:10.1177/1749975514523938 – via Sage Journals.
- Jacobs, Ronald N.; Townsley, Eleanor (2017-11-20), "Media meta-commentary and the performance of expertise", European Journal of Social Theory, 21 (3): 340–356, doi:10.1177/1368431017740720 – via Sage Journals
