= Nickle =

Nickle may refer to:

== People ==
- Carl Nickle (1914–1990), Canadian editor and publisher, oil baron and politician
- Don Nickles (born 1948), American politician, former Senator from Oklahoma
- Doug Nickle (born 1974), Major League Baseball relief pitcher
- Robert Nickle (1919–1980), American artist
- Robert Nickle (British Army officer) (1786–1855), major general, a commander of the forces in Australia
- Sonny Nickle (born 1969), English rugby league footballer
- William Folger Nickle (1869–1957), Canadian politician, father of William McAdam Nickle
- William McAdam Nickle (1897–1968), Canadian politician

== Fictional characters ==
- Lucas Nickle, protagonist of the children's book The Ant Bully and film The Ant Bully

== Other uses ==
- Nickle (programming language), a numeric-oriented programming language
- European green woodpecker, sometimes called a nickle
- Nickle Arts Museum, also known as The Nickle; see List of museums in Alberta, Canada

== See also ==
- Nickle Resolution, a controversial resolution in 1917 regarding the use of titles in Canada
- Nickel (disambiguation)
- Nickless (surname)
