= Richard Nichols =

Richard Nichols may refer to:

- Dick Nichols (1926–2019), American banker and politician
- Richard Nichols (solicitor) (1938–2016), English solicitor and Lord Mayor of London
- Richard A. Nichols, British geneticist

== See also ==
- Richard Nichols House, historic building in Reading, Massachusetts
- Richard Nicholls (1875–1948), English cricketer
