= John Nicoll =

John Nicoll may refer to:

- John Nicoll (chronicler) (c.1590–1668), Scottish chronicler
- John Cochran Nicoll (1793–1863), United States federal judge
- John Allardyce Nicoll (1894–1976), British literary scholar and teacher
- John Fearns Nicoll (1899-1981), British colonial governor
- John Nicoll (MP), for Bodmin (UK Parliament constituency) 1402, 1425 and 1426

== See also ==
- Johnny Nicol, jazz singer
- John Nichol (disambiguation)
