= Jonathan Nichols =

Jonathan Nichols may refer to:

- Jonathan Nichols (Rhode Island politician) (1681–1727), colonial deputy governor of Rhode Island
- Jonathan Nichols (American football) (born 1981), former placekicker
- Jonathan Nichols (Oklahoma politician) (1965–2019), Republican United States politician from the U.S. state of Oklahoma
- Jonathan Nichols Jr. (1712–1756), deputy governor of the Colony of Rhode Island and Providence Plantations
- Jon Nichols (born 1981), English footballer
