= Ferrin Campbell =

American politician (1923–2012)

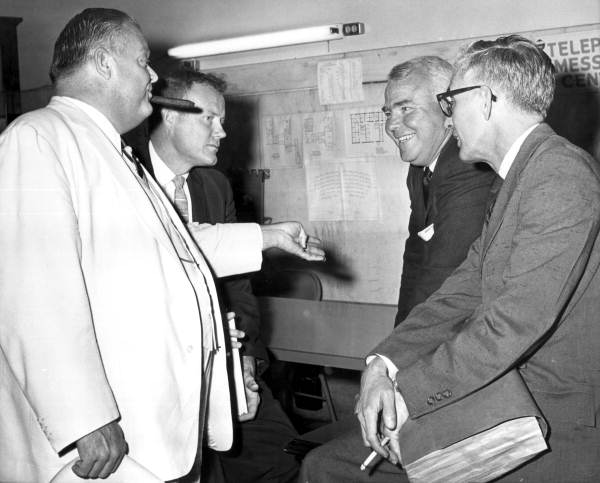
- Campbell (second from left) with L. K. Edwards Jr., Elmer Otto Friday and William G. O'Neill in 1963

Member of the Florida House of Representatives from Okaloosa County
- In office 1951–1955
- Preceded by: James H. Wise
- Succeeded by: Charles D. Stewart

Member of the Florida Senate from the 39th district
- In office 1963–1965
- Succeeded by: Maurice McLaughlin

Personal details
- Born: Ferrin Colin Campbell; September 1, 1923
- Died: May 12, 2012 (aged 88) Crestview, Florida, U.S.
- Party: Democratic
- Spouse: Edwina Gaskin
- Education: Auburn University; University of Florida Levin College of Law

Ferrin Colin Campbell (September 1, 1923 – May 12, 2012) was an American politician. He served as a Democratic member of the Florida House of Representatives He also served as a member of the Florida Senate, representing the 39th district.

== Life and career ==
Campbell was the son of Marie and Ernest Willie Campbell. He attended Laurel Hill School, where he graduated in 1941. After graduating, Campbell trained as a pilot before joining the United States Marine Corps in 1944. He served during World War II and was honorably discharged as a first lieutenant in 1946.

Campbell attended Auburn University, graduating in 1948. He later moved to Florida, where he attended the University of Florida Levin College of Law, graduating in 1950.

Campbell was named the sheriff of Okaloosa County, Florida, by Governor Fuller Warren. At the age of 26 he was the youngest sheriff in the state.

In 1951, Campbell was elected to the Florida House of Representatives. He succeeded James H. Wise. In 1955, Campbell was succeeded by Charles D. Stewart. Eight years later, he was elected to represent the 39th district of the Florida Senate. Campbell was succeeded by Maurice McLaughlin in 1965.

Campbell died in May 2012 in Crestview, Florida, at the age of 88.
