= Trish Weedn =

American politician

Patricia "Trish" Weedn
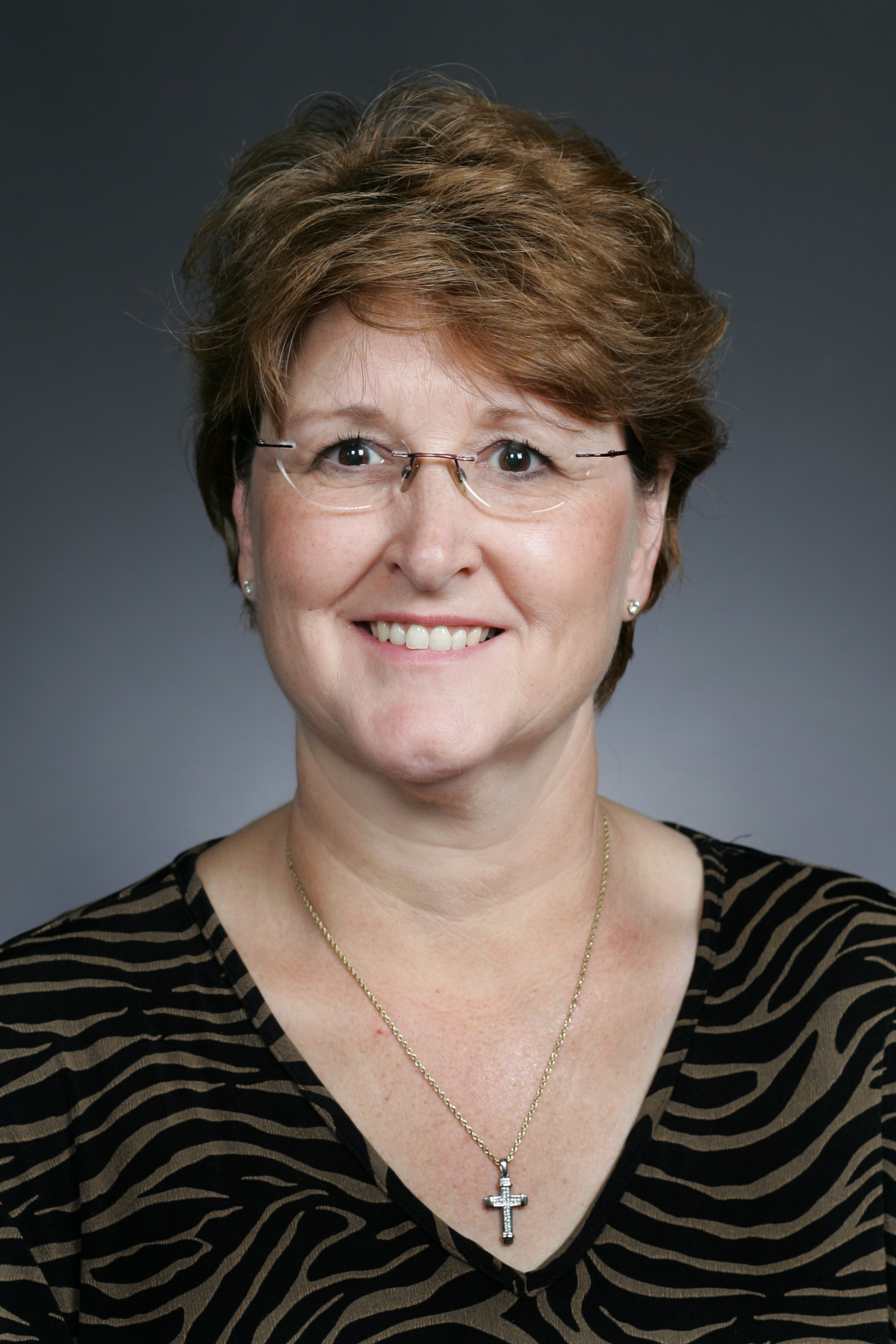

Member of the Oklahoma Senate from the 15th district
- In office 1989–2000
- Preceded by: Bill Branch
- Succeeded by: Jonathan Nichols

Personal details
- Born: Patricia Throckmorton; May 10, 1950 (age 76) Oklahoma City, Oklahoma, U.S.
- Party: Democratic
- Spouse: James Weedn
- Education: University of Oklahoma
- Profession: McClain County Assessor 1978-1988

Patricia Weedn (née Throckmorton; born May 10, 1950) is an American politician from the U.S. state of Oklahoma. Elected in 1989, Weedn served in the Oklahoma Senate, representing District 15, until 2000. Prior to her public office, Weedn worked as the McClain County Assessor for ten years. She was the first woman to be elected Senator in Cleveland and McClain counties. Weedn remains active in her community outside of the legislature and has two children.

== Early life ==
Born in Oklahoma City on May 10, 1950, Weedn was one of seven children born to parents Carl and Ted Throckmorton. Along with selling vegetables and other goods on the side of the highway, Weedn's parents started a family-owned restaurant and truck stop from 1961 on that ran 24 hours a day. All seven of the children worked the restaurant and Weedn learned to cook large meals at a very young age because of her experience with the family business. Weedn became interested in politics due to her father's interest and involvement in the political sphere.

=== Education ===
When Weedn's youngest daughter graduated from high school in 1993, she began her college education that fall. Weedn got her degree in Public Administration from the University of Oklahoma in four and a half years while she was in the state Senate.

== Career ==
Weedn went to work for the McClain County Courthouse at the age of 21 as the deputy treasurer. She served in this role for approximately seven years. At the age of 27, Weedn ran for her first public office position and was elected in 1978 as McClain County Assessor. During the middle of her third term as the County Assessor, in 1988, Weedn felt that it was the appropriate time to run for the Oklahoma Senate, a dream she had been waiting to make a reality. Weedn worked as her own campaign manager and spent $752 in two races as opposed to her opponent who spent nearly $14,000. Her pastor developed a slogan for her first campaign that read, " I'd rather be Lead'n with Weedn than out on a limb with Branch."

== Oklahoma Senate ==
Elected in 1989, Weedn represented the 15th District in the Oklahoma Senate until 2000. Weedn remained extremely busy while in office, attending every function or speaking event that she was invited to in her district. The first controversial bill that Weedn voted on was House Bill 1750. This bill increased taxes to fund education and barely passed. While in office, Weedn authored a bill that stopped partial birth abortion. Within the Democratic Party (United States) she received a lot of backlash for her role with this controversial law. In 1995, Weedn lead an economic incentive bill that was beneficial to the Wal-Mart distribution center which in turn created jobs for around 600 workers in Pauls Valley, OK.

Weedn decided not to run for her last term because her husband was diagnosed with cancer and she could not see herself campaigning under those circumstances. She returned all of the campaign donations she had raised up until that point and retired after a 32-year career as a state and county employee. Since retiring, Weedn works as a full-time employee as the executive director for the Council of Governments.

=== Senate Committees ===
- General Government Committee
- Department of Human Services Sub-Committee
- Appropriations Committee

Outside of public office, Weedn spends her time with several organizations, including:

- 14 Chamber of Commerce
- Pentecostal Holiness Church of Christian Ministries, Board Member
- Kiwanis
- Oklahoma Federation of Democratic Women
- McClain County Democratic Party
- Sooner Girl Scout Council, President
