= Justice Nichols =

Justice Nichols or Nicholls may refer to"

- David A. Nichols (1917–1997), associate justice of the Maine Supreme Judicial Court
- Francis T. Nicholls (1834–1912), chief justice of the Louisiana Supreme Court
- Horace Elmo Nichols (1912–2000), chief justice of the Supreme Court of Georgia
- Hugh L. Nichols (1865–1942), chief justice of the Ohio Supreme Court
