= Jack Nichols =

Jack Nichols is the name of:

- Jack Nichols (painter) (1921–2009), Canadian painter
- Jack Nichols (activist) (1938–2005), American LGBT activist
- Jack Nichols (basketball) (1926–1992), American basketball player
- Jack C. Nichols (1930–2007), American politician

== See also ==
- John Nichols (disambiguation)
- Jack Nicholls (born 1943), British bishop
