= Mark Nichols =

Mark Nichols may refer to:

- Mark Nichols (curler) (born 1980), Canadian curler
- Mark Nichols (linebacker) (born 1956), American football player
- Mark Nichols (American football) (born 1959), American football player
- Mark Nichols (golfer) (born 1965), English golfer
- Mark Nichols (composer) (born 1964), American playwright, composer and lyricist
- Mark Nichols (journalist) (1873–1961), Canadian newspaper journalist and editor

== See also ==
- Mark Nicholls (disambiguation)
