= William Nicholls =

William or Bill Nicholls may refer to:

- William Nicholls (theologian) (1664−1712), English clergyman and theologian
- Sir William Nicholls (Royal Marines officer) (1854−1935), British Royal Marines general
- William Henry Nicholls, Australian amateur botanist
- Billy Nicholls (born 1949), British singer, songwriter, composer, record producer, and musical director
- Bill Nicholls (Australian footballer) (born 1981), Australian rules footballer
- Bill Nicholls (Vanuatuan footballer) (born 1993), Vanuatuan footballer
- Will Nicholls (born 1995), British photographer and film-maker

== See also ==
- William Nichols (disambiguation)
