= David Nichols =

David Nichols may refer to:

- David A. Nichols (1917–1997), judge of the Maine Supreme Judicial Court
- David C. Nichols (born 1950), U.S. naval officer
- David E. Nichols (born 1944), American pharmacologist and medicinal chemist
- David Eccles Nichols (1873–1962), violist
- David H. Nichols (1826–1900), Colorado Lieutenant Governor

== See also ==
- Dave Nichol (1940–2013), Canadian product marketing expert
- David Nicholls (disambiguation)
- David Nicholl (disambiguation)
- David Nicolle (born 1944), British historian
