= Mark Nicholls =

Mark Nicholls may refer to:

- Mark Nicholls (footballer), English footballer
- Mark Nicholls (rugby league), Australian rugby league player
- Mark Nicholls (rugby union), New Zealand rugby union player and selector

== See also ==
- Mark Nichols (disambiguation)
