= Winnipeg Telegram =

Former newspaper in Manitoba

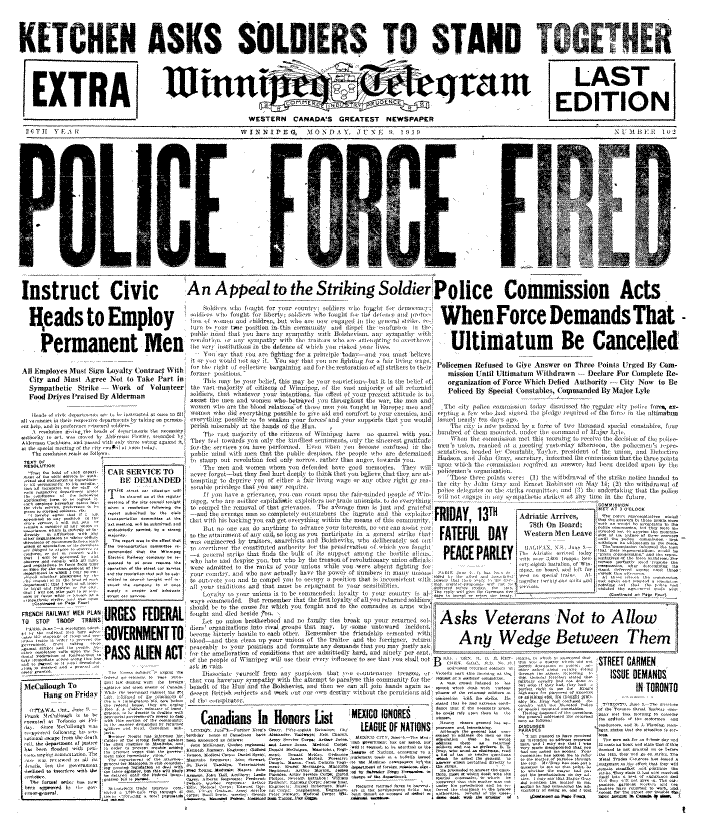
- Winnipeg Telegram Front Cover June 9, 1919
- Type: Daily newspaper
- Owner: William Sanford Evans
- Founded: June 9, 1898
- Headquarters: 70 Albert Street; Winnipeg, Manitoba, Canada
- Website: Winnipeg Telegram Strike Editions

The Winnipeg Telegram was a daily newspaper in Winnipeg, Manitoba which was published from June 9, 1898, to October 16, 1920.

The paper originated as the Daily Nor'Wester, which was founded in 1894 by William Luxton who also founded the Winnipeg Free Press. Luxton sold the paper in 1896. From January 2, 1897, to June 8, 1898, a morning and evening edition were published. On June 9, the paper was renamed the Morning Telegram and was published every day except Sunday until August 21, 1907. It was subsequently renamed the Winnipeg Telegram.

Editors of the newspaper included:

- William Sanford Evans (1901–1905)
- Mark Nichols
- Garnet Porter

Evans purchased the newspaper in 1901 and continued as owner until 1920.

The Telegram was closely associated with the provincial Conservative party. During the Winnipeg general strike in 1919, the paper published special "strike editions" which characterized the leaders of the strike as "Bolshevik revolutionaries".

James H. Richardson, the legendary city editor of the old Los Angeles Examiner, got his start at The Telegram upon dropping out of Kelvin High School in 1912. In his memoir, "For the Life of Me," he devotes a chapter to his time at The Telegram. As city editor, Richardson oversaw coverage of the infamous Black Dahlia murder for the Hearst-owned Examiner.

The Telegram merged with the rival Winnipeg Tribune in 1920.

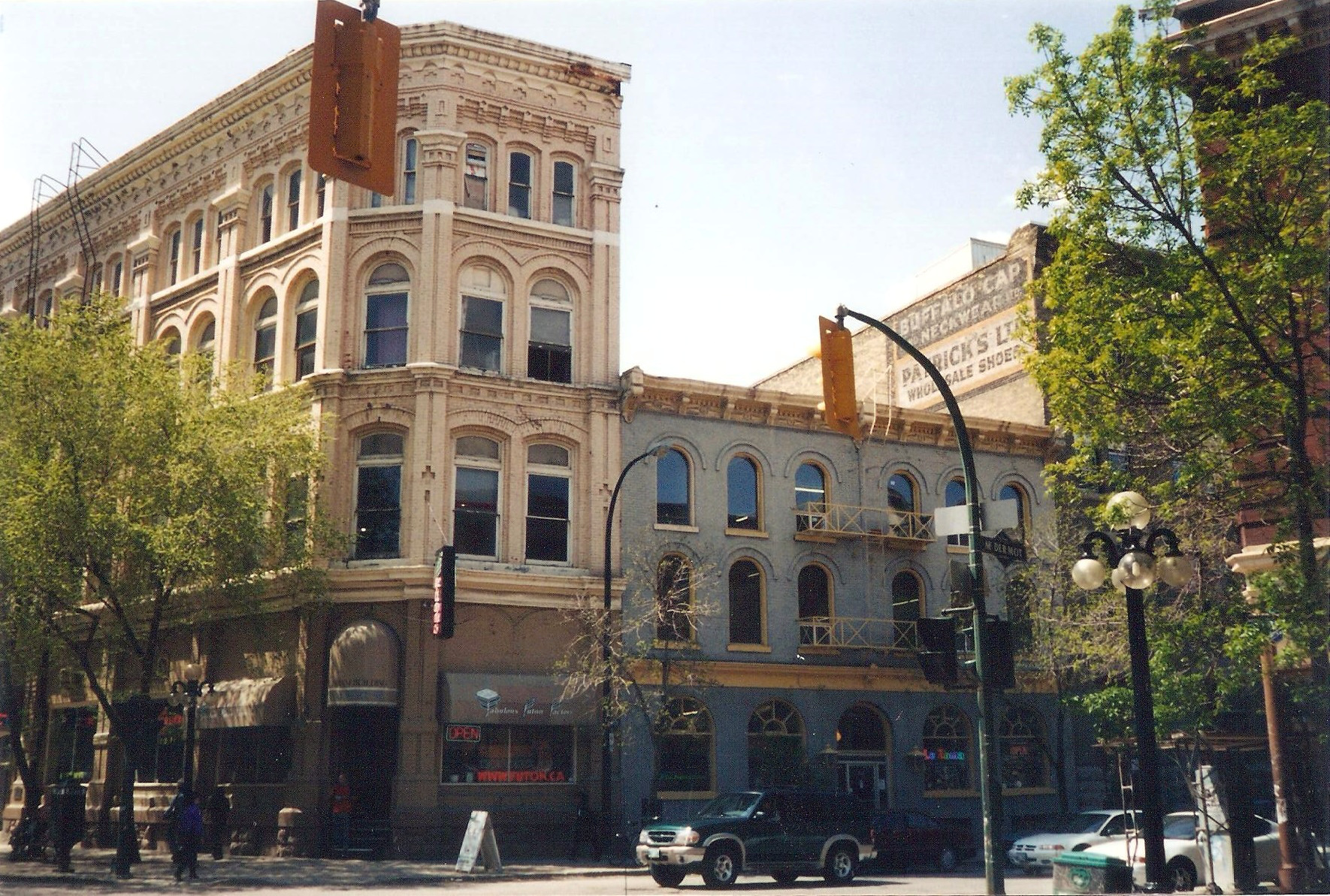
Albert Street and McDermot Avenue (19812331799)

The Telegram Building in Winnipeg, where the Telegram was based from 1899 to 1920, has been designated as a historic building by the city of Winnipeg.
