= Thomas Nicholls =

Thomas or Tom Nicholls may refer to:

- Thomas Nicholls (sculptor) (c. 1825–1896), English sculptor
- Thomas Nicholls (boxer) (1931–2021), British boxer
- Tom Nicholls (born 1992), Australian rules footballer
- Thomas David Nicholls (1870–1931), US Representative from Pennsylvania
- Tom Nicholls (rower) (born 1983), Australian rower

== See also ==
- Tom Nichols (disambiguation)
- Tom Nickalls (1828–1899), English stockjobber
