= Jesper Møller (animator) =

Danish animator

Jesper Moller (Danish: Møller) is a Danish animator, screenwriter and movie-director.

== Career ==
After initially working as character animator at Sullivan Bluth Studios under the direction of Don Bluth, he joined Danish animation studio A. Film A/S in Copenhagen, Denmark.

After a period as the creative head of Feature Animation, also acting as sequence director on several films, he went on to co-direct (with Stefan Fjeldmark) the 2006 film Asterix and the Vikings, based on René Goscinny and Albert Uderzo's comic book.

In March 2008, Jesper Møller founded Copenhagen-based independent movie company Parka Pictures ApS. In January 2012, veteran German animation producer Lilian Klages joined Parka Pictures as CEO and Executive Producer.

== Awards and nominations ==
In 2011, Jesper Møller was nominated "Director of the Year" at the Cartoon Movie 2011 in Lyon – France, for Sandman and the Lost Sand of Dreams.

== Filmography ==
- 1988–1990: Animator on All Dogs Go to Heaven, Rock-a-Doodle and A Troll in Central Park.
- 1991: Animator on FernGully: The Last Rainforest.
- 1992: Animator on Once Upon a Forest.
- 1993: Animator on Thumbelina.
- 1993: Animator on Asterix Conquers America.

Supervising animator on Jungledyret Hugo.

- 1994: Animator on Felidae.
- 1994–1995: Storyboard/Development/Directing animator on All Dogs Go to Heaven 2.

Directing animator on Jungledyret Hugo 2.

- 1996–1997: Sequence Director on Quest for Camelot.
- 1998–1999: Storyboard/Development/Directing animator on Help! I'm a Fish.
- 2000: Storyboard/Development on Troll Story.
- 2001: Sequence Director on Eight Crazy Nights.

Storyboard on Tarzan II.

- 2002–2006: Director and Character Designer on Asterix and the Vikings.
- 2006-: Director on Mikisoq.
- 2006–2009: Director on Friends Forever.
- 2008–2009: Director on The Sandman and the Lost Sand of Dreams.
- 2009: Screenplay on Mikisoq.
- 2009–2011: Screenplay on Marnie's World.
- 2010–2011: Director on Prototyp (Pilot).

(In development)

- 2011: Screenplay on Harvie and the Magic Museum.
- 2010s: Character designer on Asterix: The Mansions of the Gods

Writer/Producer on Latte and the Magic Waterstone
