= Maurice McLaughlin =

American politician

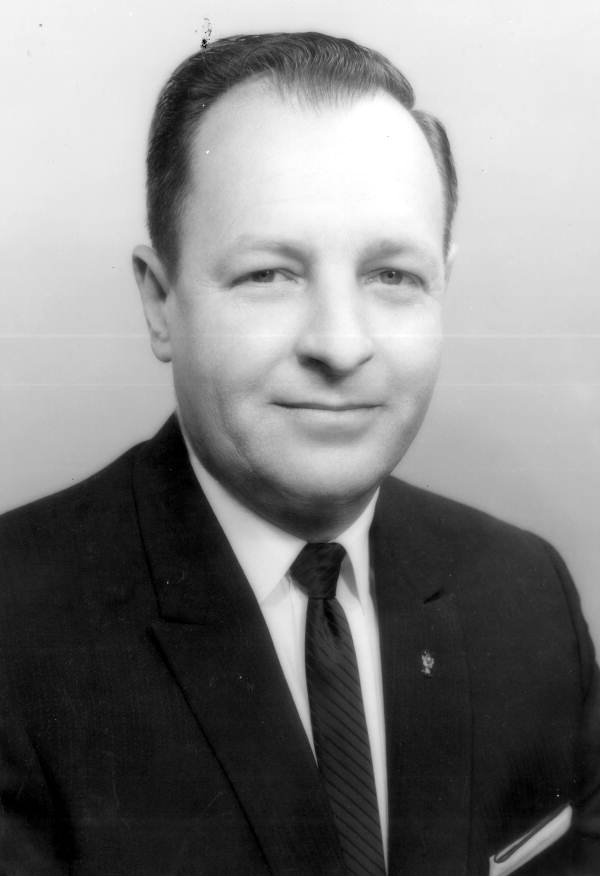
- McLaughlin in 1963

Member of the Florida House of Representatives from Okaloosa County
- In office 1962–1965 Serving with James H. Wise
- Preceded by: Jack C. Nichols
- Succeeded by: James H. Wise

Member of the Florida Senate from the 39th district
- In office 1965–1966
- Preceded by: Ferrin Campbell

Personal details
- Born: 1924
- Died: June 27, 2000 (aged 75–76) Pensacola, Florida, U.S.
- Party: Democratic
- Spouse: Tena McLaughlin

Maurice McLaughlin (1924 – June 27, 2000) was an American politician. He served as a Democratic member of the Florida House of Representatives. McLaughlin also served as a member for the 39th district of the Florida Senate.

McLaughlin worked as a funeral director. He was mayor of Fort Walton Beach, Florida and a member of the Walton Beach City Council for two years. In 1962, he was elected to the Florida House of Representatives. McLaughlin succeeded politician, Jack C. Nichols. In 1965 McLaughlin left office to serve for the 39th district of the Florida Senate. He served until 1966.

McLaughlin died in June 2000 of heart failure at a hospital in Pensacola, Florida, at the age of 76.
