= John Nicholls =

John or Jack Nicholls may refer to:

- John Nicholls (controversialist) (1555–1584?), Welsh religious controversialist
- John Nicholls (MP) (c. 1745–1832), British Member of Parliament (MP) for Bletchingley 1783–87 and for Tregony 1796–1802
- John C. Nicholls (1834–1893), United States Representative from Georgia
- Jack Nicholls (footballer) (1898–1970), Welsh international footballer
- John Walter Nicholls (1909–1970), British ambassador
- Jack "Putty Nose" Nicholls (1912–1981), Australian waterfront identity
- John Nicholls (RAF officer) (1926–2007), British air marshal
- John Graham Nicholls (1929–2023), British/American/Swiss physiologist/neuroscientist
- Johnny Nicholls (1931–1995), English footballer
- John Nicholls (footballer) (born 1939), Australian footballer
- John Nicholls (surgeon), British surgeon
- Jack Nicholls (born 1943), British Anglican Bishop of Sheffield
- John Nicholls, British Committee of 100 signatory

== See also ==
- John Nickolls (1710–1745), English merchant
- John Nichols (disambiguation)
- John Nicholl (disambiguation)
