= Herbert Coy Barnhill =

American politician

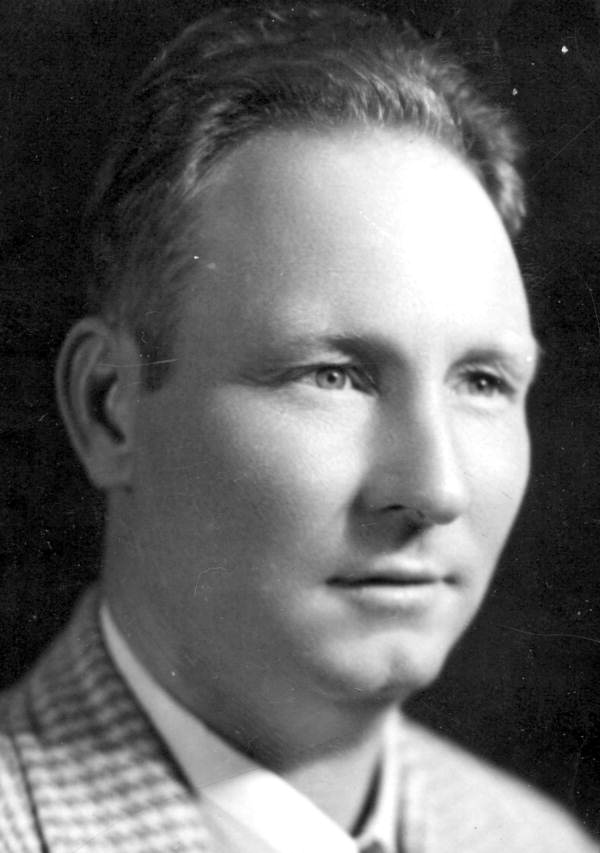
- Barhill in 1945

Member of the Florida House of Representatives from Okaloosa County
- In office 1945–1948
- Succeeded by: James H. Wise

Personal details
- Born: November 2, 1907 Milton, Florida, U.S.
- Died: June 2, 1996 (aged 88)
- Party: Democratic
- Children: 5

Herbert Coy Barnhill (November 2, 1907 – June 2, 1996), also known as Hub Barnhill, was an American politician. He served as a Democratic member of the Florida House of Representatives.

== Life and career ==
Barnhill was born in Milton, Florida. He was a sawmill operator.

Barnhill served in the Florida House of Representatives from 1945 to 1948.

Barnhill died on June 2, 1996, at the age of 88.
