= Lawrence T. Nichols =

American sociologist

Lawrence T. Nichols (born December 21, 1947, in Chicago, Illinois) was a professor of sociology in the Division of Sociology and Anthropology at West Virginia University in Morgantown, West Virginia.

== Education ==
Nichols received an AB (1969) and MA (1973) from Saint Louis University and a Ph.D. from Boston College in 1985.

== Career ==
Nichols is the editor of The American Sociologist, a peer-reviewed journal that examines the history, current status and future prospects of the discipline of sociology. He is credited with establishing criminology concentration at West Virginia University.

With Anthony F. Buono, he proposed the Stockholder–stakeholder model of corporate social responsibility in the seminal work, "Stockholder and Stakeholder Interpretation of Business' Social Role".
