= Thomas Nichols Three Deckers =

- U.S. National Register of Historic Places
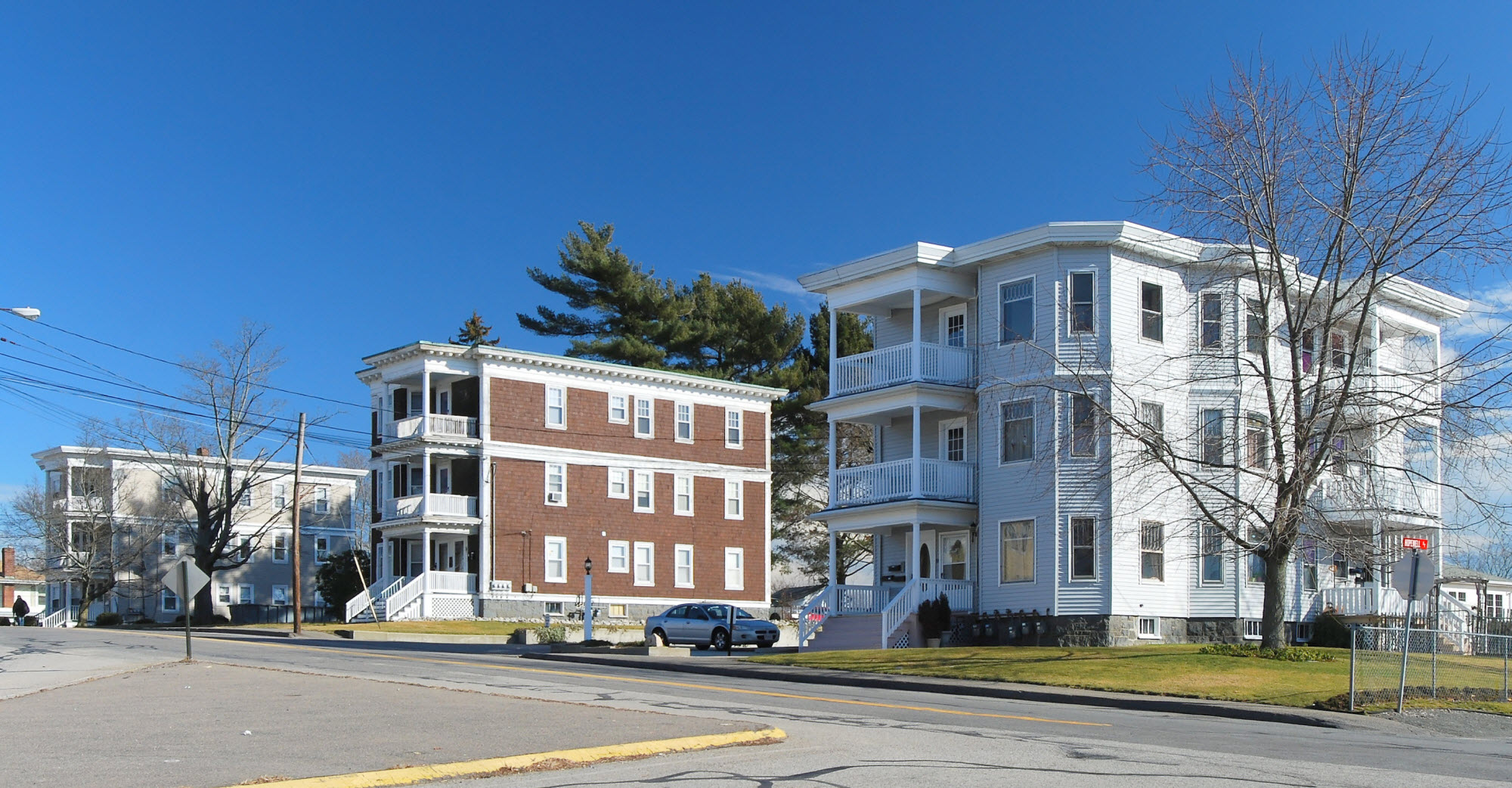
- At left: 68 and 80 West Britannia; At right: 88 West Brittania (non-contributing)

- Location within Massachusetts Location within the United States
- Location: 68, 80, 88 W. Britannia St., Taunton, Massachusetts
- Coordinates: 41°54′48″N 71°6′7″W
- Built: 1914
- Architectural style: Colonial Revival
- MPS: Taunton MRA
- NRHP reference No.: 84002097
- Added to NRHP: July 5, 1984

The Thomas Nichols Three Deckers are three historic three deckers located at 68, 80 and 88 West Britannia Street in Taunton, Massachusetts. The once-identical buildings were built in 1914 by Thomas Nichols, a real estate speculator. Two of the three (numbers 68 and 80) were listed on the National Register of Historic Places in 1984 for their external architecture and rarity of form in the city; #68 has since been compromised by alterations.

== Description and history ==
The Thomas Nichols Three Deckers are located north of downtown Taunton, on the south side of West Britannia Street between Hopewell and Thomas Streets. They are located a short walk from the Reed and Barton Complex, historically one of the city's major industrial employers. All three are fairly typical triple deckers, of wood-frame construction with flat roofs. They were all originally sided with wooden shingles, have corner pilasters, and the roofs had extended eaves studded with modillion blocks. Of the three, only #80 retains all of these features: #68 has been refinished in wooden clapboards and synthetic siding, and the eaves no longer have modillions. #88 has been refinished in aluminum siding and has none of these features. All three have three-story porches on one side of the front, and a projecting polygonal bay on the other. Porches and projecting bays are also found on one side of numbers 80 and 88. The front porches have round columns for support, and have a broad entablature at the top of the third floor.

Although quite common in many industrial New England cities, three deckers were historically an uncommon sight in Taunton. These three were estimated to be built about 1914, based on architectural evidence. They were probably built by Thomas Nichols, a prominent local real estate developer of the period.

== See also ==
- National Register of Historic Places listings in Taunton, Massachusetts
