= Doc Nichols House =

Historic house in Durham, North Carolina

Coordinates: 35°58′33″N 78°47′23″W

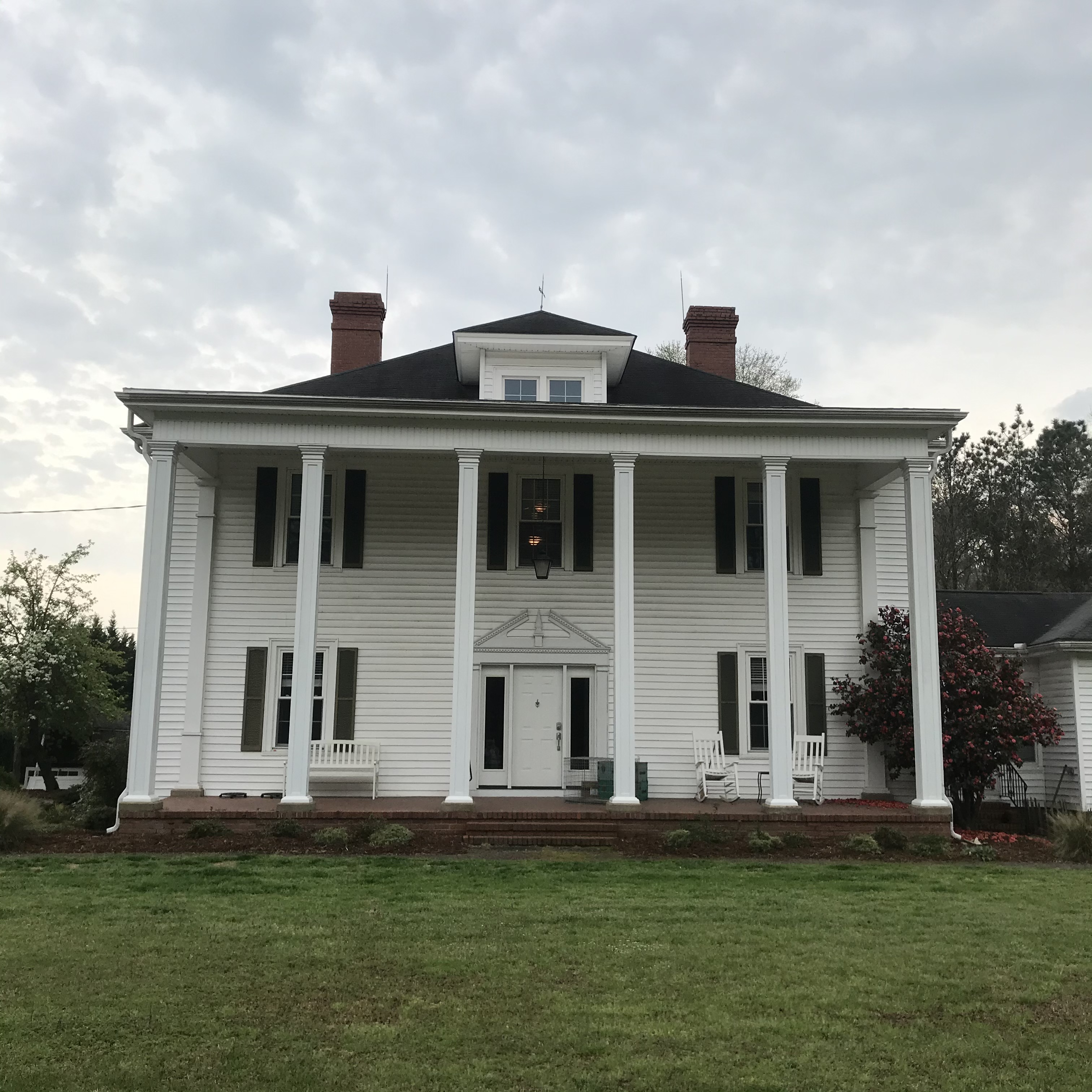
- The house in 2021
- Interactive map of the Doc Nichols House area

General information
- Status: active
- Type: private residence
- Architectural style: Colonial Revival
- Location: Durham, North Carolina, U.S.
- Completed: 1900

The Doc Nichols House is an early 20th-century Colonial Revival mansion in eastern Durham, North Carolina off of North Carolina Highway 98.

== History ==
The Doc Nichols House was built in eastern Durham at the turn of the century for Dr. Nichols, a local physician. The house, built in the Colonial Revival style, was completed in 1900. The original construction of the house consisted of a massive main block with a rectangular plan and an adjacent rear ell with a small doctor's office. The house has two corbelled brick chimneys on either side.

The Nichols family sold the house to the Glover family in the 1940s, after which decorative features including the front porch and roof balustrade were added. Anne Eakes purchased the house in 1985 and opened the Sandpiper Antique Store inside the home.
