= Nichols House (Newton, Massachusetts) =

Historic house in Massachusetts, United States

- U.S. National Register of Historic Places
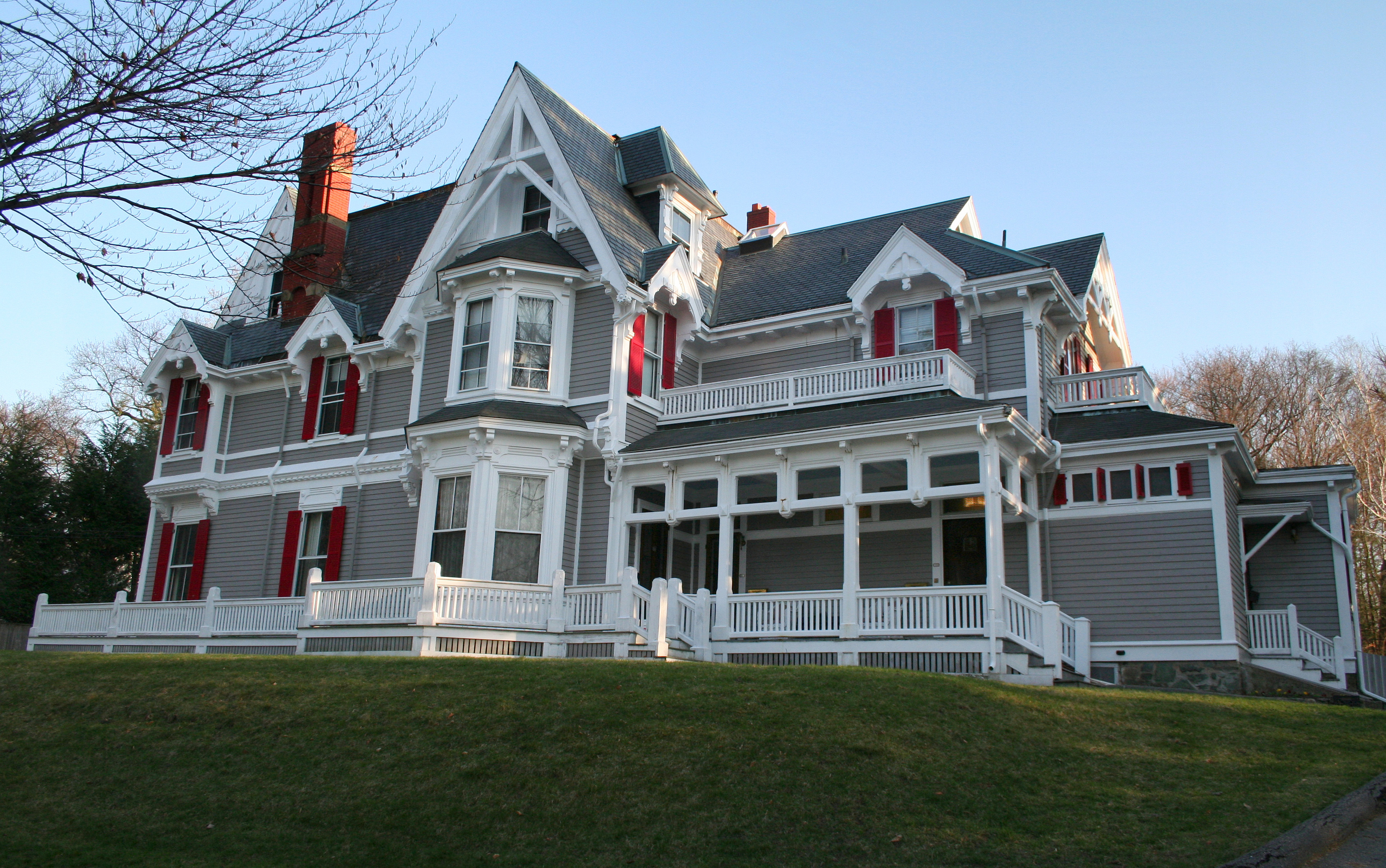

- Location within Massachusetts Location within the United States
- Location: 140 Sargent Street, Newton, Massachusetts
- Coordinates: 42°20′46″N 71°11′13″W
- Built: 1879
- Architectural style: Stick/Eastlake
- MPS: Newton MRA
- NRHP reference No.: 86001857
- Added to NRHP: September 4, 1986

The Nichols House is a historic house in Newton, Massachusetts. Built in 1897, this 2 1/2-story wood-frame house is one of the city's finest examples of Stick style architecture. It features numerous steeply pitched gables typical of the style, some of which are elaborately decorated with applied wood trim. The main entry is sheltered within a decorated porte cochere. J. Howard Nichols, the owner, was a wealthy merchant in the China trade.

The house was listed on the National Register of Historic Places in 1986.

== See also ==
- National Register of Historic Places listings in Newton, Massachusetts
