= John F. Nichols House =

Historic house in Massachusetts, United States

- U.S. National Register of Historic Places
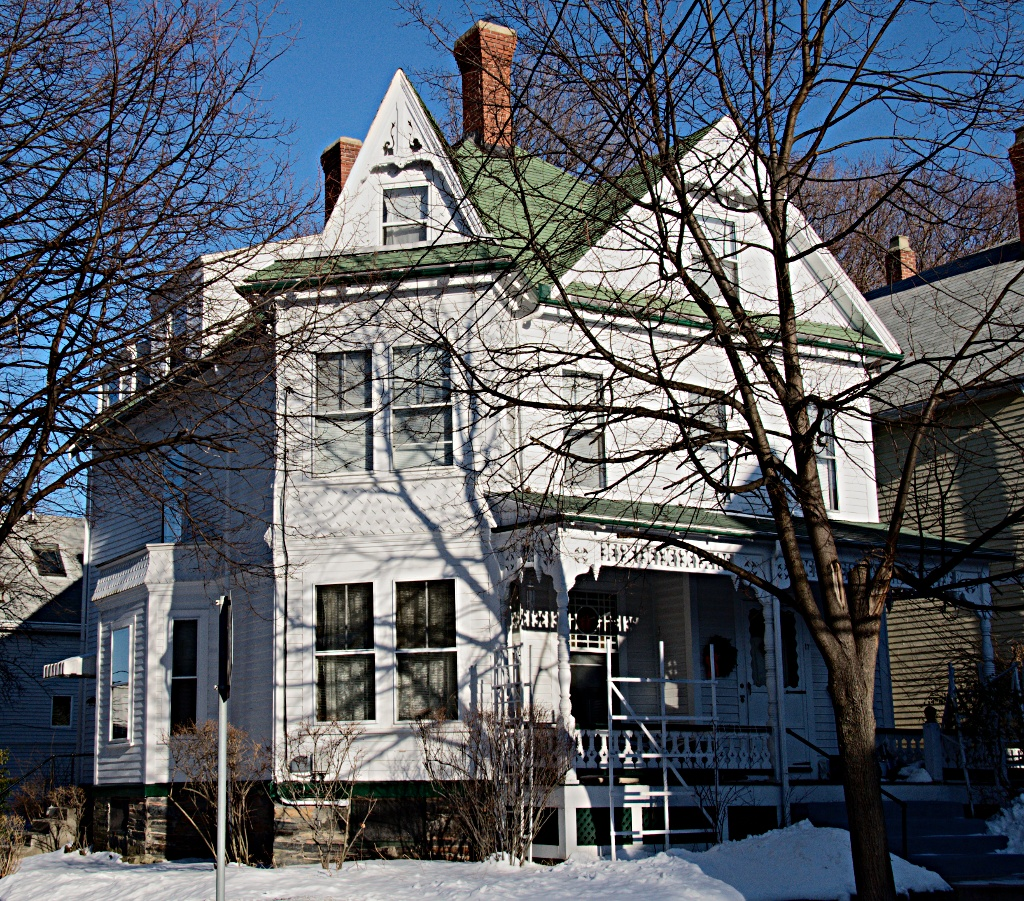
- The house in winter

- Location within Massachusetts Location within the United States
- Location: 17 Summit Street, Somerville, Massachusetts
- Coordinates: 42°23′59.6622″N 71°7′10.7739″W
- Built: 1890
- Architectural style: Queen Anne
- MPS: Somerville MPS
- NRHP reference No.: 89001285
- Added to NRHP: September 18, 1989

The John F. Nichols House is a historic house in Somerville, Massachusetts. The 2.5-story wood-frame house was built c. 1890, and is a well-preserved Queen Anne Victorian. The house has a prominent corner bay which is topped by a steeply pitched gable roof. There is also a front gable dormer and side shed dormers on what is otherwise a hipped roof. The gable ends are decorated with jigsaw woodwork, as is the front porch.

The house was listed on the National Register of Historic Places in 1989.

== See also ==
- National Register of Historic Places listings in Somerville, Massachusetts
