= Nicholls =

Nicholls may refer to:

- Nicholls (surname), an English surname
- Nicholls State University (f. 1948), a Louisiana university named for Francis T. Nicholls
- Nicholls Colonels, the athletic program of said university
- Division of Nicholls, an electoral division in Victoria, Australia

== Places ==
- Nicholls, Australian Capital Territory, Australia
- Nicholls, Georgia, United States
