= James Nichols House =

Historic house in Massachusetts, United States

- U.S. National Register of Historic Places
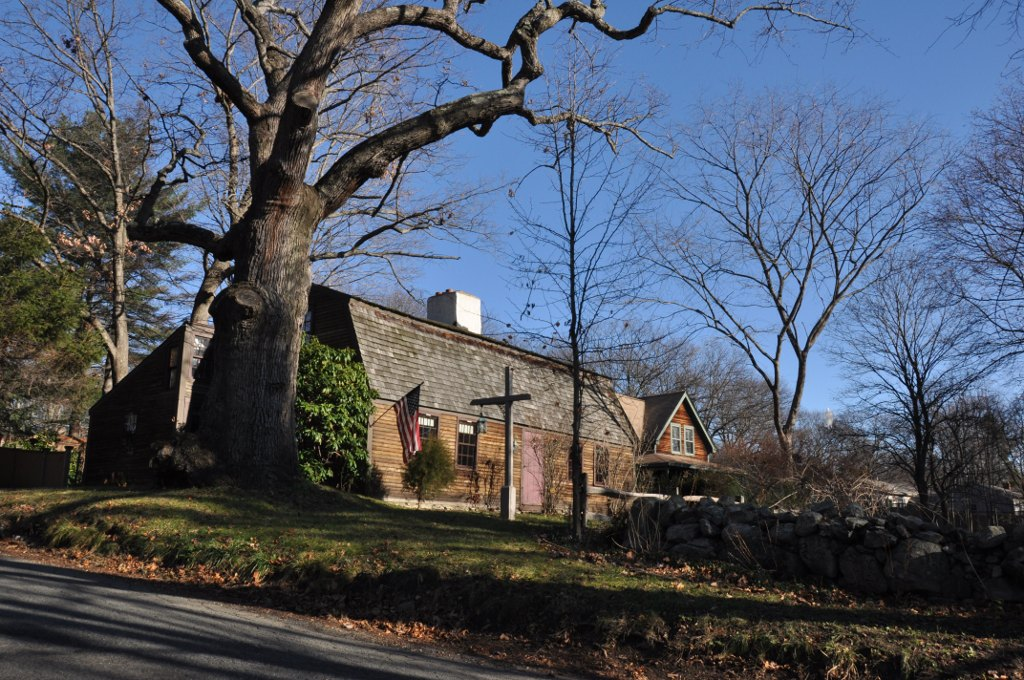

- Location within Massachusetts Location within the United States
- Location: 273 Pearl Street, Reading, Massachusetts
- Coordinates: 42°32′21″N 71°6′2″W
- Built: 1795
- Architectural style: Queen Anne, Georgian
- MPS: Reading MRA
- NRHP reference No.: 84002755
- Added to NRHP: July 19, 1984

The James Nichols House is a historic house in Reading, Massachusetts. Built c. 1795, this 1 1/2-story gambrel-roofed house is built in a vernacular Georgian style, and is a rare local example of the style. The house was built by a local shoemaker and farmer who was involved in a religious dispute that divided the town. The house was listed on the National Register of Historic Places in 1984.

== Description and history ==
The Nichols House is set on the east side of Pearl Street at its junction with Wakefield Street, in what is now a rural-suburban area of northern Reading, opposite Forest Glen Cemetery. Facing south, the 1 1/2-story wood-frame structure is five bays wide, with a large central chimney and a gambrel roof that slopes toward the back in a saltbox configuration. A "Beverly dodge" projection extends from the back half of the west side, with a shed-roof sloping to the rear. Decorative elements are minimal, with a simple door treatment and sash windows that extend up to the cornice. There is a late 19th-century Queen Anne style carriage house on the property east of the house.

When this house was built c. 1795, Pearl Street was a major north–south route running from Reading to Andover. It was built by James Nichols, who engaged in the locally significant business of shoe making, an activity he would have performed on this property, selling his product to a merchant in the town center. Nichols is known to have been at the center of a religious controversy whose details are poorly documented. He is known to have been excommunicated from the South Parish Church, and to have later joined the North Parish in what is now North Reading.

== See also ==
- National Register of Historic Places listings in Reading, Massachusetts
- National Register of Historic Places listings in Middlesex County, Massachusetts
