= Charles D. Stewart =

American politician

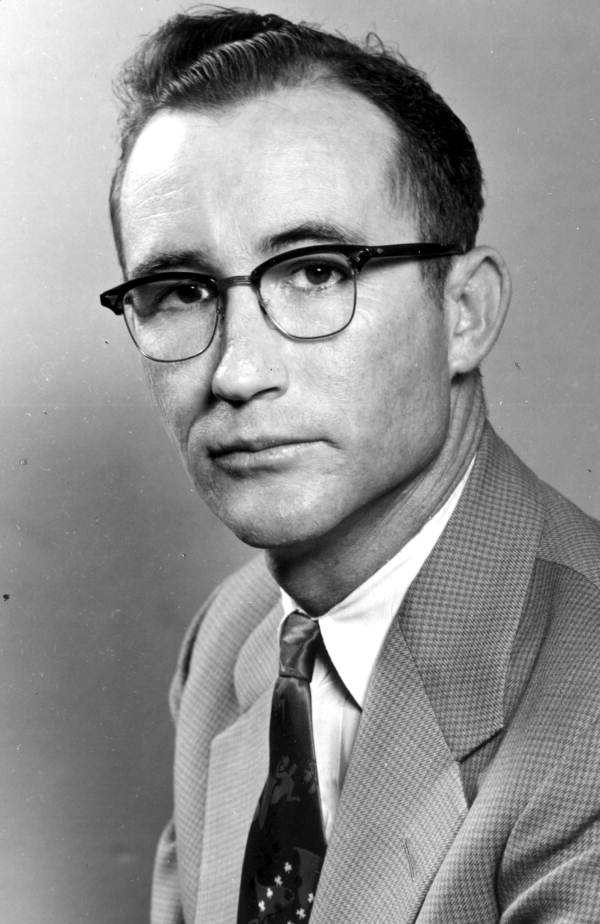
- Stewart in 1955

Member of the Florida House of Representatives from Okaloosa County
- In office 1955–1961
- Preceded by: Ferrin Campbell
- Succeeded by: Jack C. Nichols

Personal details
- Born: February 17, 1919
- Died: August 15, 1986 (aged 67)
- Party: Democratic

Charles D. Stewart (February 17, 1919 – August 15, 1986) was an American politician. He served as a Democratic member of the Florida House of Representatives.

In 1955, Stewart was elected to the Florida House of Representatives, succeeding Ferrin Campbell. In 1961, he was succeeded by Jack C. Nichols.
