= David Nicholl =

David Nicholl or Nicoll may refer to:

- David Nicholl (neurologist) (fl. 2000s–2010s), Irish neurologist
- David Nicholl (rugby union) (1871–1918), Welsh international rugby union player
- David Nicoll (anarchist) (1859–1919), British anarchist
- David Nicoll (footballer) (fl. 1890s–1900s), Scottish footballer
- Dave Nicoll (1944–2023), English motocross racer
- Dave Nicol (musician) (fl. 1970s–1990s), Canadian folk singer

== See also ==
- David Nicholls (disambiguation)
- David Nichol (disambiguation)
- David Nichols (disambiguation)
- David Nicolle (born 1944), British historian
