= William Nichols =

William or Bill Nichols may refer to:

- William Nichols (English priest), Dean of Chester, 1644–1657
- William Nichols, secretary of John Fell, 17th century clergyman
- William Nichols (mariner) (fl. 1758–1780), English sea captain
- William Nichols (architect) (1780–1853), English-born American architect
- William T. Nichols (1829–1882), American politician, soldier, and businessman
- William Nichols (Medal of Honor) (c. 1837–?), American Civil War sailor and Medal of Honor recipient
- William Ripley Nichols (1847–1886), American chemist and leading authority on water purification
- William Ford Nichols (1849–1924), Bishop of California in the Episcopal Church
- William Francis Nichols (1852–1917), American businessman and politician
- William H. Nichols (1852–1930), American chemist and businessman
- William Nichols, founder of Nichols School, Buffalo, New York, in 1892
- Bill Nichols (politician) (1918–1988), United States Representative from Alabama
- Billy Nichols (1940–2025), American musician
- Bill Nichols (film critic) (born 1942), American historian and film theorist
- William Nichols (artist) (born 1942), American artist

== See also ==
- William Nicholls (disambiguation)
- William Nicholson (disambiguation)
