= David Nicholls (footballer, born 1956) =

English footballer

Personal information
- Date of birth: 3 November 1956 (age 69)
- Place of birth: Bradford, England
- Position: Midfielder

Youth career
- Huddersfield Town

Senior career*
Years	Team	Apps	(Gls)
1973–1975	Huddersfield Town	0	(0)
1975–1976	Bradford City	4	(0)
- Gainsborough Trinity
Total		4	(0)

International career
1972	England Schoolboys	1	(0)
- * Club domestic league appearances and goals

David Nicholls (born 3 November 1956) is an English former professional footballer who played as a midfielder.

== Career ==
Born in Bradford, Newton began his career with Huddersfield Town. He joined Bradford City in August 1975. He made 4 league appearances for the club. He left the club in August 1976 to sign for Gainsborough Trinity.

He also played for England Schools.

== Sources ==
- Frost, Terry (1988). Bradford City A Complete Record 1903-1988. Breedon Books Sport. ISBN 0-907969-38-0.
