= R. G. Nichols =

Anglican clergyman (1888–1960)

Reginald Gordon Clement Nichols (11 February 1888 – 18 July 1960) was an Anglican clergyman in Melbourne, Victoria.

== History ==
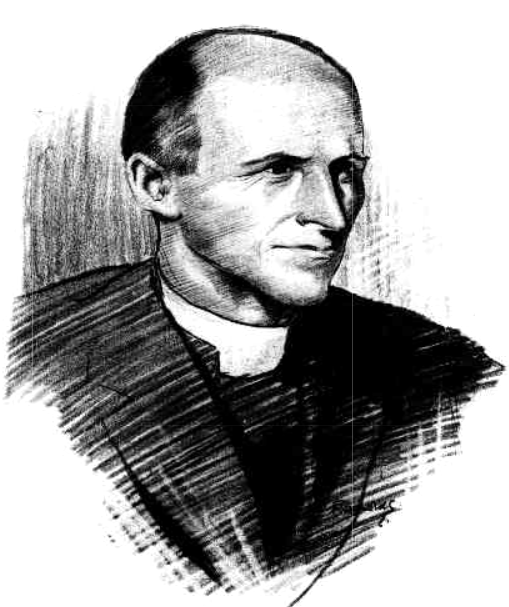
1929 portrait by Reynolds

Nichols was born in Woodlands, New South Wales, son of Alfred Harvey Nichols and Maria Nichols, née Clements. He was educated at Fort Street School, and was first employed at Burns, Philp & Co. in Sydney, later in Townsville. In 1910 Nichols he left for Victoria and in 1912 entered Ridley College, at the University of Melbourne, studying for the Anglican ministry and was ordained deacon in 1913. He graduated BA with Honours in 1914, winning the Laurie Prize. In 1915 he graduated from the Australian College of Theology and was ordained a priest. He graduated Diploma of Education in 1916 and M.A. in 1917.

In 1922 he was appointed to St Mark's Anglican church, Fitzroy. He proved to be unconventional priest: he augmented his Christmas services with movies and established a working men's club. Throughout the Great Depression he organised "penny dinners" for schoolchildren and established a farm for unemployed boys at Lysterfield.

He was a popular radio personality, broadcasting as "Brother Bill" on 3LO and later on commercial stations.

In 1942 he left St Mark's for Townsville, where he founded a hostel for servicemen. He resigned the priesthood after being convicted of sending obscene letters to certain women in Victoria, purporting them to be from soldiers.

== Recognition ==
Nichols was appointed M.B.E. in 1941.

== Family ==
Nichols married Alice Emily Wilson on 12 July 1916; they had three children.
