= Oscar Nichols House =

Historic house in Iowa, United States

- U.S. National Register of Historic Places
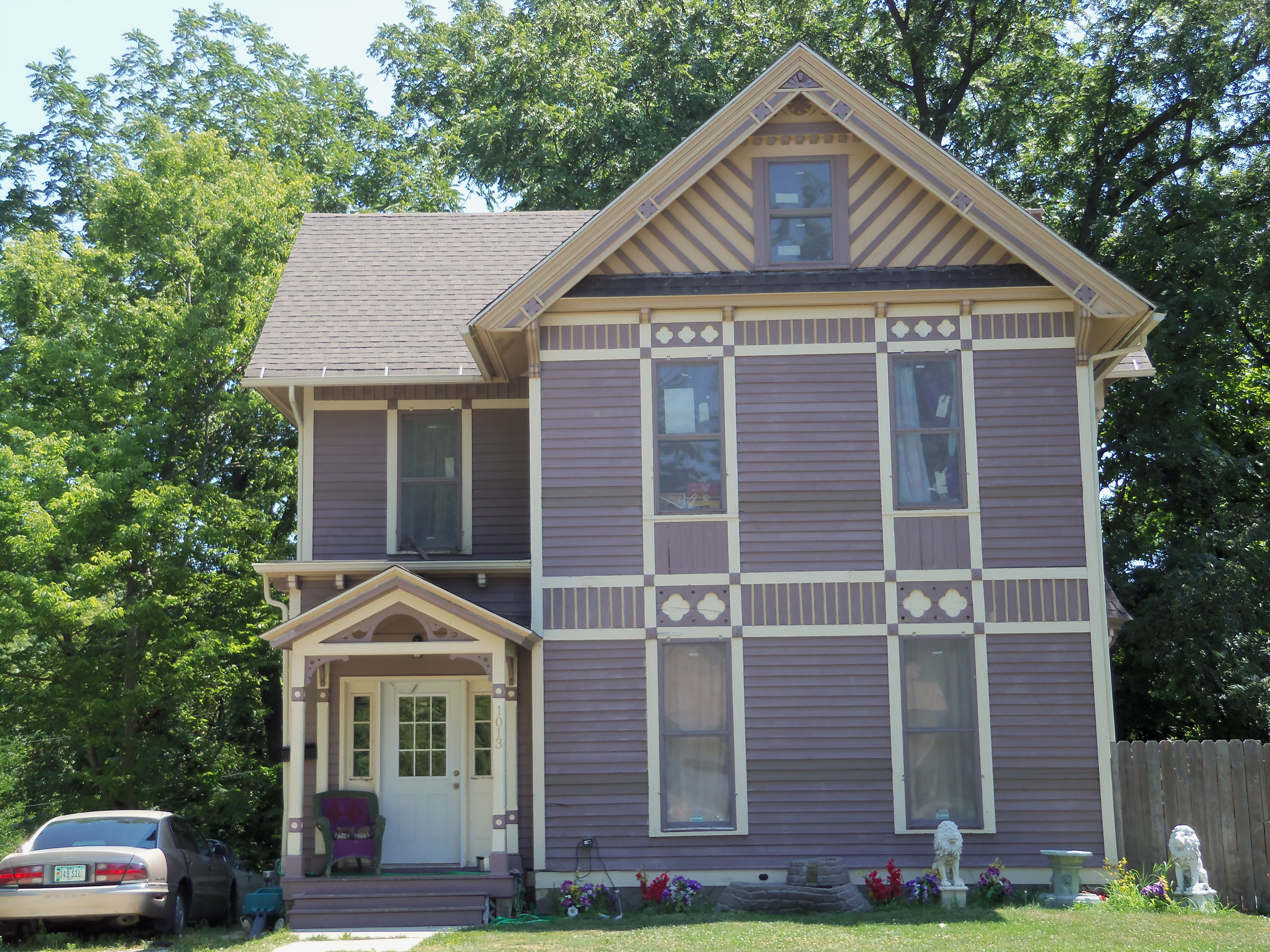

- Location within Iowa Location within the United States
- Location: 1013 Tremont St. Davenport, Iowa
- Coordinates: 41°31′50″N 90°33′39″W
- Area: less than one acre
- Built: 1884
- Architectural style: Stick-Eastlake
- MPS: Davenport MRA
- NRHP reference No.: 83002477
- Added to NRHP: July 7, 1983

The Oscar Nichols House is a historic building located on the east side of Davenport, Iowa, United States. The house was built in 1884 by Oscar P. Nichols, who was a partner in the Davenport Nursery. The house is an example of Stick-Eastlake style of architecture. It is a version of the Queen Anne style where the wooden strips were applied to the exterior of the structure in vertical, horizontal. and on the diagonal to give it a basket-like quality. Other decorative elements applied to exterior of this house include the decoratively carved front porch that features an openwork tympanum at its gable end, the diagonal stickwork in the front gable end, a belt course of vertical strips between the first and second floor and molded vergeboards. It has been listed on the National Register of Historic Places since 1983.
