= Daniel Nichols Homestead =

Historic house in Massachusetts, United States

- U.S. National Register of Historic Places
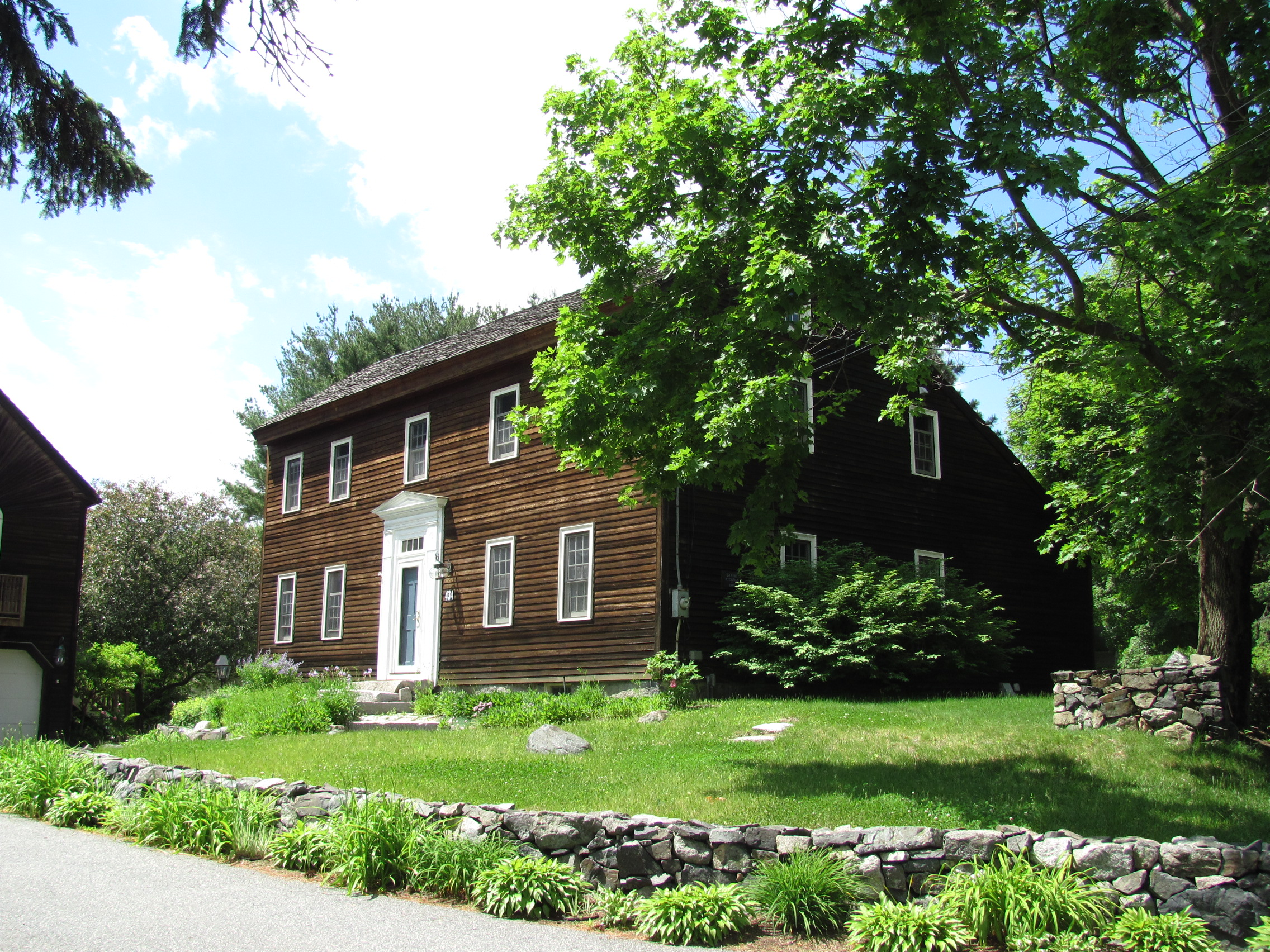
- Daniel Nichols Homestead

- Location within Massachusetts Location within the United States
- Location: 434 Haverhill Street, Reading, Massachusetts
- Coordinates: 42°32′43″N 71°5′28″W
- Built: 1742
- Architectural style: Georgian, Saltbox Colonial
- MPS: Reading MRA
- NRHP reference No.: 84002753
- Added to NRHP: July 19, 1984

The Daniel Nichols Homestead is a historic home in Reading, Massachusetts. The oldest portion of this timber-frame house was built in the early 1740, with vernacular Georgian styling. The house is five bays wide and two deep, with a rear shed-roof extension giving the house a saltbox appearance. An ell was added in the mid-19th century. The main architectural detail is the front door surround, which features sidelight windows and recessed, paneled pilasters supporting a tall entablature.

The house was listed on the National Register of Historic Places in 1984.

== See also ==
- National Register of Historic Places listings in Reading, Massachusetts
- National Register of Historic Places listings in Middlesex County, Massachusetts
