= Nickels =

Nickels is a surname. Notable people with the surname include:

== People ==
- Anna B. Nickels (1832-1917), American cactus collector
- Christa Nickels (born 1952), German politician
- Greg Nickels (born 1955), two-term mayor of Seattle, Washington, United States
- Jean Nickels (1917–1985), Luxembourgian sprint canoer
- Jim Nickels (born 1947), American politician
- John L. Nickels (1931–2013), American judge
- Kelly Nickels, stage name of Henri Perret (born 1962), bass guitarist of the hard rock band L.A. Guns

== See also ==
- Nickels Grill & Bar, a Canadian restaurant chain
- Nickels Arcade, a commercial building in Ann Arbor, Michigan, United States
