= Nichols–Sterner House =

Historic house in Massachusetts, United States

- Nichols–Sterner
- U.S. National Register of Historic Places
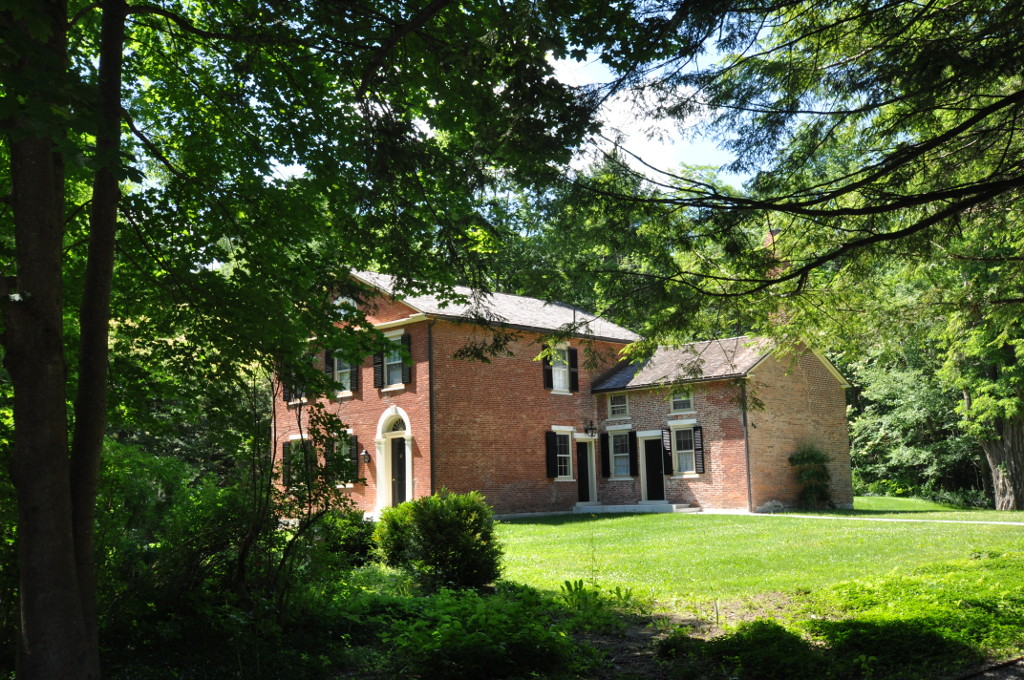

- Location within Massachusetts Location within the United States
- Location: 428 Swamp Rd., Richmond, Massachusetts
- Coordinates: 42°24′20″N 73°19′10″W
- Area: 2.2 acres (0.89 ha)
- Built: c. 1820
- Built by: Nichols, William
- Architectural style: Greek Revival, Federal
- NRHP reference No.: 87001997
- Added to NRHP: September 17, 1987

The Nichols–Sterner House is a historic house at 428 Swamp Road in Richmond, Massachusetts. Built about 1820, it is one of only two brick houses built in a Federalist-Greek Revival transition style in Richmond. It was listed on the National Register of Historic Places in 1987.

== Description and history ==
The Nichols–Sterner House is located in a rural setting of northern Richmond, on the north side of Swamp Road, a historically major road connecting Pittsfield and West Stockbridge. It is a 2 1/2-story brick building, with a gabled roof and a south-facing facade. The facade is three bays wide, with the main entrance in the right bay, framed by pilasters and topped by a keystoned round-arch transom window. The gable above is fully pedimented, with a keystoned half-round window at its center. A contemporaneous 1 1/2-story brick ell extends to the right from the rear corner. The interior retains original Federal woodwork, including fireplace mantels, doors, and trim. The main hall's trim has been given a marbleized finish, and its walls are painted with scenes of the Erie Canal. This artwork is the work of Albert Sterner, the second occupant of the house.

The house was built in 1820 and occupied for over 100 years by the local Nichols family. In 1925, the house was sold to Flora Lash Sterner, wife of artist and illustrator Albert Sterner. The Sterners used the house as a summer residence until Albert's death in 1946. Mrs. Sterner did not use the house thereafter, and it suffered from the neglect. She sold the house in 1981, and the new owners undertook steps to restore the property.

== See also ==
- National Register of Historic Places listings in Berkshire County, Massachusetts
