= Nickless =

Nickless is a surname. Notable people with the surname include:

- Arthur Nickless (1879–1915), Australian rules footballer
- R. Walker Nickless (born 1947), American Roman Catholic bishop
