= John Nichol (footballer) =

English footballer

Personal information
- Date of birth: 1879
- Place of birth: Morpeth, Northumberland, England
- Position: Winger

Senior career*
Years	Team	Apps	(Gls)
1902–1903	Morpeth Harriers		
1903–1904	Grimsby Town	16	(3)
- * Club domestic league appearances and goals

John Nichol (1879 – after 1903) was an English professional footballer who played as a winger.
