= The American Sociologist =

- Discipline: Sociology
- Language: English
- Edited by: Lawrence T. Nichols

Publication details
- History: 1965—1982, 1987—present
- Publisher: Springer Science+Business Media
- Frequency: Quarterly
- Open access: Hybrid

Standard abbreviations
- ISO 4: Am. Sociol.

Indexing
- ISSN: 0003-1232 (print); 1936-4784 (web)
- LCCN: 65009976
- JSTOR: 00031232
- OCLC no.: 1411199

Links
- Journal homepage; Online access; Online archive

The American Sociologist is a quarterly peer-reviewed academic journal covering sociology with special emphasis on topics of broad concern to the profession and the discipline. It was established in 1965 and published by the American Sociological Association until suspended in 1982. It resumed in 1987 when it was taken over by Transaction Publishers. Transaction sold its journal publishing program to Springer Science+Business Media in 2007.

== Abstracting and indexing ==
The journal is abstracted and indexed in:

- Academic OneFile
- EBSCO databases
- FRANCIS
- International Bibliography of Periodical Literature
- International Bibliography of the Social Sciences
- PASCAL
- ProQuest databases
- Scopus
- SocINDEX
- Sociological Abstracts
