= Thomas E. Nichols =

American statistician

- Education: Carnegie Mellon University
- Known for: Statistical analysis of brain imaging data
- Scientific career
- Fields: Neuroimaging; Statistics
- Workplaces: University of Michigan; GlaxoSmithKline; University of Warwick; University of Oxford
- Thesis: Spatiotemporal Modeling of Positron Emission Tomography (2001)
- Doctoral advisor: William F. Eddy

Thomas E. Nichols is an American statistician. He is Professor of Neuroimaging Statistics and a Wellcome Trust Senior Research Fellow in Basic Biomedical Science at the Nuffield Department of Population Health of the University of Oxford, where he is also affiliated with the Big Data Institute. Previously, he taught in the Department of Biostatistics at the University of Michigan and at the University of Warwick; he also worked for GlaxoSmithKline as director of modeling and genetics at their Clinical Imaging Centre. He received the Wiley Young Investigator Award from the Organization for Human Brain Mapping in 2009 and was elected a Fellow of the American Statistical Association in 2012.
