= John Nicholl (antiquary) =

English antiquary

John Nicholl F.S.A. (1790–1871) was an English antiquary.

== Life ==
Nicholl was born at Stratford Green, Essex. His father, a brewer, died a few months later. In 1822 he married Elizabeth Sarah Rahn, whose family had arrived in England from France following the revocation of the Edict of Nantes. They had three sons (Edward Hadham, John and Conrad Rahn) and two daughters (Elizabeth and Mary Augusta). He died at his home in Islington and was buried at Theydon Garnon, Essex.

Nicholl extended an interest in his own family's genealogy to that of the wider Essex gentry and worked on the archives of the Ironmongers Company (of which he was a member). In 1842 and 1843 he traveled in Europe, compiling architectural and landscape sketches and collecting further genealogical material. In 1843 he became a fellow of the Society of Antiquaries of London. He compiled a History of the Ironmongers Company, which he served as master in 1859. He also wrote poetry, a collection of which he had privately printed.
