= Richard Nichols House =

Historic house in Massachusetts, United States

- U.S. National Register of Historic Places
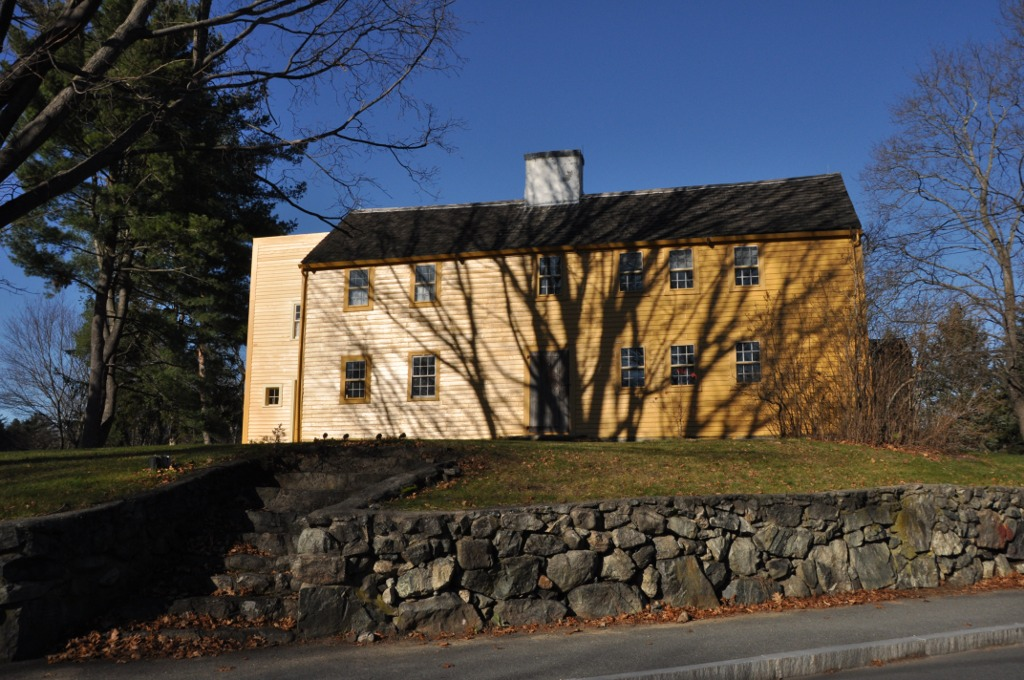

- Location within Massachusetts Location within the United States
- Location: Reading, Massachusetts
- Coordinates: 42°32′40.76″N 71°7′14.47″W
- Area: 1.3 acres (0.53 ha)
- Built: 1733
- MPS: Reading MRA
- NRHP reference No.: 84002760
- Added to NRHP: July 19, 1984

The Richard Nichols House is a historic late First Period house at 483 Franklin Street in Reading, Massachusetts, United States. It is a 2 1/2-story wood-frame structure, six bays wide, with a side-gable roof, clapboard siding, rubblestone foundation, and an entry in the third bay from the left, with a chimney behind. The oldest portion of this house, probably a three-bay section with chimney, was built c. 1733, and expanded to five, and then six, bays later in the 18th century. The house, along with extensive landholdings, remained in the locally prominent Nichols family until the late 19th century.

The house was listed on the National Register of Historic Places in 1984.

== See also ==
- National Register of Historic Places listings in Reading, Massachusetts
- National Register of Historic Places listings in Middlesex County, Massachusetts
