= John H. Nichols House =

Historic house in Ohio, United States

- U.S. National Register of Historic Places
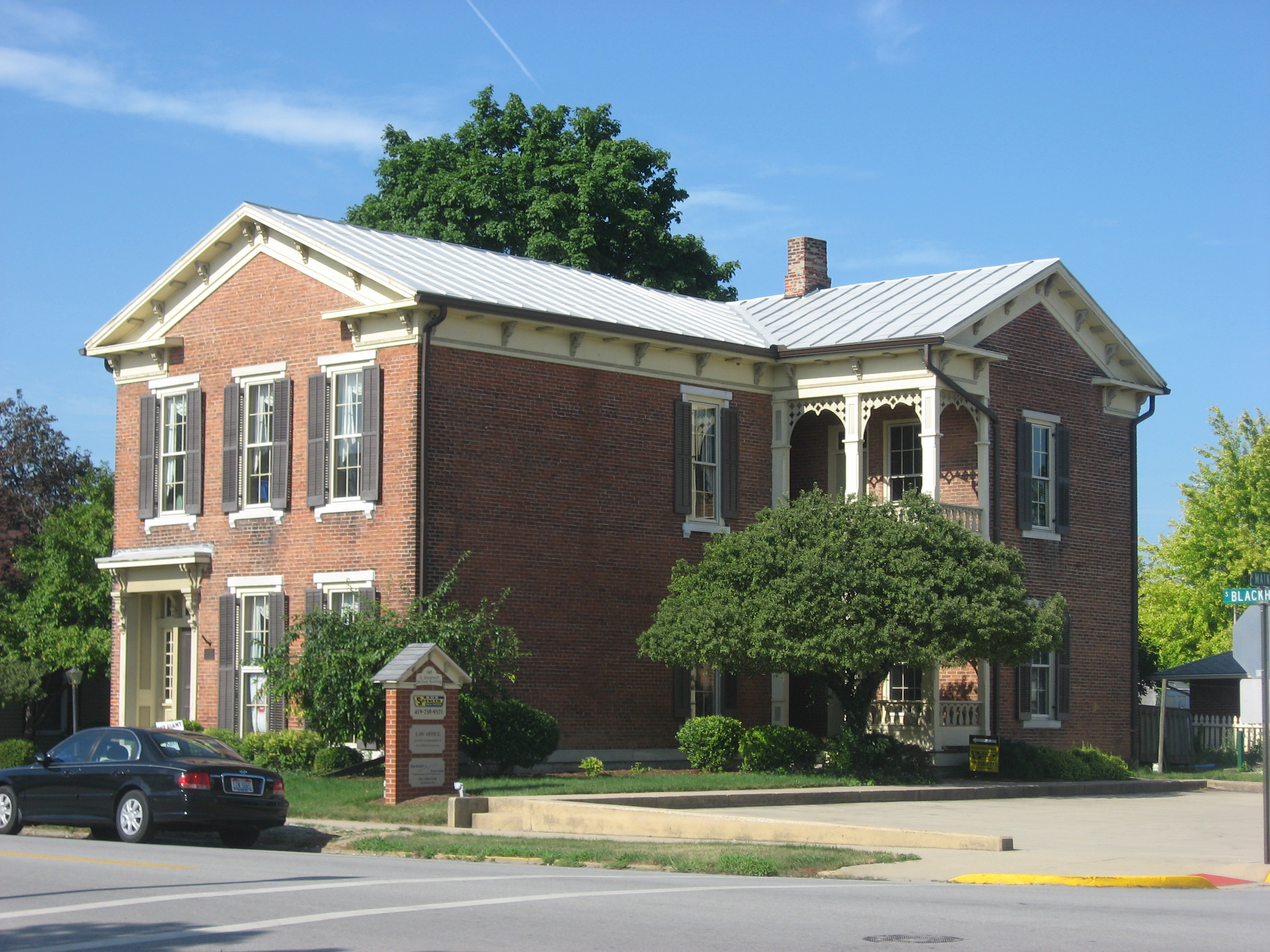
- Front and northern side of the house

- Location within Ohio Location within the United States
- Location: 103 S. Blackhoof St., Wapakoneta, Ohio
- Coordinates: 40°34′10″N 84°11′47″W
- Area: less than one acre
- Built: 1865
- Architect: Thomas and William Nichols
- Architectural style: Greek Revival, Italianate, Gothic Revival
- NRHP reference No.: 88001064
- Added to NRHP: July 14, 1988

The John H. Nichols House is a historic house in downtown Wapakoneta, Ohio, United States. Built in 1865, it is Wapakoneta's oldest example of the Greek Revival style of architecture. Among its leading features are a three-bay facade with a prominent gable, large entablature, and cornices under the roof, several large windows on the front and sides, and a trabeated entryway framed by several sidelights and a transom supported by two brackets.

== History ==
One of Wapakoneta's earliest physicians, John H. Nichols designed his two-story, seventeen-room house in the plan of a cross, patterning it after a house in Virginia with which he was familiar. The house's brick walls rest on a foundation of limestone and are covered with a tin roof, and elements of wood and limestone are prominent on the exterior. Inside, walnut wood is dominant, including on the house's massive central fireplace. Among the original windowpanes is one on which several of Nichols' children incised their names.

Built by Thomas and William Nichols, the owner's brothers, the Nichols House soon became the core of Wapakoneta's oldest major residential section. Six other large brick houses were built immediately west of the city center between 1865 and 1875. Like the Nichols House, these structures were erected for prominent members of Wapakoneta society, including its social and political leaders. Since the Nichols family, the house has changed hands very rarely; it had only four owners in its first century. By the late 1970s, it had been purchased by a photographer, who used it for both home and studio. To expand its uses for photography purposes, the house has been slightly modified by the addition of a brick patio and a white picket fence.

In recognition of its high quality of preservation, the Nichols House was listed on the National Register of Historic Places in 1988, because of the significance of its architecture in local history. Today, the house is home to the law office of Jauert & Burton, before which it had been office space for the Ron Spencer Real Estate Agency.
