= Jack C. Nichols =

American politician

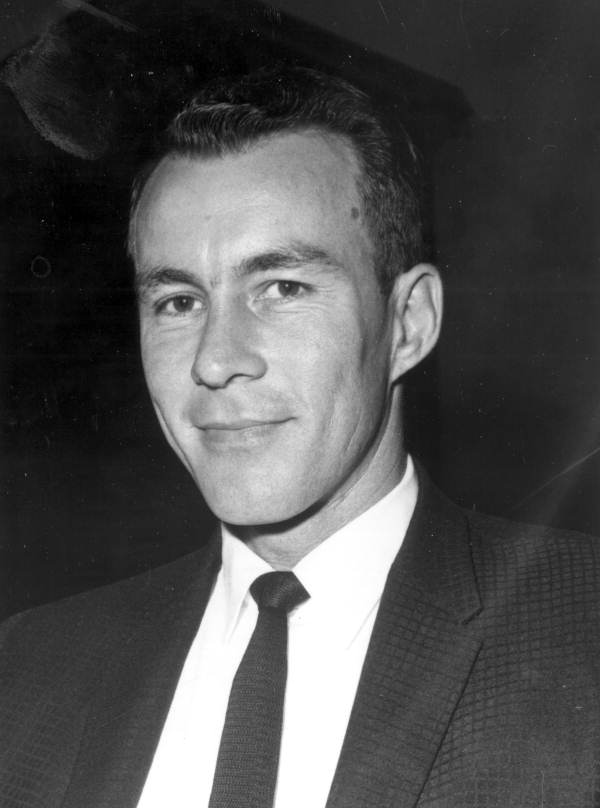
- Nichols in 1961

Member of the Florida House of Representatives from Okaloosa County
- In office 1961–1962 Serving with James H. Wise
- Preceded by: Charles D. Stewart
- Succeeded by: Maurice McLaughlin

Personal details
- Born: February 2, 1930
- Died: August 6, 2007 (aged 77)
- Party: Democratic

Jack C. Nichols (February 2, 1930 – August 6, 2007) was an American politician. He served as a Democratic member of the Florida House of Representatives.

In 1961, Nichols won the election for an office of the Florida House of Representatives, in which he served until 1962. He succeeded Charles D. Stewart and served along with James H. Wise. Nichols was succeeded by Maurice McLaughlin in November 1962.
