= Jonathan Nichols (Oklahoma politician) =

American politician (1965–2019)

Member of the Oklahoma Senate from the 15th district
- In office 2000–2012
- Preceded by: Trish Weedn
- Succeeded by: Rob Standridge

Personal details
- Born: Jonathan Edgar Nichols; November 14, 1965 Bad Hersfeld, West Germany
- Died: June 5, 2019 (aged 53) Norman, Oklahoma, U.S.
- Party: Republican
- Children: 2
- Website: Senator Nichols' Senate Website (2008 snapshot)

Jonathan Edgar Nichols (November 14, 1965 – June 5, 2019) was an American politician who served as a member of the Oklahoma Senate from 2000 to 2012. He was a member of the Republican Party. Prior to that, he was an attorney and became Assistant District Attorney in Cleveland County.

== Early life and education ==
Born in Bad Hersfeld, West Germany, Nichols lived in Norman, Oklahoma. He graduated from Northeastern State University and received his Juris Doctor degree from University of Oklahoma College of Law in 1993.

== Career ==
Nichols was an assistant district attorney in Cleveland County for over six years. As an assistant district attorney, Nichols represented the State of Oklahoma in the prosecution of Kevin Ott. Following the trial, Ott's sentence of life without parole for possession of 3.5 ounces of methamphetamine was the subject of several national news articles and an award-winning documentary produced by actors Brad Pitt, and Danny Glover, and musical artist John Legend. Nichols left the district attorney's office to pursue a career in politics. He was elected to the Oklahoma Senate in November 2000. He was re-elected two times, in 2004 and 2008, and became chairman of the Rules Committee of the Oklahoma Senate. He left office in 2013 when term limits prevented him from seeking a fourth term in office. Between 2016 and 2018, he served as vice president of government relations at the University of Oklahoma. Prior to his death, he worked as a Senior Policy Advisor for Oklahoma House Speaker Charles McCall.

== Personal life ==
Nichols was married and had two daughters. On June 5, 2019, Nichols was found dead of an apparent gunshot wound at his home in Norman. His death was investigated as a possible homicide because "the firearm believed to have caused the wound was in an unexpected position," according to a police affidavit, with The Oklahoman reporting that undisclosed law enforcement sources told them that a gun was found on a table across the room from the body. However, police ultimately determined that the gunshot wound was self-inflicted and ruled out foul play, concluding their investigation on June 27, 2019.

== Awards and honors ==
In 2001, he received the Most Courageous Legislator Award from the Higher Education Council of Oklahoma.

== Election results ==
November 4, 2008, Election results for Oklahoma State Senator for District 15
| Candidates | Party | Votes | % |
|---|---|---|---|
| Jonathan Nichols | Republican | 23,125 | 60.63% |
| Diane M. Drum | Democratic | 15,019 | 39.37% |

November 2, 2004, Election results for Oklahoma State Senator for District 15
| Candidates | Party | Votes | % |
|---|---|---|---|
| Jonathan Nichols | Republican | 20,526 | 57.41% |
| Lisa Pryor | Democratic | 15,228 | 42.59% |

November 7, 2000, Election results for Oklahoma State Senator for District 15
| Candidates | Party | Votes | % |
|---|---|---|---|
| Jonathan Nichols | Republican | 16,722 | 56.22% |
| Pat Martin | Democratic | 13,021 | 43.78% |
