= John Nicholl (mariner) =

John Nicholl (fl. 1605–1637?) was an English mariner and author who joined an expedition to the English colony Guiana in 1605. He was shipwrecked and rescued by Spaniards who imprisoned him as a spy. He returned to England in 1607 and published an account of his adventures.

== Life ==
He was one of 67 Englishmen who on 12 April 1605 sailed in the Olive Branch, at the charge of Sir Olyff Leigh, to join the colony which had been planted by Captain Charles Leigh on the river "Wiapica" (Oyapoc) in Guiana, their leader being Captain Nicholas St. John. Off course, after 17 weeks at sea, they put in at Saint Lucia in the West Indies. Here St. John decided to remain for a time with Nicholl and his party, and to allow the vessel to go home.

At first the Carib people were friendly, but later they attacked the new settlers. After a truce, Nicholl's party, nineteen in all, rigged and provisioned one of their periaguas, and on 26 September they left Saint Lucia. On 5 October they were wrecked on a barren island just off the mainland. Having patched up their canoe, five of the party embarked for the mainland (Venezuela), but Nicholl and his comrades suffered from hunger and thirst on the island for fifteen days. They were ultimately rescued by the Spaniards and taken to Tocuyo, and then to Santa Ana de Coro.

The English party were brought before the governor, but through the intervention of a Fleming were not sent to the galleys. After five months at Coro, Nicholl and two of his companions embarked in a frigate bound for Carthagena in New Granada on 30 April 1606. Here on 10 May, four days after their arrival, they were committed to prison as spies, but found friends, Spanish as well as English, and were released after two months, and in August were sent to Havana on Cuba, in a fleet of Spanish galleons.

About 10 October 1606 Nicholl sailed from Havana for Spain, reaching Cádiz on 15 December. Meeting with an English skipper, he was landed safely at the Downs in Kent on 2 February 1607.

== Works ==
Nicholl published shortly in London an account of his adventures, entitled An Houre Glasse of Indian Newes. Or a ... Discourse, shewing the ... Miseries ... indured by 67 Englishmen, which were sent for a Supply to the Planting in Guiana in the Yeare 1605, London, 1607. He dedicated it to Sir Thomas Smythe.
