= David A. Nichols =

American judge (1917–1997)

David Arthur Nichols (August 6, 1917 – June 21, 1997), of Lincolnville, Maine, was a justice of the Maine Supreme Judicial Court from May 24, 1977, to May 31, 1988.

Born in Lincolnville, Waldo County, Maine, Nichols "grew up over his family's gas station along U.S. Route 1." He attended Bates College in Lewiston, Maine, and received a JD from the University of Michigan. Nichols served in the U.S. Army Air Force during World War II, and thereafter entered private practice in Camden, Maine.

He held a number of political positions, serving as a Maine delegate to the 1952 Republican National Convention; a member of Maine Governor's Council from 1955 to 1957; and as the chair of the Maine Republican Party from 1960 to 1964.

Nichols recalled that he had no interest in serving in the state judiciary, but he was appointed to the Maine Superior Court "after then-Gov. James B. Longley arrived in a helicopter in front of Mr. Nichols' Lincolnville Beach home in 1975 and asked him to serve". He thereafter served as an associate justice of Maine Supreme Judicial Court from 1977 to 1988. In 1985, Nichols wrote the unanimous decision of the court upholding the conviction of serial killer James Hicks.

Nichols was never married. He died in a Lincolnville area hospital.
