= Jon Nichols =

English footballer

Personal information
- Full name: Jonathan Anthony Nichols
- Date of birth: 10 September 1981 (age 45)
- Place of birth: Plymouth, England
- Position: Full back

Youth career
- –1999: Torquay United

Senior career*
| Years | Team | Apps | (Gls) |
| 1999–2000 | Torquay United | 7 | (0) |
| 2000–2001 | Dorchester Town | | |
| 2001–2005 | Team Bath | | |
| 2005 | Rugby Town | | |
| 2005–2006 | Rugby Town | | |
| 2006–? | Wingate & Finchley | | |
- * Club domestic league appearances and goals

Jonathan Anthony Nichols (born 10 September 1981) is an English former professional footballer.

Nichols signed for Torquay United on a YTS apprenticeship, making his debut whilst still an apprentice on 2 March 1999 in a 2–0 defeat away to Leyton Orient, with another five league appearances before the end of the season leading to him being awarded the club's Young Player of the Year Award. Although expected to make a breakthrough the following season, Nichols only made one further league appearance and was released at the end of the season, joining Dorchester Town on a free transfer in August 2000.

In the 2001 close season he joined Team Bath and won player of the year awards while studying at the University of Bath.

Nichols joined Rugby Town towards the end of the 2004–05 season, but left due to working in the South of England. He spent the 2005 pre-season with AFC Wimbledon, but returned to Rugby Town in August 2005.

In February 2006 Nicholls moved to London for work and joined Wingate & Finchley.
