= Mark Nichols (journalist) =

Mark Edgar Nichols (February 11, 1873 – May 1, 1961) was a Canadian newspaper journalist and editor.

The son of Thomas Nichols and Elizabeth Graham, both natives of Scotland, he was born in Bronte, Ontario. Nichols was first a proofreader and then a reporter for the Toronto Telegram. In 1897, he became parliamentary reporter in Ottawa for the paper. Nichols went on to be writer and editor for The Toronto World, president and editor for the Winnipeg Telegram and president for the Montreal Daily Mail and the Montreal Daily News.

During World War I, he served two years as head of the Canadian Department of Public Information. Next, Nichols served as vice-president and managing director for the Winnipeg Tribune for 15 years. He was one of the founding members of the Canadian Western Associated Press in 1907 and served as its first president. In 1917, he was a founder of The Canadian Press, serving as a director for 15 years and as its president from 1931 to 1932. Nichols served as publisher for the Vancouver Province, He retired from journalism in 1945.

Nichols died in Vancouver at the age of 88.
