= Nicholson (surname) =

- Pronunciation: /ˈnɪkəlsən/
- Language: English

Origin
- Origin: Scottish
- Meaning: derived from the Greek word "Nikolaos" meaning "conqueror of people"

Other names
- Variant form: Nicolson

Nicholson is a Germanic and Scottish surname. It is a patronymic form of the given name Nichol, which was a common medieval form of Nicholas. Notable people with the surname include:

- Aideen Nicholson (1927–2019), Irish-born Canadian politician
- A. J. Nicholson (born 1983), American football linebacker
- Alexander Malcolm Nicholson (1900–1991), Canadian clergyman, farmer, and politician
- Alfred O. P. Nicholson (1808–1876), United States Senator from Tennessee
- Alistair Nicholson (born 1978), Australian rules footballer
- Anna Nicholson (born 1995), British para-athlete
- Anne-Marie Nicholson (born 1991), English singer and songwriter known as Anne-Marie (singer)
- Archibald Keightley Nicholson (1871–1937), British ecclesiastical stained-glass maker
- Arthur D. Nicholson, (1947–1985) U.S. Army officer
- Asenath Nicholson (1792–1855), American activist, writer and philanthropist
- Barry Nicholson (born 1978), Scottish footballer
- Ben Nicholson (1894–1982), English abstract painter (married to Winifred Nicholson)
- Bill Nicholson (disambiguation), several people
- Bob Nicholson (disambiguation), several people
- Bobby Nicholson (1918–1993), American musician and actor
- Bruce Nicholson, special effects artist
- Sir Charles Nicholson, 1st Baronet, of Luddenham (1808–1903), British–Australian politician
- Sir Charles Nicholson, 2nd Baronet (1867–1949), British ecclesiastical architect
- Charles Ernest Nicholson, (1868–1954) British yacht designer
- Chris Nicholson (athlete) (born 1967), New Zealand Olympian, competing in cycling and speed skating
- Chris Nicholson (magician), British close up magician
- Chris Nicholson (sailor) (born 1969), Australian Olympic yachtsman
- Chris Nicholson (judge) (born 1945), South African cricketer and jurist
- Christopher Nicholson (architect) (1904–1948), British architect and designer
- Claude Nicholson (rugby league) (1892–1951), Australian rugby league footballer of the 1910s
- Claude Nicholson (British Army), (1898–1943) British Brigadier, in command of Calais during the Siege of Calais (1940)
- Danell Nicholson (born 1967), American boxer
- David Nicholson (disambiguation), several people
- DeCarlos Nicholson (born 2001), American football player
- Donald Nicholson (disambiguation), multiple people
- Donte Nicholson (born 1981), American NFL football player
- Ed Nicholson (1923–1987), Canadian ice hockey player
- Edward Nicholson (disambiguation), several people
  - Edward Max Nicholson (1904–2003), Irish-born English founder of World Wildlife Fund
  - Edward Williams Byron Nicholson (1849–1912), Bodley's Librarian
- Eliza Jane Nicholson (1843–1896), American journalist
- Elliot Nicholson (1871–1953), English rugby union player
- Emma Nicholson, Baroness Nicholson of Winterbourne (born 1941), British politician
- Rev Ernest Nicholson (1938–2013), British biblical scholar
- Florence I. Nicholson (1866–1931), English vegetarianism activist
- Francis Nicholson (1655–1727/8), British military officer and colonial governor
- Francis Nicholson (painter) (1753–1844), British artist
- Frank Nicholson (disambiguation), several people
- Geoff Nicholson (1953–2025), British novelist and non-fiction writer
- George Nicholson (printer) (1760–1825), British printer
- George Nicholson (footballer), English footballer
- Sir Godfrey Nicholson (1901–1991), British Conservative Party politician
- Grace Nicholson (1877–1948), American art collector and art dealer
- Graham Nicholson (born 2002), American football player
- Harold James Nicholson (born 1950), CIA officer convicted of spying for Russia
- Helen Nicholson (disambiguation), several people
- Henry Alleyne Nicholson (1816–1878), British paleontologist and zoologist
- Howard Nicholson (1912–2014), English physician
- Isaac R. Nicholson (1789/1790–1844), associate justice of the Supreme Court of Mississippi
- J. C. Nicholson (born 1942), American judge
- Jack Nicholson (born 1937), American actor
- Jack Nicholson (footballer) (1892–1967), Australian rules footballer
- James W. Nicholson (1821–1887), U.S. Navy officer during Mexican–American War and Civil War
- Jenny Nicholson, American video essayist
- Jim Nicholson (U.S. politician) (born 1938), United States Secretary of Veterans Affairs
- Jimmy Nicholson (Northern Irish footballer), (1943–2025) Northern Irish footballer
- Joe Nicholson (1898–1978), English footballer
- John Nicholson (disambiguation), several people
- Joseph Hopper Nicholson (1770–1817), American lawyer, jurist, and politician from Maryland
- Joseph Shield Nicholson (1850–1927), English economist
- Joyce Nicholson (1919–2011), Australian author
- Julianne Nicholson (born 1971), American actress
- Julie Nicholson, British author and former vicar
- John Kenyon Nicholson, American playwright
- Ken Nicholson, video game developer and Windows graphics pioneer
- Kevin Nicholson (disambiguation), several people
- Leonard Nicholson (1904–1983), tenth Commissioner of the Royal Canadian Mounted Police (1951–1959)
- Lillie May Nicholson (1884–1964), American painter
- Lorna Schultz Nicholson, Canadian children's writer
- Lorraine Nicholson, American actress, daughter of Jack Nicholson
- Lawson Nicholson (1866–1947), Washington state pioneer, engineer, and surveyor
- Malcolm Wheeler-Nicholson (1890–1965), American pulp magazine writer and comic book pioneer
- Marie Nicholson (born 1976), Swedish politician
- Marjorie Nicholson (1914–1997), British activist
- Matthew Nicholson (born 1974), Australian cricketer
- Mavis Nicholson (1930–2022), Welsh writer and radio and television broadcaster
- Meredith Nicholson (1866–1947), American author and politician
- Meredith Merle Nicholson (1913–2005), American cinematographer
- Michael Nicholson (1937–2016), English journalist
- Michael Nicholson (academic) (born 1941), American academic
- Montae Nicholson (born 1995), American football player
- Nancy Nicholson (1899–1977), British painter and fabric designer
- Natalie Nicholson (born 1976), American curler
- Neil Nicholson (cricketer), (English cricketer)
- Nigel Nicholson, British psychologist
- Norman Nicholson (1914–1987), English poet
- Ossie Nicholson (1906–1965), Australian cyclist
- Parson Nicholson (1863–1917), American Major League Baseball player
- Paul Nicholson (ice hockey) (1954–2011), Canadian ice hockey forward
- Paul Nicholson (industrialist) (born 1938), British industrialist
- Paul Nicholson (darts player) (born 1979), English-born Australian darts player
- Peter Nicholson (architect) (1765–1844), British architect, engineer and mathematician
- Peter Nicholson (cartoonist) (born 1946), Australian political cartoonist
- Ray Nicholson (born 1992), American actor
- Reginald Nicholson (1869–1946), English politician
- Reginald F. Nicholson (1852–1939), United States Navy admiral
- Reynold A. Nicholson (1868–1945), British orientalist
- Rhys Nicholson (born 1990), Australian comedian and actor
- Richard Nicholson (composer) (c1570–1639), English composer
- Richard Nicholson (Paralympian) (dates unknown), Australian paralympics competitor
- Rob Nicholson (musician) (born 1969), also known as "Blasko", American rock music performer
- Rob Nicholson (politician) (born 1952), Canadian Member of Parliament
- Robert Nicholson (disambiguation), several people
  - Robert Nicholson (judge), Australian jurist
  - Robert Nicholson (Indian Army officer) (1745–1821), British military officer in Bombay
  - Robert Nicholson (piper) (1798–1842), Northumbrian piper
  - Robert B. Nicholson (1863–1917), businessman in Kalgoorlie, Western Australia
- Roscoe Nicholson (1887–1959), American surveyor and conservationist
- Ross Nicholson (born 1975), New Zealand football goalkeeper
- Roxie Nicholson (born 1950), U.S. Department of Labor welfare policy analyst
- Russ Nicholson, British illustrator
- Samuel Nicholson (disambiguation), several people
- Seth Barnes Nicholson (1891–1963), American astronomer
- Shane Nicholson (footballer) (born 1970), English footballer
- Sharon Nicholson, American climatologist
- Simon Nicholson, British painter and sculptor
- Skonk Nicholson (1917–2011), South African rugby coach
- Stan Nicholson, rugby league footballer of the 1950s, 1960s and 1970s
- Stevie Nicholson (born 1983), Australian television personality
- Stuart Nicholson (footballer) (1987), English footballer
- Stuart Nicholson (jazz historian) (1948), British music journalist, music critic, and academic
- Stuart Nicholson, vocalist and songwriter with English progressive rock band Galahad (band)
- Sir Sydney Nicholson (1875–1947), English choir director, organist, composer, founder of the Royal College of Music
- Tahveon Nicholson (born 2000), American football player
- Thomas Nicolson (disambiguation), several people
- Tony Nicholson (1938–1985), English cricketer
- Viv Nicholson (1936–2015), British gambling winner and tabloid target
- Wayne L. Nicholson, American microbiologist and scientist
- William Nicholson (disambiguation), several people
- Winifred Nicholson (née Roberts) (1893–1981), English painter (married to Ben Nicholson)

== See also ==
- Justice Nicholson (disambiguation)
