= Caricatures by Low (1915) =

Book by David Low

Caricatures by Low (New Popular Edition) is a large-format (25 by 37 centimetres (9.8 in × 14.6 in)) 110-page book of drawings by David Low, "collected from the Sydney Bulletin and other sources", and published in 1915 by Tyrrell's Limited, 99 Castlereagh Street, Sydney. The images listed below are out of copyright in the USA but not in Australia.

All copyrightable works published in the United States before 1929 are in the public domain; works created but not published or copyrighted before January 1, 1978, may be protected until 2047. For works that received their copyright before 1978, a renewal had to be filed in the work's 28th year with the Copyright Office for its term of protection to be extended. The need for renewal was eliminated by the Copyright Renewal Act of 1992, but works that had already entered the public domain by non-renewal did not regain copyright protection. Therefore, works published before 1964 that were not renewed are in the public domain. . . . Copyright law in the United States

Besides being author of the drawings, Low was responsible for writing the Foreword, which was praised, as literature, by at least one editor.

Low, who made a speciality of depicting Prime Minister Hughes, followed this publication in 1921 with a modest paperback, The Billy Book devoted to his favorite subject, published and sold by the NSW Bookstall Company.

Filename	Name	Page	Notes
A A Billson 38.jpg	A. A. Billson	38	Used in article 3 August 2024
A A C Cocks 95.jpg	A. A. C. Cocks	95	
A B Moncrieff 96.jpg	A. B. Moncrieff	96	
A B Piddington 104.jpg	A. B. Piddington	104	
A Bruce Smith 27.jpg	A. Bruce Smith	27	
A Campbell Carmichael 35.jpg	A. Campbell Carmichael	35	
A E Morgans 107.jpg	A. E. Morgans	107	
A E Solomon 49.jpg	A. E. Solomon	49	
A G Ralston 70.jpg	A. G. Ralston	70	
A G Sainsbury 104.jpg	A. G. Sainsbury	104	
A H Barlow 40.jpg	A. H. Barlow	40	
A H Peake 47.jpg	A. H. Peake	47	
A H Simpson 69.jpg	A. H. Simpson	69	
A J Thynne 42.jpg	A. J. Thynne	42	
A L Herdman (NZ) 55.jpg	A. L. Herdman	55	
A M Hertzberg 105.jpg	A. M. Hertzberg	105	Used in article 3 August 2024
A R Guinness (NZ) 55.jpg	A. R. Guinness	55	
A W Hogg (NZ) 54.jpg	A. W. Hogg	54	
Adrian Knox 67.jpg	Adrian Knox	67	
Agar Wynne 24.jpg	Agar Wynne	24	
Albert Gould 25.jpg	Albert Gould	25	
Albert Hinchcliffe 40.jpg	Albert Hinchcliffe	40	
Albert Talbot 58.jpg	Albert Talbot	58	Used in article 3 August 2024
Alexander Buchanan 74.jpg	Alexander Buchanan	74	Used in article 3 August 2024
Alexander Godley (NZ) 93.jpg	Alexander Godley	93	
Alexander McCracken 103.jpg	Alexander McCracken	103	Used in article 3 August 2024
Alexander Peacock 37.jpg	Alexander Peacock	37	
Alexandre Chayet 102.jpg	Alexandre Chayet	102	Used in article 3 August 2024
Alf Vincent 89.jpg	Alf Vincent	89	
Alfred Deakin 39.jpg	Alfred Deakin	39	
Alfred Edden 35.jpg	Alfred Edden	35	
Andrew Fisher 20.jpg	Andrew Fisher	20	
Angas Johnson 105.jpg	Angas Johnson	105	
Arthur H Adams 89.jpg	Arthur H. Adams	89	
Arthur Feez 76.jpg	Arthur Feez	76	Used in article 3 August 2024
Arthur Hill Griffith 34.jpg	Arthur Hill Griffith	34	
Arthur Lyulph Stanley 17.jpg	Arthur Lyulph Stanley	17	
Arthur Morgan 41.jpg	Arthur Morgan	41	
Arthur Rutledge 75.jpg	Arthur Rutledge	75	
Atlee Hunt 97.jpg	Atlee Hunt	97	Used in article 3 August 2024
Austin Chapman 26.jpg	Austin Chapman	26	
B J Stubbs 46.jpg	B. J. Stubbs	46	
Baldwin Spencer 104.jpg	Baldwin Spencer	104	
Ben Rounsevell 46.jpg	Ben Rounsevell	46	
Bertram Stevens 89.jpg	Bertram Stevens	89	Used in article 3 August 2024
Billy Hughes 21.jpg	Billy Hughes	21	
Bob Bell 102.jpg	Bob Bell	102	North Coast Steamship company owner
Bob Power 103.jpg	Bob Power	103	Victorian racing identity, died 1914
Bob Sadler 51.jpg	Bob Sadler	51	Used in article 3 August 2024
Bonaventura Cerretti 61.jpg	Bonaventura Cerretti	61	
Byron Moore 103.jpg	H. Byron Moore	103	
C A Bolton 108.jpg	C. A. Bolton	108	Chamber of Mines, Kalgoorlie
C A Jeffries 90.jpg	C. A. Jeffries	90	Used in article 3 August 2024
C E Chubb 75.jpg	C. E. Chubb	75	
C Evans 96.jpg	Charles Evans	96	Used in article 3 August 2024
C G Heydon 69.jpg	C. G. Heydon	69	
C H Goode 107.jpg	C. H. Goode	107	
C J Dennis 87.jpg	C. J. Dennis	87	
C J Z Woinarski 70.jpg	C. J. Z. Woinarski	70	Used in article 3 August 2024
C P Skerrett 80.jpg	C. P. Skerrett	80	
C Powers, F Gavan Duffy, G E Rich 66.jpg	Charles Powers	66	group portrait
C Powers, F Gavan Duffy, G E Rich 66.jpg	F. Gavan Duffy	66	group portrait
C Powers, F Gavan Duffy, G E Rich 66.jpg	G. E. Rich	66	group portrait
Charles Bowen (NZ) 55.jpg	Charles Bowen	55	
Charles Gregory Wade 33.jpg	Charles Gregory Wade	33	
Charles Riley 62.jpg	Charles Riley	62	
Charles Rocher 109.jpg	Charles Rocher	109	Town Clerk of Launceston
Charles Russen 50.jpg	Charles Russen	50	Used in article 3 August 2024
Chris Watson 30.jpg	Chris Watson	30	
Christopher Brennan 87.jpg	Christopher Brennan	87	
Churchill Julius (NZ) 64.jpg	Churchill Julius	64	
Crawford Vaughan 47.jpg	Crawford Vaughan	47	
D V Hennessy 95.jpg	D. V. Hennessy	95	Used in article 3 August 2024
Dan Levy 35.jpg	Dan Levy	35	
David Barclay 110.jpg	David Barclay	110	Bank of Hobart
David Bowman 39.jpg	David Bowman	39	
David Braham 84.jpg	David Braham	84	Editor, Sydney Daily Telegraph
David Buddo (NZ) 54.jpg	David Buddo	54	
David Low 10.jpg	David Low	10	"The Caricaturist and his Quarry" comic sequence
David McKee Wright 87.jpg	David McKee Wright	87	Used in article 3 August 2024
David R Hall 34.jpg	David R. Hall	34	
David Souter 89.jpg	David Henry Souter	89	
Day Hort Bosanquet 17.jpg	Day Hort Bosanquet	17	
Denison Miller 98.jpg	Denison Miller	98	
Dick Meagher 32.jpg	Dick Meagher	32	
Dicky Nevill 103.jpg	Richard "Dicky" Nevill	103	ADC to Australia's first G-G
Digby Denham 39.jpg	Digby Denham	39	
Dryblower Murphy 90.jpg	Dryblower Murphy	90	Used in article 3 August 2024
E B Docker 69.jpg	E. B. Docker	69	
E D Millen 25.jpg	E. D. Millen	25	
E E Cleland 74.jpg	E. E. Cleland	74	
E F Mitchell 72.jpg	E. F. Mitchell	72	Used in article 4 August 2024
E H Macartney 42.jpg	E. H. Macartney	42	
E T Fricker 85.jpg	E. T. Fricker	85	Used in article 4 August 2024
E T Smith 106.jpg	E. T. Smith	106	
Edmund Barton, Samuel Griffith, R E O'Connor 66.jpg	Edmund Barton	66	group portrait
Edmund Barton, Samuel Griffith, R E O'Connor 66.jpg	Samuel Griffith	66	group portrait
Edmund Barton, Samuel Griffith, R E O'Connor 66.jpg	R. E. O'Connor	66	group portrait
Edward Cunningham 84.jpg	Edward S. Cunningham	84	
Edward J Russell 26.jpg	Edward J. Russell	26	
Edward Mercer 63.jpg	Edward Mercer	63	Used in article 4 August 2024
Edward Mulcahy 51.jpg	Edward Mulcahy	51	
Elliott Lewis 51.jpg	Elliott Lewis	51	
Elwood Mead 97.jpg	Elwood Mead	97	American irrigation expert
F R Chapman (NZ) 78.jpg	F. R. Chapman	78	
F S Wallis 48.jpg	F. S. Wallis	48	
F W Coneybeer 48.jpg	F. W. Coneybeer	48	
F W Ward 84.jpg	F. W. Ward	84	Used in article 4 August 2024
Frank Madden 38.jpg	Frank Madden	38	
Frank Morton 90.jpg	Frank Morton	90	Used in article 4 August 2024
Frank Tate 97.jpg	Frank Tate	97	Used in article 4 August 2024
Fred Flowers 35.jpg	Fred Flowers	35	
Fred T Whitington 63.jpg	Fred T. Whitington	63	Used in article August 2024
G A Elmslie 37.jpg	G. A. Elmslie	37	
G F Pearce 25.jpg	G. F. Pearce	25	
G H Knibbs 97.jpg	G. H. Knibbs	97	
G H Wise 26.jpg	G. H. Wise	26	
G J R Murray 74.jpg	G. J. R. Murray	74	
G M Prendergast 37.jpg	G. M. Prendergast	37	
G P Fitzgerald 109.jpg	G. P. Fitzgerald	109	Used in article 4 August 2024
G S Beeby 36.jpg	G. S. Beeby	36	
G W Russell (NZ) 55.jpg	G. W. Russell	55	
G W Smith 96.jpg	G. W. Smith	96	Used in article 4 August 2024
George Dancey 89.jpg	George Dancey	89	
George Downer 106.jpg	George Downer	106	Used in article 4 August 2024
George Fowlds (NZ) 54.jpg	George Fowlds	54	
George Graham 36.jpg	George Graham	36	Used in article 4 August 2024
George H Reid 29.jpg	George H. Reid	29	
George King-Hall 92.jpg	George King-Hall	92	
George Laurenson (NZ) 54.jpg	George Laurenson	54	
George Maxwell 70.jpg	George Maxwell	70	Used in article 4 August 2024
George Patey 92.jpg	George Patey	92	
George Thomas Clarke 95.jpg	George Thomas Clarke	95	
Gerald Strickland 16.jpg	Gerald Strickland	16	
Gottlieb Schuler 85.jpg	Gottlieb Schuler	85	Used in article 4 August 2024
Gregor McGregor 25.jpg	Gregor McGregor	25	
H E Starke 72.jpg	H. E. Starke	72	
H F Hardacre 43.jpg	H. F. Hardacre	43	
H J M Payne 51.jpg	H. J. M. Payne	51	
H W Bishop (NZ) 80.jpg	H. W. Bishop	80	New Zealand magistrate
Harry Barron 15.jpg	Harry Barron	15	
Harry D Morton 34.jpg	Harry D. Morton	34	
Harry Diddams 94.jpg	Harry Diddams	94	
Harry J Weston 90.jpg	Harry J. Weston	90	
Harry Julius and Ure Smith 88.jpg	Harry Julius	88	group portrait
Harry Julius and Ure Smith 88.jpg	Sydney Ure Smith	88	group portrait
Harry Turley 27.jpg	Harry Turley	27	
Henry Hodges and Joseph Hood 72.jpg	Henry Hodges	72	group portrait
Henry Hodges and Joseph Hood 72.jpg	Joseph Henry Hood	72	group portrait
Henry Jones 109.jpg	Henry Jones	109	Used in article 4 August 2024
Henry Lawson 83.jpg	Henry Lawson	83	
Henry Short 85.jpg	Henry Short	85	
Henry Willis 34.jpg	Henry Willis	34	
Herbert Nicholls 76.jpg	Herbert Nicholls	76	Used in article 4 August 2024
Hermann Homburg 46.jpg	Hermann Homburg	46	
Hugh D McIntosh 100.jpg	Hugh D. McIntosh	100	
Hugh J Ward 101.jpg	Hugh J. Ward	101	
Hugh McKenzie 38.jpg	Hugh McKenzie	38	Used in article 4 August 2024
Hugh McCrae 89.jpg	Hugh McCrae	89	
J A Arthur 70.jpg	J. A. Arthur	70	
J E Davidson 85.jpg	J. E. Davidson	85	Used in article 4 August 2024
J F Archibald 83.jpg	J. F. Archibald	83	
J G Appel 40.jpg	J. G. Appel	40	
J G Davies 49.jpg	J. G. Davies	49	
J H Cann 34.jpg	J. H. Cann	34	
J H Coyne 40.jpg	J. H. Coyne	40	
J H M Abbott 89.jpg	J. H. M. Abbott	89	Used in article 4 August 2024
J H Vaughan 46.jpg	J. H. Vaughan	46	
J L Nanson 45.jpg	J. L. Nanson	45	
J Le Gay Brereton 87.jpg	J. Le Gay Brereton	87	
J R M Robertson 102.jpg	J. R. M. Robertson	102	medical doctor and mining engineer
J W Evans 50.jpg	J. W. Evans	50	
J W Sutherland 108.jpg	J. W. Sutherland	108	Used in article 4 August 2024
Jack Earle 50.jpg	Jack Earle	50	
James Allen (NZ) 53.jpg	James Allen	53	
James Belton 50.jpg	James Belton	50	Used in article 4 August 2024
James Carroll (NZ) 54.jpg	James Carroll	54	
James Colvin (NZ) 54.jpg	James Colvin	54	
James Duhig 64.jpg	James Duhig	64	
James Edmond 83.jpg	James Edmond	83	Used in article 4 August 2024
James Fenton 24.jpg	James Fenton	24	
James Gardiner 26.jpg	James Gardiner	26	
James H Catts 24.jpg	James H. Catts	24	
James Tolmie 39.jpg	James Tolmie	39	
James W Blair 42.jpg	James W. Blair	42	
Jens A Jensen 24.jpg	Jens A. Jensen	24	
Jim Page, Austin Chapman 26.jpg	Jim Page	26	group portrait
John A Millar (NZ) 56.jpg	John A. Millar	56	
John Charles Wright 58.jpg	John Charles Wright	58	Used in article 4 August 2024
John Estell 36.jpg	John Estell	36	
John Forrest 23.jpg	John Forrest	23	
John George Bice 48.jpg	John George Bice	48	
John G. Findlay (NZ) 80.jpg	John G. Findlay	80	
John J. Grimes (NZ) 64.jpg	John J. Grimes	64	
John Harper 96.jpg	John Harper	96	Used in article 4 August 2024
John Lane Mullins 99.jpg	John Lane Mullins	99	
John Lemmon 38.jpg	John Lemmon	38	
John Madden 71.jpg	John Madden	71	
John McMaster 94.jpg	John McMaster	94	
John Meagher 36.jpg	John Meagher	36	Used in article 4 August 2024
John Robert Sinclair 110.jpg	John Robert Sinclair	110	Used in article 15 August 2024
John S Dodds 76.jpg	John S. Dodds	76	Used in article 4 August 2024
John Scaddan 45.jpg	John Scaddan	45	
John Spence 99.jpg	John Spence	99	lawn bowls
John T Short 96.jpg	John T. Short	96	
John Verran 47.jpg	John Verran	47	
John W Downer 74.jpg	John W. Downer	74	
Joseph Cook 20.jpg	Joseph Cook	20	
Joseph Maria Gordon 93.jpg	Joseph Maria Gordon	93	
Joseph Ward (NZ) 52.jpg	Joseph Ward	52	
Joshua Williams (NZ) 78.jpg	Joshua Williams	78	
Josiah Symon 74.jpg	Josiah Symon	74	
Josiah Thomas 34.jpg	Josiah Thomas	34	
Jupp Gardiner 44.jpg	Jupp Gardiner	44	
Justice Sim (NZ) 78.jpg	William Sim	78	
Justice Stringer (NZ) 78.jpg	Walter Stringer	78	
Justices Isaacs and Higgins 67.jpg	Isaac Isaacs	67	group portrait
Justices Isaacs and Higgins 67.jpg	H. B. Higgins	67	group portrait
Justices Sly, Pring, Street, Gordon 69.jpg	R. M. Sly	69	group portrait
Justices Sly, Pring, Street, Gordon 69.jpg	Robert Pring	69	group portrait Used in article 4 August 2024
Justices Sly, Pring, Street, Gordon 69.jpg	Philip Street	69	group portrait
Justices Sly, Pring, Street, Gordon 69.jpg	Alexander Gordon	69	group portrait
King O'Malley 27.jpg	King O'Malley	27	
Kodak O'Ferrall 88.jpg	Kodak O'Ferrall	88	
L E Groom 27.jpg	L. E. Groom	27	
L O Lukin 75.jpg	L. O. Lukin	75	Used in article 4 August 2024
Langdon Bonython 86.jpg	Langdon Bonython	86	
Langer Owen 70.jpg	Langer Owen	70	Used in article 4 August 2024
Larry O'Loughlin 48.jpg	Larry O'Loughlin	48	
Lavington Bonython 94.jpg	Lavington Bonython	94	
Leonard Isitt (NZ) 55.jpg	Leonard Isitt	55	
Lionel Lindsay 88.jpg	Lionel Lindsay	88	
Lord Chelmsford 16.jpg	Lord Chelmsford	16	
Lord Denman 14.jpg	Lord Denman	14	
Lord Islington (NZ) 18.jpg	Lord Islington	18	
Lord Liverpool (NZ) 18.jpg	Lord Liverpool	18	
Lord Plunket (NZ) 18.jpg	Lord Plunket	18	
Louis Stone 88.jpg	Louis Stone	88	Used in article 4 August 2024
Lowther Clarke 59.jpg	Lowther Clarke	59	
M S Love 102.jpg	M. S. Love	102	Used in article 4 August 2024
Massy-Greene 27.jpg	Walter Massy-Greene	27	
Maurice Watteeuw 102.jpg	Maurice Watteeuw	102	Belgian consul
Michael Kelly (60).jpg	Michael Kelly	60	
Monty Grover 84.jpg	Monty Grover	84	
Nathan Spielvogel 90.jpg	Nathan Spielvogel	90	
Norman Lindsay 82.jpg	Norman Lindsay	82	
Nutter Thomas 63.jpg	Nutter Thomas	63	
O B P Seppelt 106.jpg	O. B. P. Seppelt	106	
Paris Nesbit 74.jpg	Paris Nesbit	74	
Pat Real 75.jpg	Pat Real	75	Used in article 4 August 2024
Peter McBride 104.jpg	Peter McBride	104	Used in article 4 August 2024
Philip Collier 44.jpg	Philip Collier	44	
Pope Cooper 75.jpg	Pope Cooper	75	
R B Burnside 77.jpg	R. B. Burnside	77	Used in article 4 August 2024
R F McMillan 77.jpg	R. F. McMillan	77	Used in article 4 August 2024
R H Rhodes (NZ) 55.jpg	Heaton Rhodes	55	
Ramsay Smith 105.jpg	Ramsay Smith	105	
Randolph Bedford 90.jpg	Randolph Bedford	90	
Richard Arthur 36.jpg	Richard Arthur	36	Used in article 4 August 2024
Richard G Casey 103.jpg	Richard G. Casey	103	
Richard Hamilton 108.jpg	Richard Hamilton	108	Used in article 4 August 2024
Richard Septimus Haynes 76.jpg	Richard Septimus Haynes	76	
Alderman Richards 95.jpg	Richard Watkins Richards	95	
Robert B Nicholson 108.jpg	Robert B. Nicholson	108	Used in article 4 August 2024
Robert Garran 97.jpg	Robert Garran	97	
Robert Stout (NZ) 79.jpg	Robert Stout	79	
Robert T Paton 98.jpg	Robert T. Paton	98	Used in article 4 August 2024
Rod Quinn 90.jpg	Rod Quinn	90	Used in article 3 August 2024
Roderick McKenzie (NZ) 55.jpg	Roderick McKenzie	55	
Ronald Munro-Ferguson 15.jpg	Ronald Munro-Ferguson	15	
Sam Copley 107.jpg	Sam Copley	107	Used in article 4 August 2024
Samuel Way 72.jpg	Samuel Way	72	
Sir George Clifford 110.jpg	Sir George Clifford	16	NZ horse racing official
Sir John Fuller 16.jpg	Sir John Fuller	16	
Snowy Baker 100.jpg	Snowy Baker	100	
Sol Green 104.jpg	Sol Green	104	Used in article 4 August 2024
St Clair Donaldson 62.jpg	St Clair Donaldson	62	
Steele Rudd 88.jpg	Steele Rudd	88	
Stephen Henry Parker 77.jpg	Stephen Henry Parker	77	
T A Dibbs 98.jpg	T. A. Dibbs	98	
T H Davey (NZ) 55.jpg	T. H. Davey	55	
T J Thompson 99.jpg	T. J. Thompson	99	lawn bowler for Strathfield
T W Heney 84.jpg	T. W. Heney	84	Used in article 4 August 2024
Tas Wilson 109.jpg	Tasman Wilson	109	Medical doctor, Launceston, Wentworth Falls
Ted Dyson 90.jpg	Ted Dyson	90	
Tetley Gant 49.jpg	Tetley Gant	49	Used in article 4 August 2024
Thomas Anderson Stuart 96.jpg	Thomas Anderson Stuart	96	
Thomas Davey 95.jpg	Thomas Davey	95	Used in article 4 August 2024
Thomas J Carr 60.jpg	Thomas J. Carr	60	
Thomas Mackenzie (NZ) 56.jpg	Thomas Mackenzie	56	
Thomas Molloy 94.jpg	Thomas Molloy	94	
Thomas Taylor (NZ) 54.jpg	Thomas Taylor	54	
Thomas Wilford (NZ) 80.jpg	Thomas Wilford	80	
Thomas Young Duncan (NZ) 55.jpg	Thomas Young Duncan	55	
Tom Pascoe 48.jpg	Tom Pascoe	48	
Tommy Walker 45.jpg	Tommy Walker	45	
W A Holman 32.jpg	W. A. Holman	32	
W C Angwin 44.jpg	W. C. Angwin	44	Used in article 4 August 2024
W C Grahame 38.jpg	W. C. Grahame	38	Used in article 4 August 2024
W D Armstrong 43.jpg	W. D. Armstrong	43	
W D Johnson 44.jpg	W. D. Johnson	44	
W Ellison-Macartney 15.jpg	W. Ellison-Macartney	15	
W F Massey 53.jpg	W. F. Massey	53	
W G Ashford 35.jpg	W. G. Ashford	35	
W G Riddell (NZ) 80.jpg	W. G. Riddell	80	Used in article 4 August 2024
W H Barnes 43.jpg	W. H. Barnes	43	
W H Burgess 110.jpg	W. H. Burgess	110	Warden, Port of Hobart
W H Herries (NZ) 53.jpg	W. H. Herries	53	
W H Simmonds 85.jpg	W. H. Simmonds	85	
W J Denny 46.jpg	W. J. Denny	46	
W J Steward (NZ) 56.jpg	W. J. Steward	56	
W M Williams 109.jpg	W. M. Williams	109	
W O Archibald 26.jpg	W. O. Archibald	26	
W S Murphy 42.jpg	W. S. Murphy	42	Used in article 4 August 2024
W T Paget 43.jpg	W. T. Paget	43	
W V Ralston 105.jpg	W. V. Ralston	105	Used in article 4 August 2024
Wallace Nelson 108.jpg	Wallace Nelson	108	
Walter Bentley 100.jpg	Walter Bentley	100	
Walter James 77.jpg	Walter James	77	
Walter Jardine 88.jpg	Walter Jardine	88	Used in article 4 August 2024
William A Watt 27.jpg	William A. Watt	27	
William Creswell 92.jpg	William Creswell	92	
William Cullen 68.jpg	William Cullen	68	
William G Cahill 105.jpg	William G. Cahill	105	
William H Kelly 23.jpg	William H. Kelly	23	
William Herbert Wood 53.jpg	William Herbert Wood	53	
William Kidston 41.jpg	William Kidston	41	
William Lennon 39.jpg	William Lennon	39	
William Loton 107.jpg	William Loton	107	
William MacGregor 17.jpg	William MacGregor	17	
William Macleod and 'Hop' Hopkins 99.jpg	William Macleod	99	group portrait Used in article 4 August 2024
William Macleod and 'Hop' Hopkins 99.jpg	Hop Hopkins	99	group portrait
William Schutt 72.jpg	William Schutt	72	Vic. Supreme Court judge
Winthrop Hackett 86.jpg	Winthrop Hackett	86	

== See also ==
- The Lorgnette Australian show business magazine — includes thumb portraits of entertainers
- John Henry Chinner another cartoonist — includes thumbnail caricatures of notable South Australians
- Table Talk (magazine) — includes thumbnail caricatures of notable Victorians of the 1920s – 1930s
