= Trial of Dylann Roof =

2016 murder trial in South Carolina, United States

United States v. Roof
- Court: United States District Court for the District of South Carolina
- Full case name: United States of America v. Dylann Storm Roof
- Decided: December 15, 2016
- Verdict: Found guilty on all 33 federal charges
- Defendant: Dylann Storm Roof
- Defense: David Bruck
- Citation: F. Supp. 3d 419

Case history
- Subsequent actions: State of South Carolina v. Dylann Roof (April 2017); United States v. Roof, 10 F.4th 314 (4th Cir. 2021); Dylann Roof was sentenced to death by the federal government on January 10, 2017

Court membership
- Judge sitting: Richard Gergel

United States v. Roof F. Supp. 3d 419(D.S.C. 2016) (officially the United States of America v. Dylann Storm Roof) was a 2017 federal trial involving mass murderer Dylann Roof and his role in the Charleston church shooting in 2015. Five days after the shooting, Roof was indicted on 33 federal charges, including 12 counts of committing a hate crime against black victims. On May 24, 2016, the Justice Department announced that Roof would face the death penalty. As he was already facing the death penalty in his state trial, Roof became the first person in U.S. history to face both a federal and state death penalty at the same time.

On December 15, 2016, the jury found Roof guilty on all 33 federal counts he had been charged with. He was sentenced to death on January 10, 2017.

Roof later pleaded guilty to the state charges in order to avoid another death sentence, and was sentenced to nine consecutive life imprisonments without parole.

== Federal trial ==
=== Indictment ===
Five days after the shooting, Attorney General Loretta Lynch announced a grand jury had indicted Roof on 33 federal charges: 12 counts of committing a hate crime against black victims, 12 counts of obstructing the exercise of religion and nine counts of using a firearm to commit murder.

On July 31, 2015, Roof pleaded not guilty to the federal charges against him at the behest of his lawyer David Bruck. Roof wanted to plead guilty, but Bruck stated he was not willing to advise a guilty plea until the government indicated whether it wanted to seek the death penalty, as 18 of the 33 charges could carry the death penalty.

On May 24, 2016, the Justice Department announced they would seek the death penalty for Roof. As he was already facing the death penalty in his South Carolina state trial, Dylann Roof became the first person in U.S. history to face both a federal and state death penalty at the same time.

=== Pre-trial proceedings ===
On June 9, 2016, Roof, through his lawyers, announced that he did not want to be tried by a jury. If the request was granted, the judge presiding over his case would hear the case entirely by himself, determining guilt or innocence and, if Roof is convicted, whether to sentence him to death.

On August 2, 2016, Roof's lawyers filed a motion arguing that the federal capital punishment laws were unconstitutional. Federal prosecutors filed a response on August 22, asking the judge to reject the motion.

On August 23, 2016, federal prosecutors filed court documents announcing their intention to call thirteen expert witnesses at trial, including white supremacy experts who were expected to testify on Roof's "extremist ideology, including a belief in the need to use violence to achieve white supremacy." The documents also indicated the presence of extensive incriminating evidence against Roof. A hearing was set for September 1, 2016.

Around August 31, 2016, District Judge Richard Gergel ordered that an in camera hearing be held on September 1. The judge was to rule on the admissibility of some "potentially explosive" evidence. Gergel wrote: "This instance is one of those rare cases where Defendant's Sixth Amendment right to a fair trial outweighs the public's and the press' First Amendment right of access. ... This is an unusually sensitive period in this proceeding where highly prejudicial publicity could taint the jury pool and make selection of a fair and impartial jury increasingly challenging." Two Charleston-area media outlets, The Charleston Post and Courier and WCBD-TV, unsuccessfully sought to keep the hearing open.

On September 6, 2016, federal prosecutors filed a motion seeking to bar Roof's attorneys from asking the jurors for their client's mercy during sentencing should he be found guilty of the charges against him. They argue that the defense will already have the opportunity to present evidence that could sway the jury's opinion for sentencing. The next day, prosecutors asked for the use of summary charts as evidence for the trial. One of the charts was expected to be a timeline of the case as drafted by the agent responsible for investigating the shooting.

Jury selection started on September 26, 2016. The initial pool of three thousand candidates was narrowed down to the final jury of twelve, plus alternates. The federal trial itself was expected to start late November or early December and last for about two months.

On November 8, 2016, District Court judge Richard M. Gergel ordered a competency evaluation for Roof, which Gergel scheduled for November 16, 2016. Gergel also postponed the jury selection to November 21, 2016.

On November 14, 2016, Gergel delayed the competency hearing to November 17, 2016. However, on November 16, 2016, Gergel delayed the competency hearing to November 21, 2016. Gergel also delayed the jury selection to November 28, 2016. The competency hearing ended November 22, 2016.

On November 25, 2016, Roof was declared competent to stand trial. Three days later, a federal judge granted Roof's motion for pro se representation.

On December 4, 2016, Roof, in a handwritten request, asked Gergel to give him back his defense team for the guilt phase of his federal death penalty trial. On December 5, 2016, Gergel allowed Roof to hire back his lawyers for the guilt phase of his trial. On December 6, 2016, a federal judge denied a motion by Roof's defense team to delay Roof's trial.

=== Trial and sentencing ===
Roof's federal trial began on December 7, 2016. On the first day, while a survivor was giving her testimony of what happened during the shooting, Roof's mother collapsed in court and suffered a heart attack. Three days into the trial, a video recording of Roof talking to FBI agents shortly after the shooting was played in court, in which Roof laughed as he admitted that he had killed the people at the church. He also admitted that he had "[drunk] a little" just before visiting the church. On December 15, 2016, after about two hours of deliberation, the jury found Roof guilty on all 33 counts.

At a court hearing on December 28, 2016, Roof reiterated that he will proceed with the sentencing phase without attorneys, although Judge Gergel repeatedly warned him that it was not in his interests to do so. At the hearing Roof said that he did not plan to call any witnesses or present any evidence at the sentencing phase in order to avoid the death penalty.

On January 3, 2017, following a lengthy closed-door competency hearing, Judge Gergel denied a motion, submitted under seal by Roof's court-appointed counsel, that sought to have Roof declared incompetent. Gergel wrote: "After fully considering all of the evidence presented, the court ruled from the bench that Defendant remains competent to stand trial and to self-represent."

On sentencing day, the jury unanimously recommended the death penalty and Roof was sentenced to death by lethal injection on January 10, 2017.

=== Appeal ===
On May 25, 2021, Roof filed an appeal to the United States Court of Appeals for the Fourth Circuit United States v. Roof, 10 F.4th 314 (4th Cir. 2021) based on his competency to stand trial, his self representation, alleged errors in the penalty phase of the trial, and alleged errors in the guilt phase of the trial. The appeal was heard on August 25, 2021, where the court affirmed the judgement.

== State charges ==
On June 19, Roof was charged with nine counts of murder and one count of possession of a firearm during the commission of a violent crime. He first appeared in Charleston County court by video conference at a bond hearing later that day. At the hearing, shooting survivors and relatives of five of the victims spoke to Roof directly, saying that they were "praying for his soul" and forgave him. Governor Nikki Haley had called for prosecutors to seek the death penalty for Roof.

The judge, Charleston County chief magistrate James "Skip" Gosnell Jr., caused controversy at the bond hearing with his statement that, alongside the dead victims and their families, "there are victims on this young man's side of the family […] Nobody would have ever thrown them into the whirlwind of events that they are being thrown into." Gosnell then set a $1 million bond for the weapons possession charge and no bail on the nine counts of murder.

On July 7, Roof was indicted on three new charges of attempted murder, one for each person who survived the shooting. A temporary gag order was issued by a judge on July 14 following the appearance of a letter purportedly written by Roof on an online auction site. Seven groups, including news media outlets, families of the slain victims, and church officials, called for easing some restrictions placed by the gag order, particularly 9-1-1 calls. Portions of the gag order were lifted on October 14, allowing for the release of 9-1-1 call transcripts and other documents, but the order remained in place for graphic crime scene photos and videos, as well as audio for the 9-1-1 calls.

On July 16, Roof's trial in state court was scheduled by Circuit Court Judge J.C. Nicholson to start on July 11, 2016. On July 20, Roof was ordered to provide handwriting samples to investigators. The order explained that following his arrest in Shelby, notes and lists were found written on his hand and at other locations; that the handwriting samples were needed to determine if the handwriting matched.

On September 3, Ninth Circuit solicitor (district attorney) Scarlett Wilson said that she intended to seek the death penalty for Roof because more than two people were killed in the shooting and others' lives were put at risk.

On September 16, Roof said through his attorney that he was willing to plead guilty to the state charges in exchange for a sentence of life in prison without parole.

Roof reappeared in state court on October 23, 2015, before Nicholson.

The jury selection process for the state trial was initially expected to start in June 2016; jury selection was postponed in November 2016.

In April 2016, the state trial was delayed to January 17, 2017. It was delayed again in January 2017.

On April 10, 2017, Roof pleaded guilty to nine state counts of murder, and was sentenced to nine consecutive sentences of life without parole. In a letter to the victims' families, Wilson said that the plea deal was "an insurance policy" in the event that Roof's federal death sentence were ever overturned, as it assures that Roof will die in prison.
