= Francis Nicholls =

Francis Nicholls may refer to:

- Frankie Knuckles (1955–2014), American DJ and record producer
- Francis T. Nicholls (1834–1912), two-term governor of Louisiana
- Francis Nicholls (artist) (1966–2020), New Zealand painter

== See also ==
- Francis D. Nichol (1897–1966), Seventh-day Adventist
- Francis Nicolls (disambiguation), including Francis Nichols
- Francis Nicholson (disambiguation)
