= Chris Nicholson =

Chris or Christopher Nicholson may refer to:

- Chris Nicholson (athlete) (born 1967), New Zealand Olympian, competing in cycling and speed skating
- Chris Nicholson (magician), close up magician
- Chris Nicholson (sailor) (born 1969), Australian Olympic yachtsman
- Chris Nicholson (judge) (born 1945), South African cricketer and jurist
- Christopher Nicholson (1904-1948), British architect
