= The Political Thought of Tarique Rahman =

- Editors: Saleh Shibly; Ashik Islam; Mahdi Amin; Humaiun Kobir
- Language: English
- Published: 26 June 2013 (Bangladesh Policy Forum Cambridge)
- Publication place: United Kingdom
- Media type: Paperback
- Pages: 174

The Political Thought of Tarique Rahman: Empowerment of the Grassroots People is a book published by Bangladesh Policy Forum Cambridge, a non-profit policy organization based in Cambridge.

The book is a collection of seventeen articles written on the politics and thoughts of Tarique Rahman, the Senior Vice Chairman of Bangladesh's Bangladesh Nationalist Party, which had governed the country four times since independence. Authors of the articles, including four editors of the book, are Bangladeshi and English academics, journalists and politicians who have either the experience of working closely with Tarique Rahman or have come to familiarize with his activities through their own works.

The book was officially launched in June 2013 at the University of Cambridge. In August 2013, the American edition was published at Columbia University in New York City, followed by the Australian, Canadian and German editions which were respectively inaugurated at the University of New South Wales, University of Toronto and University of Ulm between September and October 2013.

== Contents ==
The seventeen articles take place as individual chapters in the book.

1. As I See the Policies of Tarique Rahman by David Nicholson
2. The Legacy of Tarique Rahman's Family by Muhammad Jamiruddin Sircar
3. As I See Tarique Rahman by Moudud Ahmed
4. The Philosophy of Tarique Rahman by Mushfiqur Rahman
5. The Future Leader of Bangladesh by Shaukat Mahmood
6. The Endeared Leader of the People by M Maniruzzaman Miah
7. A Leader Subjected to Inhuman Tortures by Anwarullah Chowdhury
8. Bangladesh in the 21st Century: Tarique Rahman as the Saviour by Khandaker Mustahidur Rahman
9. Safe Return: Save Bangladesh by Syed Rashidul Hasan
10. Tarique Rahman: A Statesmanlike Leadership by Abdul Latif Masum
11. A Cruel Victim of the ‘Goebbelsian Theory’ by Sahabul Huq
12. Propaganda Never Prevails by Abdul Hye Sikder
13. How I See Tarique Rahman as a Leader by James Smith
14. The Bottom-Up Approach of Tarique Rahman: The Formula of Development by Saleh Shibly
15. The Vanguard of the Nationalist Movement in Bangladesh by Humaiun Kobir
16. How a Political Moderniser Rebuilds the Face of Bangladesh by Mahdi Amin
17. The Road to Go by Ashik Islam

== Publication ==
- Cambridge, Bangladesh Policy Forum Cambridge [2013]
