= Judge Nicholson =

Judge Nicholson may refer to:

- Chris Nicholson (judge) (born 1945), South African High Court judge
- Colin Nicholson (1936–2015), judge of the High Court of New Zealand
- J. C. Nicholson (born 1942), judge of the South Carolina Circuit Court
- Odas Nicholson (1924–2012), judge of the Law Division of the Circuit Court of Cook County, Illinois

== See also ==
- Justice Nicholson (disambiguation)
