= Francis Nicolls =

Francis Nicolls (or Nichols) may refer to:

- Francis Nicolls (MP for Bishop's Castle, Shropshire) (c.1582–1624), father of Richard Nicolls
- Sir Francis Nicolls, 1st Baronet (1586–1642), MP for Northamptonshire

== See also ==
- Francis Nicholls (disambiguation)
- Francis Nicholson (disambiguation)
- Frank Nicholls (1699–1778), English physician
