= Edward Nicholson =

Edward Nicholson may refer to:

- Edward Max Nicholson (1904–2003), founder of World Wildlife Fund
- Edward Nicholson (librarian) (1849–1912), British author and Bodley's Librarian
- Ed Nicholson (1923–1987), Canadian ice hockey player

== See also ==
- Edward Nicolson (born 1964), English cricketer
