= Peter Nicholson =

Peter Nicholson may refer to:

- Peter Nicholson (architect) (1765–1844), British architect, mathematician and engineer
- Peter Nicholson (cartoonist) (born 1946), Australian cartoonist, caricaturist and sculptor
- Peter M. Nicholson (1919–1986), former political figure in Nova Scotia, Canada
- Peter John Nicholson (born 1942), former political figure in Nova Scotia, Canada

== See also ==
- Peter White (Australian politician, born 1936) (Peter Nicholson Duckett White, 1936–2005)
- Peter Nichols (disambiguation)
- Peter Nicholls (disambiguation)
