= A Song for Jenny =

2015 television film by Brian Percival

- Based on: A Song for Jenny by Julie Nicholson
- Screenplay by: Frank McGuinness
- Directed by: Brian Percival
- Starring: Emily Watson
- Country of origin: United Kingdom
- Original language: English

Production
- Executive producer: Stephen Wright
- Producer: Liz Trubridge
- Cinematography: David Katznelson
- Editor: John Wilson
- Running time: 77 minutes
- Production company: BBC Northern Ireland Drama Productions

Original release
- Network: BBC One
- Release: 5 July 2015

A Song for Jenny is a 2015 British television film directed by Brian Percival and starring Emily Watson as Julie Nicholson, whose daughter Jenny was murdered in the 7 July 2005 London bombings. It is based on Nicholson's book of the same name.

== Cast ==
- Emily Watson as Julie Nicholson
- Nicola Wren as Jenny
- Steven Mackintosh as Greg
- Martha Mackintosh as Lizzie
- Laurence Belcher as Thomas
- Alan Rothwell as Uncle Jimmie
- Gwilym Lee as James
- Anne Stallybrass as Mother
- John Woodvine as Father
- Sophie Dix as Sharon
- Noah Jupe as William
- Poppy Miller as Vanda
- Stuart Martin as Colin
- Maxine Evans as Pauline
- Bruce Byron as Taxi Driver
- Andrew Whipp as DCI
