= Robert Nicholson =

Robert Nicholson may refer to:

- Robert Nicholson (baritone), Australian singer
- Robert Nicholson (Indian Army officer) (1745–1821), British military officer in Bombay
- Robert Nicholson (judge), Australian jurist
- Robert Nicholson (piper) (1798–1842), Northumbrian piper
- Robert B. Nicholson (1863–1917), businessman in Kalgoorlie, Western Australia
- Rob Nicholson (musician) (born 1969), also known as "Blasko", American rock music performer
- Rob Nicholson (politician) (born 1952), Canadian member of parliament
- Bobby Nicholson (1918–1993), American musician and actor

== See also ==
- Bob Nicholson (disambiguation)
