= Peter Nicholls =

Peter Nicholls may refer to:

- Peter Nicholls (artist) (1936–2021), New Zealand sculptor
- Peter Nicholls (writer) (1939–2018), Australian literary scholar and critic
- Peter Nicholls (musician) (born 1959), British musician
- (Peter) Francis Nicholls (artist) (1966–2020), New Zealand painter

== See also ==
- Peter Nichols (disambiguation)
