= Samuel Nicholson (disambiguation) =

Samuel Nicholson (1743–1811) was an officer in the Continental Navy and the United States Navy.

Samuel Nicholson may also refer to:

- Samuel Nicholson (merchant) (1738–1827), English wholesale haberdasher and banker
- Samuel Caldwell Nicholson (died 1891), British trade unionist
- Samuel D. Nicholson (1859–1923), United States Senator from Colorado
- Sam Nicholson (born 1995), Scottish footballer

== See also ==
- Nicholson (name)
