= Dylann Roof =

American mass murderer (born 1994)

- Mug shot of Roof, 2015
- Born: Dylann Storm Roof; April 3, 1994 (age 32); Columbia, South Carolina, U.S.
- Occupations: Unemployed, former landscaper
- Known for: Perpetrator of the Charleston church shooting
- Status: Incarcerated
- Motive: White supremacy/nationalism; Accelerationist neo-Nazism; Desire to start a race war; Anti-black racism; Belief in the white genocide conspiracy theory
- Convictions: 36 counts (Note: Federal Hate crimes resulting in death (18 U.S.C. § 249) (9 counts) Hate crimes involving an intent to kill (18 U.S.C. § 249) (3 counts) Obstruction of religious exercise resulting in death (18 U.S.C. § 247) (9 counts) Obstruction of religious exercise involving an intent to kill using a weapon (18 U.S.C. § 247) (3 counts) Use of a firearm during a crime of violence resulting in death (18 U.S.C. § 924) (9 counts) State Murder (9 counts) Attempted murder (3 counts) Possession of a weapon during the commission of a violent crime)
- Penalty: Federal; Death; State; 9 consecutive life sentences without the possibility of parole plus 95 years

Details
- Date: June 17, 2015 c. 9:05 p.m. – c. 9:11 p.m.
- Locations: Charleston, South Carolina, U.S.
- Target: African-American churchgoers
- Killed: 9
- Injured: 1
- Weapon: .45-caliber Glock 41 handgun
- Date apprehended: June 18, 2015
- Imprisoned at: USP Terre Haute

Dylann Storm Roof (born April 3, 1994) is an American mass murderer, white supremacist, and neo-Nazi who perpetrated the Charleston church shooting. During a Bible study on June 17, 2015, at Emanuel African Methodist Episcopal Church in Charleston, South Carolina, Roof murdered nine people and injured a tenth; the victims were African Americans, and included Clementa C. Pinckney, who was the church's senior pastor and a state senator. After several people identified Roof as the main suspect, he became the center of a manhunt that ended the morning after the shooting with his arrest in Shelby, North Carolina. He later confessed that he committed the shooting in hopes of igniting a race war. Roof's actions in Charleston have been widely described as domestic terrorism.

Three days after the shooting, a website titled The Last Rhodesian was discovered and later confirmed by officials to be owned by Roof. The website contained photos of Roof posing with symbols of white supremacy and neo-Nazism, along with a picture of him wearing a jacket containing the flags of Apartheid-era South Africa and Rhodesia, and a manifesto in which he outlined his views toward Black people, among other groups. He also claimed in the manifesto to have developed his white supremacist views after reading about the 2012 killing of Trayvon Martin and black-on-white crime.

On December 15, 2016, Roof was convicted in federal court of all 33 federal charges (including hate crimes) against him stemming from the shooting; on January 11, 2017, he was sentenced to death for those crimes. On March 31, 2017, Roof agreed to plead guilty in South Carolina state court to all state charges pending against him—nine counts of murder, three counts of attempted murder, and possession of a firearm during the commission of a felony—to avoid a second death sentence. In return, he accepted a sentence of life in prison without parole. On April 10, 2017, Roof was sentenced to nine consecutive sentences of life without parole after formally pleading guilty to state murder charges. He is currently awaiting execution for the federal convictions on death row at USP Terre Haute.

== Early life ==
Roof was born in Columbia, South Carolina, to Franklin Bennett Roof (nicknamed Benn), a carpenter and a construction contractor, and Amelia "Amy" Cowles, a bartender. His parents had divorced but were temporarily reconciled at the time of his birth. In November 1999, when Roof was five, his father married Paige Mann (née Hastings); they divorced after 10 years of marriage. Bennett Roof was verbally and physically abusive toward Mann. The family mostly lived in South Carolina, though from about 2005 to 2008, they temporarily moved to the Florida Keys. There is no information about Roof attending local schools there.

According to a 2009 affidavit filed for Mann's divorce, Roof exhibited "obsessive compulsive behavior" as he grew up, obsessing over germs and insisting on having his hair cut in a certain style. When he was in middle school, he started smoking marijuana.

In nine years, Roof attended at least seven schools in two South Carolina counties, including Dreher High School in Columbia, and White Knoll High School in Lexington, in which he repeated the ninth grade, finishing it in another school. He stopped attending classes in 2010 and, according to his family, dropped out of school and spent his time alternating between playing video games and taking drugs. He claimed in his interrogation to have received his GED after dropping out of online schooling. He was on the rolls of a local Lutheran congregation, but it was unclear if he had recently attended.

Prior to the attack, Roof was living alternately in Bennett's and Cowles' homes in downtown Columbia and Hopkins, respectively, but was mostly raised by his stepmother. For several weeks preceding the attack, Roof had also been occasionally living in the home of an old friend from middle school and the latter's mother, two brothers, and girlfriend. He allegedly spent his time using drugs and getting drunk. He had been working as a landscaper at the behest of his father, but quit the job prior to the shooting.

His maternal uncle, Carson Cowles, said that he expressed concern about the social withdrawal of his then-19-year-old nephew, because "he still didn't have a job, a driver's license or anything like that and he just stayed in his room a lot of the time." Cowles said he tried to mentor Roof, but Roof rejected his attempts to help and they drifted apart. According to his stepmother Mann, Roof cut off all contact with her after her divorce from his father. When his sister planned to be married, he did not respond to her invitation to the event.

A former high school classmate said that despite Roof's racist comments, some of his friends in school were African-American.

=== Earlier contacts with police ===
Roof had a prior police record consisting of two arrests, both made in the months preceding the attack. He was investigated on one occasion during this period but without arrest or charge.

On February 28, 2015, mall security at the Columbiana Centre in Columbia called police after Roof, wearing all-black clothing, asked employees unsettling questions. During police questioning, Roof consented to be searched, and was found to be in possession of several strips of buprenorphine/naloxone, a prescription medication for opioid use disorder which is sometimes sold illegally, but usually for therapeutic rather than recreational use. As Roof did not have a valid prescription, he was arrested for a misdemeanor charge of drug possession, and was subsequently banned from the Columbiana Centre for a year.

On March 13, 2015, Roof was investigated for loitering in his parked car near a park in downtown Columbia. He had been recognized by an off-duty police officer who investigated his March 2 questioning; the officer then called a colleague to investigate. A police officer conducted a search of his vehicle and found a forearm grip for an AR-15 semiautomatic rifle and six unloaded magazines, all capable of holding 40 rounds. When asked about it, Roof informed the officer that he wanted to purchase an AR-15, but did not have enough money to do so. He was not charged, as it was not illegal in South Carolina to possess a forearm grip.

On April 26, 2015, Roof was arrested again for trespassing on the Columbiana Centre mall's grounds in violation of the ban. The ban was then extended for three additional years.

According to James Comey, speaking in July 2015, Roof's February arrest was at first written as a felony, which would have required an inquiry into the charge during a firearms background examination. It was legally a misdemeanor charge and was incorrectly written as a felony at first due to a data entry error made by a jail clerk. Comey said that Roof could potentially have been prohibited from buying firearms under a law that barred "unlawful user[s] of or addicted to any controlled substance" from owning firearms, although UCLA Law Professor Eugene Volokh wrote that it is unclear whether Roof's misdemeanor possession charge would have meant he met that definition.

== Charleston church shooting ==
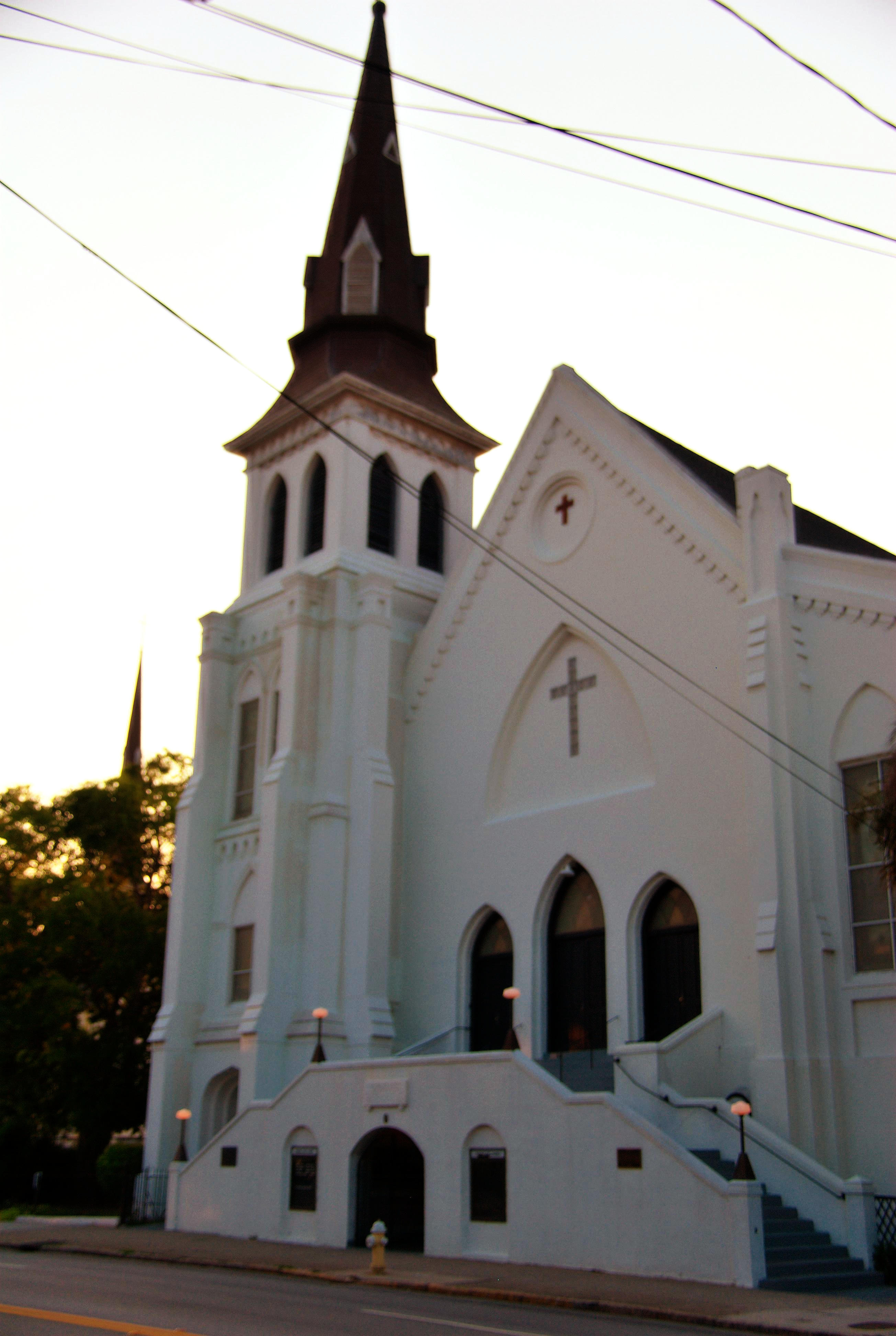
Emanuel African Methodist Episcopal Church

On the evening of June 17, 2015, a mass shooting took place at Emanuel African Methodist Episcopal Church in downtown Charleston, South Carolina. During a routine Bible study at the church, a white man about 21 years old, later identified as Roof, opened fire with a handgun, firing more than 50 rounds, and ultimately killing nine people. Roof was unemployed and living in largely African-American Eastover at the time of the attack.

=== Motivation ===
According to a childhood friend, Roof went on a rant about the killing of Trayvon Martin and the 2015 Baltimore protests that were sparked by the death of Freddie Gray while Gray was in police custody. He also often claimed that "Blacks were taking over the world". Roof reportedly told friends and neighbors of his plans to kill people, including a plot to attack the College of Charleston, but his claims were not taken seriously.

One image from his Facebook page showed him wearing a jacket decorated with two obsolete flags used as emblems among American white supremacist movements, those of Rhodesia (present-day Zimbabwe) and apartheid-era South Africa. Another online photo showed Roof sitting on the hood of his car with an ornamental license plate with a Confederate flag on it. According to his roommate, Roof expressed his support for racial segregation in the United States and had wanted to start a civil war.

One of the friends who briefly hid Roof's gun away from him said, "I don't think the church was his primary target because he told us he was going for the school. But I think he couldn't get into the school because of the security ... so I think he just settled for the church." An African-American friend of his said that he never witnessed Roof expressing any racial prejudice, but also said that a week before the shooting, Roof had confided in him that he would commit a shooting at the college.

On the day he was captured (June 18, 2015), Roof confessed to committing the Charleston attack with the intention of starting a race war, and reportedly told investigators he almost did not go through with the shooting because members of the church study group had been so nice to him.

Federal prosecutors said in August 2016 that Roof was "self-radicalized" online, instead of adopting his white supremacist ideology "through his personal associations or experiences with white supremacist groups or individuals or others".

==== Website and handwritten documents ====
On June 20, 2015, a website that had been registered to a Dylann Roof on February 9, 2015, lastrhodesian.com, was discovered. Though the identity of the domain's owner was intentionally masked the day after it was registered, law enforcement officials confirmed Roof as the owner. The site included a cache of photos of Roof posing with a handgun and a Confederate Battle Flag, as well as with the widely recognized neo-Nazi code numbers 88 (an abbreviation for the salute "Heil Hitler!") and 1488, written in sand. Roof was also seen spitting on and burning an American flag. While some photographs seemed to show Roof at home in his room, others were taken on an apparent tour of slavery-related historical sites in North and South Carolina, including Sullivan's Island, the largest slave disembarkation port in North America, four former plantations, two cemeteries (one for white Confederate soldiers, the other for slaves), and the Museum and Library of Confederate History in Greenville. Roof is believed to have taken self-portraits using a timer, and staff members working at the sites did not remember his visits.

The website also contained an unsigned, 2,444-word manifesto apparently authored by Roof, in which he outlined his opinions, all methodically broken into the following sections: "Blacks", "Jews", "Hispanics", "East Asians", "Patriotism", and "An Explanation":

I have no choice. I am not in the position to, alone, go into the ghetto and fight. I chose Charleston because it is [the] most historic city in my state, and at one time had the highest ratio of blacks to Whites in the country. We have no skinheads, no real KKK, no one doing anything but talking on the internet. Well someone has to have the bravery to take it to the real world, and I guess that has to be me.

The manifesto states that its author was "truly awakened" by coverage of the killing of Trayvon Martin:

I read the Wikipedia article and right away I was unable to understand what the big deal was. It was obvious that Zimmerman was in the right. But more importantly this prompted me to type in the words "black on white crime" into Google, and I have never been the same since that day. The first website I came to was the Council of Conservative Citizens. There were pages upon pages of these brutal black on white murders. I was in disbelief. At this moment I realized that something was very wrong. How could the news be blowing up the Trayvon Martin case while hundreds of these black on white murders got ignored?

The manifesto also mentioned the Northwest Front, a Seattle-based white supremacist organization.

According to web server logs, Roof's website was last modified at 4:44 p.m. on June 17, 2015, when Roof noted, "[A]t the time of [this] writing I am in a great hurry."

According to court documents filed in August 2016, Roof drafted two other manifestos, one in 2015 and the other in jail, recovered from his vehicle and jail cell, respectively. He also made a list of churches and a "selection of victims", along with other writings.

=== Weapon purchase and FBI lapse ===
Roof purchased the gun used in the shooting from a retail gun store in West Columbia, using money given to him on his birthday. The Washington Post reported on July 10, 2015, that FBI Director James Comey said that Roof "was able to purchase the gun used in the attack only because of lapses in the FBI's background-check system". On August 30, 2019, the Fourth Circuit Court of Appeals ruled that the survivors and families of the deceased could sue the federal government, after a lower court had previously claimed the federal government had immunity. On October 28, 2021, Charleston attorney Carl Pierce, whose firm represented Rev. Daniel Simmons, confirmed that the federal government would pay $88 million. Also on that day, individual settlements were being filed in the U.S. District Court in Columbia. The U.S. Justice Department approved the settlement but did not admit guilt.

One week prior to the shooting, two of his friends tried to hide the gun after Roof claimed he was going to kill people. They returned it to him after the girlfriend of one of the friends, in whose trailer they hid the gun, pointed out that her boyfriend was on probation and needed to have the gun out of his possession.

=== Prior to the shooting ===
FBI analysis of Roof's seized cellphone and computer found that he was in online communication with other white supremacists, according to unnamed officials. Although Roof's contacts did not appear to have encouraged the massacre, the investigation was said to have widened to also include other persons of interest.

=== Reaction by white supremacists ===
Although the Council of Conservative Citizens took down its website on June 20 in the immediate wake of negative publicity, its president, Earl Holt, stated that the organization was "hardly responsible" for Roof's actions. The organization also issued a statement saying that Roof had some "legitimate grievances" against Black people and that the group's website "accurately and honestly report[s] black-on-white violent crime". Harold Covington, the founder of the Northwest Front, also condemned Roof's actions, but called the attack "a preview of coming attractions".

Through analysis of his manifesto, the Southern Poverty Law Center alleged that Roof was a reader and commenter on The Daily Stormer, a neo-Nazi website. Its editor, Andrew Anglin, "repudiated Roof's crime and publicly disavowed violence, while endorsing many of Roof's views." He said that while he would have sympathy with a white man shooting criminals, killing innocents including elderly women was "a completely insane act".

A neo-Nazi group named itself the "Bowl Patrol" after Roof's "bowl-cut" hairstyle. The group remained active as of a July 2020 exposé in the Huffington Post, five years after the Charleston church shooting.

Brenton Tarrant, who committed the Christchurch mosque shootings in New Zealand, highlighted Roof as an influence in his manifesto. Three years later, the perpetrator of the 2022 Buffalo shooting, Payton Gendron, also referred to Roof in his manifesto as an inspiration and wrote Roof's name on one of his guns.

== Manhunt and capture ==
The attack was treated as a hate crime by police, and officials from the Federal Bureau of Investigation (FBI) were called in to assist in the investigation and manhunt.

At 10:44 a.m., on the morning after the attack, Roof was captured in a traffic stop in Shelby, North Carolina, approximately 245 miles (394 km) from the shooting scene. A .45-caliber pistol was found in the car during the arrest, though it was not immediately apparent if it was the same one used in the attack.

Police received a tip-off from a driver, Debbie Dills, from Gastonia, North Carolina. She recognized Roof driving his car, a black Hyundai Elantra with South Carolina license plates and a three-flag "Confederate States of America" bumper decoration, on U.S. Route 74, recalling security camera images taken at the church and distributed to the media. She later recalled: "I got closer and saw that haircut. I was nervous. I had the worst feeling. Is that him or not him?" She called her employer, who contacted local police, and then tailed the suspect's car for 35 miles (56 km) until she was certain authorities were moving in for an arrest. His older half-sister also reported him to the police after seeing his photo on the news.

Roof was arrested and was interrogated by agents of the FBI. He stated that he was planning to travel to Nashville, Tennessee when he was arrested in Shelby. Roof initially did not believe his interrogators when they informed him that the death toll of his attack was nine people, believing that the number of casualties was lower, saying he felt "bad" after learning the true number. When asked if he believed that his actions would start a revolution, implying that it would start a race war, he dismissed the idea as delusional. An unidentified source said interrogations with Roof after his arrest determined he had been planning the attack for around six months, researched Emanuel AME Church, and targeted it because of its role in African American history.

== Trial and conviction ==
On the evening of June 18, 2015, Roof waived his extradition rights and was flown to Sheriff Al Cannon Detention Center in North Charleston. At the jail, his cell-block neighbor was Michael Slager, the former North Charleston officer charged with first-degree murder in the wake of his shooting of Walter Scott.

Roof is the first person in U.S. history to have faced the death penalty on both state and federal charges at the same time. In September 2015, it was announced that prosecutors would seek the death penalty in Roof's state prosecution, and in May 2016, the U.S. Department of Justice announced that prosecutors would seek the death penalty in his federal prosecution as well.

=== State prosecution ===
On June 19, 2015, Roof was charged with nine counts of murder and one count of possession of a firearm during the commission of a violent crime. He first appeared in Charleston County court by video conference at a bond hearing later that day. At the hearing, shooting survivors and relatives of five of the victims spoke to Roof directly, saying that they were "praying for his soul" and forgave him. Governor Nikki Haley called for prosecutors to seek the death penalty for Roof.

The judge, Charleston County chief magistrate James "Skip" Gosnell Jr., caused controversy at the bond hearing with his statement that, alongside the dead victims and their families, "there are victims on this young man's side of the family ... Nobody would have ever thrown them into the whirlwind of events that they are being thrown into." Gosnell then set a $1 million bond for the weapons possession charge and no bail on the nine counts of murder.

On July 7, 2015, Roof was indicted on three new charges of attempted murder, one for each person who survived the shooting. A temporary gag order was issued by a judge on July 14 following the appearance of a letter purportedly written by Roof on an online auction site. Seven groups, including news media outlets, families of the slain victims, and church officials, called for easing some restrictions placed by the gag order, particularly 9-1-1 calls. Portions of the gag order were lifted on October 14, allowing for the release of 9-1-1 call transcripts and other documents, but the order remained in place for graphic crime scene photos and videos, as well as audio for the 9-1-1 calls.

On July 16, 2015, Roof's trial in state court was scheduled by Circuit Court Judge J. C. Nicholson to start on July 11, 2016. On July 20, Roof was ordered to provide handwriting samples to investigators. The order explained that following his arrest in Shelby, notes and lists were found written on his hand and at other locations; that the handwriting samples were needed to determine if the handwriting matched.

On September 3, Ninth Circuit solicitor (district attorney) Scarlett Wilson said that she intended to seek the death penalty for Roof because more than two people were killed in the shooting and others' lives were put at risk. On September 16, Roof said through his attorney that he was willing to plead guilty to the state charges to avoid being sentenced to death. Roof reappeared in state court on October 23, 2015, before Nicholson.

The jury selection process for the state trial was initially expected to start in June 2016; jury selection was postponed in November 2016. In April 2016, the state trial was delayed to January 17, 2017. It was delayed again in January 2017. On April 10, 2017, Roof pleaded guilty to nine state counts of murder and was sentenced to nine consecutive sentences of life without parole. In a letter to the victims' families, Wilson said that the plea deal was "an insurance policy" in the event that Roof's federal death sentence were ever overturned, as it assures that Roof will die in prison.

=== Federal prosecution ===
==== Indictment ====
Five days after the shooting, Attorney General Loretta Lynch announced a grand jury had indicted Roof on 33 federal charges: nine counts of using a firearm to commit murder and 24 civil rights violations (12 hate crime charges under the Matthew Shepard and James Byrd Jr. Hate Crimes Prevention Act and 12 counts under a second hate-crime statute that prohibits using force or threatening the use of force to obstruct a person's free exercise of religious beliefs), with 18 of the charges carrying the federal death penalty.

On July 31, 2015, Roof pleaded not guilty to the federal charges against him at the behest of his lawyer David Bruck. Roof wanted to plead guilty, but Bruck stated he was not willing to advise a guilty plea until the government indicated whether it wanted to seek the death penalty, as 18 of the 33 charges could carry the death penalty.

On May 24, 2016, the Justice Department announced they would seek the death penalty for Roof. As he was already facing the death penalty in South Carolina, Roof became the first person in U.S. history to face the death penalty on both federal and state charges at the same time.

==== Trial preparations ====
On June 9, 2016, Roof, through his lawyers, announced that he did not want to be tried by a jury. Instead, Roof wanted the judge presiding over his case to hear the case entirely by himself, determining guilt or innocence and, if Roof was convicted, whether to sentence him to death. The judge denied that motion after the prosecution (whose consent is required for a bench trial under the rules that apply to federal criminal proceedings) opposed Roof's request.

On August 2, 2016, Roof's lawyers filed a motion arguing that the federal capital punishment laws were unconstitutional. Federal prosecutors filed a response on August 22, asking the judge to reject the motion.

On August 23, 2016, federal prosecutors filed court documents announcing their intention to call thirteen expert witnesses at trial, including white supremacy experts who were expected to testify on Roof's "extremist ideology, including a belief in the need to use violence to achieve white supremacy". The documents also indicated the presence of extensive incriminating evidence against Roof. A hearing was set for September 1, 2016.

Around August 31, 2016, District Judge Richard Gergel ordered that an in camera hearing be held on September 1. The judge was to rule on the admissibility of some "potentially explosive" evidence. Gergel wrote: "This instance is one of those rare cases where Defendant's Sixth Amendment right to a fair trial outweighs the public's and the press' First Amendment right of access. ... This is an unusually sensitive period in this proceeding where highly prejudicial publicity could taint the jury pool and make selection of a fair and impartial jury increasingly challenging." Two Charleston-area media outlets, The Charleston Post and Courier and WCBD-TV, unsuccessfully sought to keep the hearing open.

On September 6, 2016, federal prosecutors filed a motion seeking to bar Roof's attorneys from asking the jurors for mercy during sentencing should he be found guilty of the charges against him. They argue that the defense will already have the opportunity to present evidence that could sway the jury's opinion for sentencing. The next day, prosecutors asked for the use of summary charts as evidence for the trial. One of the charts was expected to be a timeline of the case as drafted by the agent responsible for investigating the shooting.

Jury selection started on September 26, 2016. The initial pool of three thousand candidates was narrowed down to the final jury of twelve, plus alternates. The federal trial itself was expected to start late November or early December and last for about two months.

On November 8, 2016, District Court judge Richard M. Gergel ordered a competency evaluation for Roof, which Gergel scheduled for November 16, 2016. Gergel also postponed the jury selection to November 21, 2016.

On November 14, 2016, Gergel delayed the competency hearing to November 17, 2016. On November 16, 2016, Gergel delayed the competency hearing to November 21, 2016. Gergel also delayed the jury selection to November 28, 2016. The competency hearing ended November 22, 2016.

On November 25, 2016, Roof was declared competent to stand trial. Three days later, a federal judge granted Roof's motion for pro se representation.

On December 4, 2016, Roof, in a handwritten request, asked Gergel to give him back his defense team for the guilt phase of his federal death penalty trial. On December 5, 2016, Gergel allowed Roof to hire back his lawyers for the guilt phase of his trial. On December 6, 2016, a federal judge denied a motion by Roof's defense team to delay Roof's trial.

==== Trial and sentencing ====
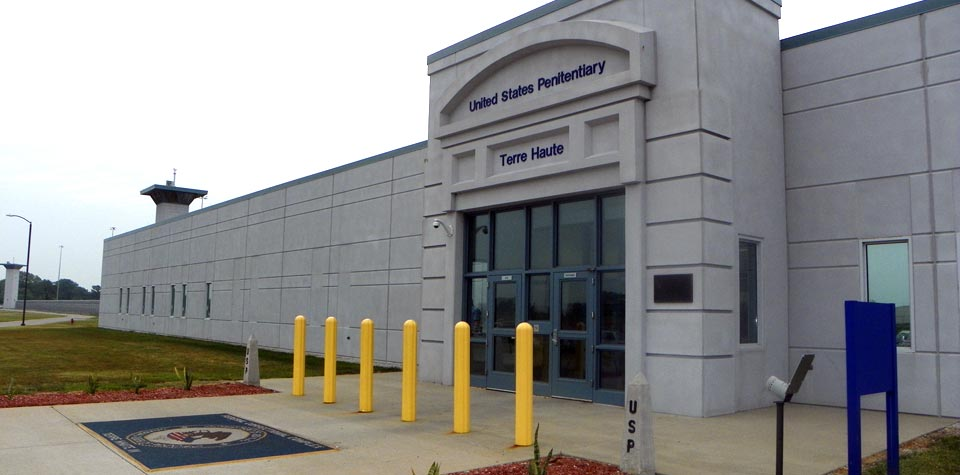
USP Terre Haute, where Roof is incarcerated

On December 7, 2016, Roof's federal trial began. The jury consisted of "two black women, eight white women, one white man and one black man". Two days into the trial, Roof's confession was played in court, admitting that he had killed the people at the church before chuckling. On December 15, 2016, after about two hours of deliberation, the jury found Roof guilty on all 33 counts.

At a court hearing on December 28, 2016, Roof reiterated that he would proceed with the sentencing phase without attorneys, although Judge Gergel repeatedly warned him that it was not in his interests to do so. At the hearing Roof said that he did not plan to call any witnesses or present any evidence at the sentencing phase in order to avoid the death penalty.

On January 3, 2017, following a lengthy closed-door competency hearing, Judge Gergel denied a motion, submitted under seal by Roof's court-appointed counsel, that sought to have Roof declared incompetent. Gergel wrote: "After fully considering all of the evidence presented, the court ruled from the bench that Defendant remains competent to stand trial and to self-represent."

On January 10, 2017, the jury recommended the death penalty for Roof, and on January 11, 2017, Judge Gergel formally sentenced Roof to death.

Until April 19, 2017, Roof was located at the Charleston County Jail; on that day federal authorities took custody of him and took him to FTC Oklahoma City. On April 22, 2017, Roof arrived at USP Terre Haute, the location of the federal death row for men and the federal execution chamber.

==== Post-trial proceedings and release of documents ====
On May 10, 2017, Judge Gergel denied Roof's motion for a new trial. On the same day, Gergel unsealed psychiatric reports from two court-ordered exams of Roof performed by James Ballenger, a forensic psychiatrist, as well as the transcripts of two competency hearings, all of which found Roof competent to stand trial. The court first ordered a psychiatric exam after Roof wrote a letter to prosecutors which referred to his defense attorneys as "the sneakiest group of people I have ever met" and adamantly rejected their strategy to portray him as mentally ill. Roof voiced his opposition to the practice of psychology, describing it as a "Jewish invention that does nothing but invent diseases and tell people they have problems when they don't."

The psychiatric report showed that Roof stated of the relatives of his victims that he "did not identify with them, he didn't care." Ballenger concluded that Roof had "perhaps some autistic traits" and meets the criteria for "social anxiety disorder, probably generalized anxiety disorder, possible autistic spectrum disorder, a mixed substance abuse disorder, depression by history and a schizoid personality disorder" but was competent to stand trial. Ballenger wrote that Roof blocked his attorneys from introducing any evidence of autism or other disorders, as well as various delusions, at trial because he did not want "any issue to take away from the rationale he had for committing his crimes" because he felt that "his reputation was ruined, ... He continues to feel that the only thing that is important to him is to protect his reputation." Roof, who denies having autism, told Ballenger that he "would rather die" than rely on autism defense, stating "it would ruin me" and "everybody would think I am a weirdo." Ballenger concluded that: "all of his decisions in the trial are dominated and driven by his primary racial prejudice and wish to preserve that as the sole rationale for his crimes and to protect his long term image and reputation as someone who has no mental illness."

==== Death sentence appeal attempt ====
In January 2020, it was reported that Roof was appealing his death sentence. According to a 321-page brief filed by Roof's lawyers in the U.S. Court of Appeals for the 4th Circuit, Roof's representing himself during the penalty phase of his trial deprived the jury of extenuating information about his mental illness. The brief cites the Supreme Court's ruling in Indiana v. Edwards that judges can force a lawyer on defendants who lack mental capacity.

On May 25, 2021, his lawyers began an appeal process before the United States Court of Appeals for the Fourth Circuit claiming that Roof was "too disconnected from reality" to represent himself at the federal trial. In the 321-page motion, his attorneys argue that he had disorders ranging from schizophrenia spectrum to autism, anxiety and depression, and that he did not care about his sentence, in the belief that white nationalists would rescue him from prison after an impending race war. Roof reportedly had decided he wanted to appeal his death sentence once he realized that the war was not going to happen and he was not going to be rescued. According to his defense team, Roof reportedly masked his mental illness during the trial because he felt it might interfere with his rescue from prison.

On August 25, 2021, a panel of the Fourth Circuit unanimously rejected Roof's appeal. Upholding the death sentence, the judges wrote in their 149-page opinion that "no cold record or careful parsing of statutes and precedents can capture the full horror of what Roof did. His crimes qualify him for the harshest penalty that a just society can impose." On September 10, 2021, his attorneys appealed the judges' ruling.

On September 24, 2021, a federal court declined to take the appeal case against the panel's decision, arguing in a one-page file that the appeals should go before the full appeals court. A day prior, attorneys for the federal government opposed appeals saying that Roof was properly convicted and sentenced saying that there is "no need to revisit" the facts for which Roof was found guilty.

On March 2, 2022, attorneys for Roof announced that they had asked the Supreme Court to resolve the dispute between them and their client over the mental illness defense. Roof had fired his attorneys to prevent them from portraying him as having a mental illness. The attorneys argued that they should have been allowed to remain on the case. On October 11, 2022, it was announced that the Supreme Court had denied the appeal without comment.

== Imprisonment ==
On August 4, 2016, Roof was beaten by a fellow inmate while detained at the Charleston County Detention Center. Roof suffered bruising to the face and body, but was not seriously injured, and was allowed to return to his cell after being examined by medical personnel. The assailant was identified as 25-year-old Dwayne Marion Stafford, who was awaiting trial on charges of first-degree assault and strong-arm robbery. Stafford was able to exit his unlocked cell, pass through a steel cell door with a narrow vertical window, and go down the stairs into the jail's protective custody unit to reach Roof. At the time of the attack, Roof was alone after two detention officers assigned to be with him left, one being on break and the other called away to do another task.

Roof and his attorney stated that they did not plan to press charges. The night after the attack, 18 months after his initial arrest, Stafford was released on over $100,000 bond.

In December 2024, when President Joe Biden announced commutations for the death sentences of 37 out of 40 federal death row inmates to life imprisonment without the possibility of parole, he excluded Roof, along with Dzhokhar Tsarnaev who committed the 2013 Boston Marathon bombing and Robert Gregory Bowers who committed the 2018 Pittsburgh synagogue shooting because of their convictions for either terrorism or hate-motivated mass murder related crimes.

== See also ==
- List of death row inmates in the United States
