= David Nicholson =

David Nicholson may refer to:

- David Nicholson (Australian politician) (1904–1997), former Speaker of the Legislative Assembly of Queensland
- David Nicholson (British politician) (born 1944), former Member of Parliament
- David Nicholson (civil servant), former Chief Executive of the National Health Service in England
- David Nicholson (horse racing) (1939–2006), British National Hunt jockey and trainer
- Dave Nicholson (1939–2023), baseball player, long-ball home run hitter
- David Nicholson (journalist) (born 1963), freelance journalist
- David Lee Nicholson (1938–1967), British Olympic rower

== See also ==
- David Nicolson (1922–1996), businessman and politician
- David Nicolson, 4th Baron Carnock (1920–2008), British peer
