= Peter Nichols =

Peter Nichols may refer to:

- Peter Nichols (author) (born 1950), American author
- Peter Nichols (playwright) (1927–2019), English playwright
- Peter Nichols (journalist) (1928–1989), English newspaper journalist and author
- Peter Nichols, pseudonym of science fiction writer John Christopher (1922–2012)

== See also ==
- Peter Nicholls (disambiguation)
- Peter Nicholson (disambiguation)
