= William Nicholson =

William, Bill, Billy, Will, or Willie Nicholson may refer to:

== Arts and entertainment ==
- William Nicholson (artist, born 1781) (1781–1844), English portrait-painter and etcher
- William Nicholson (poet) (1782–1849), Scottish poet, known as the Bard of Galloway
- William Adams Nicholson (1803–1853), English architect
- Sir William Nicholson (artist, born 1872) (1872–1949), English painter and engraver
- William Nicholson (sound engineer) (born 1937), American film sound engineer
- William Nicholson (writer) (born 1948), British screenwriter, playwright and novelist

== Military ==
- William Nicholson (U.S. Navy officer) (c. 1790–1872), U.S. Navy officer
- William Nicholson, 1st Baron Nicholson (1845–1918), British field marshal and chief of the Imperial General Staff
- William Jones Nicholson (1856–1931), U.S. Army general
- Sir William Nicholson (Royal Navy officer) (1863–1932), British admiral
- William L. Nicholson (1926–2020), U.S. Air Force general

== Politics ==
- William Nicholson (Australian politician) (1816–1865), mayor of Melbourne and premier of Victoria
- William Newzam Nicholson (1816–1899), British MP for Newark
- William Nicholson (distiller) (1824–1909), British distiller and politician
- William Graham Nicholson (1862–1942), British Liberal Unionist and later Conservative Party politician
- Will Nicholson (1900–1975), American politician in Colorado
- Billy Nicholson (politician) (born 1948), American politician and former insurance agent from Mississippi

== Religion ==
- William Nicholson (English bishop) (1591–1672), bishop of Gloucester
- William Nicholson (American bishop) (1822–1901), American bishop of the Reformed Episcopal Church
- William Nicholson (Quaker) (1826–1899), American Quaker minister and physician

== Sports ==
- Billy Nicholson (ice hockey) (1878–1947), Canadian ice hockey player and executive
- Willie Nicholson (fl. 1924–1936), Scottish footballer
- Bill Nicholson (cricketer) (1909–2001), Scottish cricketer
- Bill Nicholson (baseball) (1914–1996), American baseball player
- Bill Nicholson (footballer) (1919–2004), English football player, coach and manager

== Others ==
- William Nicholson (chemist) (1753–1815), English chemist, publisher, and inventor
- William H. Nicholson (1869–1911), first African American fireman in the New York City Fire Department
- William Nicholson (journalist) (1877–1957), New Zealand clerk, local politician, builder, journalist and editor
- Bill Nicholson (Canadian administrator), Canadian farmer and administrator

== See also ==
- William Nicolson (1655–1727), English divine and antiquary
