= A. G. Ralston =

Australian lawyer

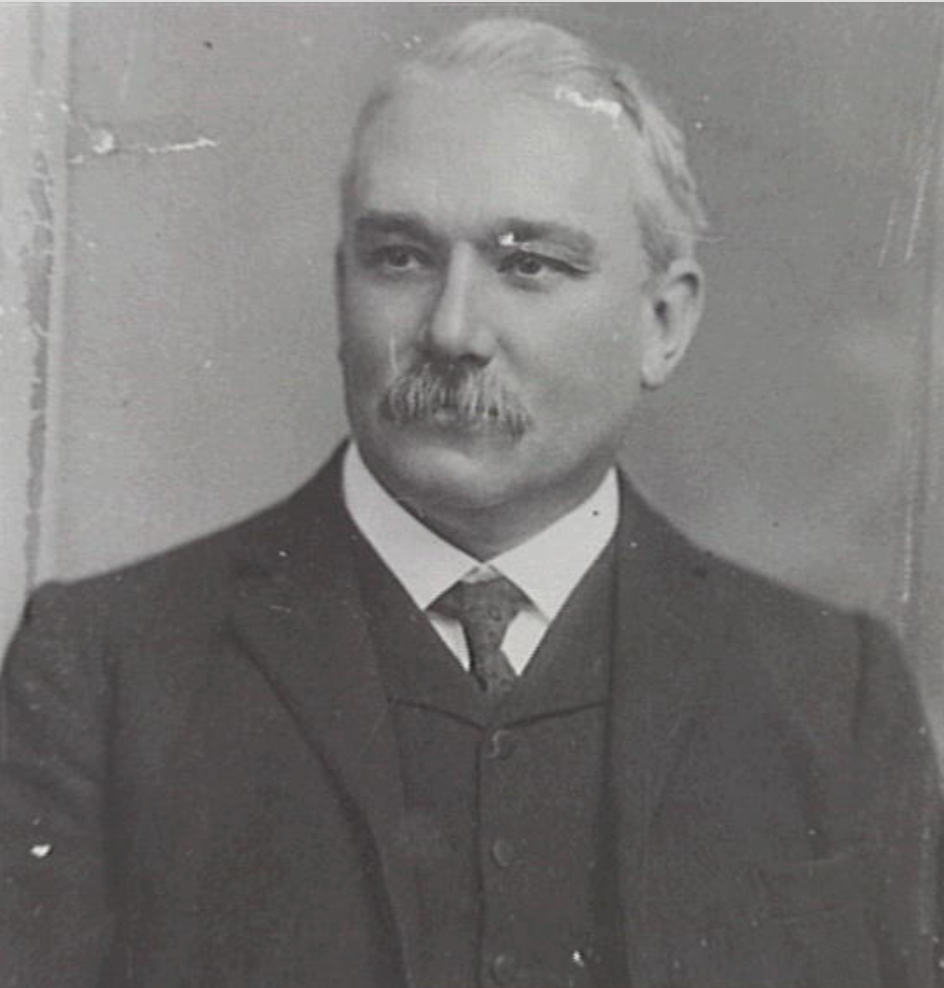
Alexander Gerard Ralston

Alexander Gerard Ralston KC (10 November 1860 – 11 July 1932) was an Australian lawyer with an extensive practice in Sydney. He was several times called on to act as judge of the New South Wales Supreme Court.

== History ==
Ralston was born in Sydney the eldest son of Alexander J. Ralston (1833–1889) and his wife Edith Windeyer Ralston, née Thompson (12 March 1834 – 13 September 1917); she was a cousin of Sir William Charles Windeyer (1834–1897) of the New South Wales Supreme Court. He was educated at Sydney Grammar School, and entered Sydney University, where he had a distinguished academic career studying Law, graduating MA. He was admitted to the Bar on 1 March 1884. In 1906 he was appointed King's Counsel, and was appointed Acting Supreme Court Judge in September 1919, in place of Justice Robert Darlow Pring (c. 1851–1922), who was conducting a Royal Commission into the wheat trade. In August 1924 he was again appointed Acting Judge for several months, assisting Justice William Owen (1834–1912) in Divorce, and also in the Common Law jurisdiction, both of which were under strain. He retired from legal practice around 1926, suffered ill-health for many years, and died at Woollahra.

== Other interests ==
Ralston was involved in municipal affairs, firstly as alderman on Ashfield Council from 1887 to 1891. Then he was an alderman on Burwood Council from 1896 to 1901 and served as mayor of Burwood from 1900 to 1901. Finally, he was elected councillor from 1900 to 1906 on the Sydney City Council, representing the Bourke Ward.

== Family ==
Ralston married his second cousin Mary Emily Windeyer (13 December 1861 – 20 July 1950) on 19 December 1884. Their children included:

- Alexander Windeyer Ralston CMG DSO VD (1885 – 29 September 1971) was a barrister and Lieutenant-Colonel in WWI
- Edward Bolton Ralston (2 September 1889 – 13 December 1967) was a Lieutenant in WWI
- Mary Elizabeth Ralston (2 October 1891 – 22 August 1926) married Dr John Andrew Leslie Wallace on 19 October 1921.
- Gavin Vardin Ralston (1901 – 27 July 1984)
