= David Bruck =

American attorney

David Isaac Bruck
- Born: 1949 (age 76–77); Montreal, Quebec, Canada
- Education: Harvard College (B.A.); University of South Carolina School of Law (J.D.)
- Occupation: Criminal Defense Attorney
- Parent(s): Gerald and Nina Bruck
- Website: Washington & Lee Faculty Profile

David Isaac Bruck (born 1949) is a Canadian-American criminal defense attorney, clinical professor of law at Washington and Lee University School of Law, and director of the Virginia Capital Case Clearinghouse. Bruck was raised in Montreal, Quebec, Canada. He attended Harvard College and University of South Carolina School of Law. He has co-represented high-profile defendants, including Ramzi bin al-Shibh, Dzhokhar Tsarnaev, Dylann Roof, and Susan Smith.

== Early life and education ==
Bruck was born and raised in Montreal, Quebec, Canada. Bruck is one of three children of Gerald, a retired textile executive, and Nina, a photographer. He attended Harvard College and was a contributor to The Harvard Crimson. Bruck earned a Bachelor of Arts magna cum laude from Harvard College in 1971. Bruck is Jewish.

After college, Bruck attended University of South Carolina School of Law. He went to law school at the University of South Carolina so that he could advise reluctant inductees at the Army's Fort Jackson. During law school, Bruck worked as a welder to pay for his schooling because he didn't want to be beholden to his family. While at the University of South Carolina, he met his friend and colleague Judy Clarke. He earned his J.D. degree cum laude in 1975.

== Legal career ==
Bruck eventually returned to South Carolina to represent clients facing the death penalty because he did not believe these defendants were receiving adequate representation. Bruck was also disturbed that the death row population consisted mostly of poor black men. One fellow law school classmates said of Bruck: "He wanted to assist people who were defenseless. Many of us felt that way in school, but David was one of the few who devoted his career to it." Bruck opposes capital punishment.

Bruck has worked as a public defender in South Carolina and in private practice. David Bruck handled many death penalty cases in South Carolina. Bruck represented Zayd Hassan Abd al-Latif Masud al-Safarini who received a life sentence for his role in the 1986 hijacking of Pan Am Flight 73 in Pakistan in which 22 people were killed.

Bruck has argued several cases before the United States Supreme Court, prevailing in six of them: Kelly v. South Carolina (2002), Shafer v. South Carolina (2001), Ramdass v. Angelone (2000), Simmons v. South Carolina (1994), Yates v. Evatt (1991), Yates v. Aiken (1988), and Skipper v. South Carolina (1986).

In 2002, Bruck began teaching at Washington & Lee University School of Law. Since 2004, he has been a clinical professor of law and director of the Virginia Capital Case Clearinghouse.

In 2014, Bruck was appointed to the defense team working with Boston Marathon bombing suspect Dzhokhar Tsarnaev. Clarke described Bruck as "one of the most experienced and well-regarded capital defense attorneys in the United States." A federal jury convicted Tsarnaev of all 30 charges against him and found him responsible for the deaths of the three people killed in the 2013 attack and the killing of an MIT police officer three days later. The same jury sentenced Tsarnaev to death. On July 31, 2020, the First Circuit overturned the death sentence and ordered a retrial for the penalty phase of Tsarnaev's trial.

Bruck was stand-by counsel for Dylann Roof, the killer of nine people in the Charleston church shooting, who represented himself in federal court. Roof was convicted by jury on all 33 counts on December 15, 2016. On January 10, 2017, after three hours of jury deliberation Dylann Roof was sentenced to death. In 2020, Bruck was chosen to represent one of the plotters of the September 11 attacks, Ramzi bin al-Shibh.

== Awards ==
- Significant Contributions to Criminal Justice Award from the California Attorneys for Criminal Justice (2001).
- John Minor Wisdom Public Service & Professionalism Award from the American Bar Association (1996).

== Scholarly articles ==
- Death Watch: Change, Redemption Do Exist, The Champion, June 27, 2003.
- A Rarefied Kind of Dread, 5 J. App. Prac. & Process 75 (2003).
- Capital Punishment in the Age of Terrorism, 41 Cath. Law. 187 (2002) (Panel Discussion with Norman L. Greene, Norman Redlich, Paul Saunders, Richard Weisberg, and Kenneth Roth).
- A Tribute to William S. Geimer, 58 Wash. & Lee L. Rev. 412 (2001).
- Keynote Address: Political and Social Misconception Fueling the Death Penalty, 13 T.M. Cooley L. Rev. 863 (1996) (Death Penalty Symposium).
- Does the Death Penalty Matter? Reflections of a Death Row Lawyer, 1 Reconstruction, No. 3 (1991), at 35 (1990 Ralph E. Shikes Lecture, Harvard Law School).
- Can You Stop Client Interrogation Behind Your Back?, S.C. Law., Nov./Dec. 1991.
- Sentencing the Mentally Retarded to Death: An Eighth Amendment Analysis, 41 Ark. L. Rev. 725 (1988) (The Mentally Retarded in the Criminal Justice System Symposium) (with John Blume).
