= William Nicholson (Quaker) =

William Nicholson (November 9, 1826 – March 1, 1899) was an American Quaker minister and physician. Born in Perquimans County, North Carolina, he was educated and taught in Quaker schools before obtaining a medical degree in 1850 and establishing a medical practice. He served as a delegate to North Carolina's constitutional convention in 1868. In 1870, he moved to Lawrence, Kansas, where he worked in Native American affairs on behalf of the Society of Friends and the federal government. He also frequently ministered, wrote on Quaker beliefs, and participated in the Kansas Yearly Meeting. He served one term in the Kansas House of Representatives in 1881. With his health in decline by the late 1880s, he moved to Pasadena, California, where he died in 1899.

== Early life ==
William Nicholson was born on November 9, 1826 in Perquimans County, North Carolina, United States. His parents, Josiah and Anne White Robinson, were elders in their local Society of Friends congregation and direct descendants of the first Quaker settlers in eastern North Carolina. He was initially educated at Friends' Academy in Belvidere before attending Friends' School in Providence, Rhode Island. He thereafter taught at the school and then at New Garden Boarding School in North Carolina. In 1850, he earned a medical degree from the University of Pennsylvania. In 1854, he married Sarah W. Newby, a widow with one son. Together they had two sons.

== Career ==
Following the obtainment of his medical degree, Nicholson practiced as a physician in Perquimans and surrounding North Carolina counties. He remained active in Quaker affairs and in 1855 became a congregation elder. During the American Civil War, he personally appealed to Confederate President Jefferson Davis to respect the desires of conscientious objectors. Following the conclusion of the conflict, Nicholson served as a delegate to the state's 1868 constitutional convention.

In 1870, the Associated Executive Committee of Friends on Indian Affairs appointed Nicholson as its general agent, and he and his family subsequently moved to Lawrence, Kansas. In that capacity he reported on Native American affairs to the committee. In 1876, Enoch Hoag, superintendent of the Central Superintendency of the Bureau of Indian Affairs, resigned, and Nicholson was appointed to replace him. The position was abolished in 1878 and Nicholson returned to service as the Friends committee's general agent. Nicholson was elected on a temperance platform to the Kansas House of Representatives in 1880, serving during its 1881 session.

During his time in Lawrence, Nicholson frequently preached and authored numerous essays on Quaker and Christian belief. In 1872, Quakers in Kansas established the Kansas Yearly Meeting and made Nicholson its clerk. He continuously held the position until 1888.

== Later life ==
Weakened by exposure to illness over the course of his career as a practicing physician, Nicholson developed lung trouble while living in Lawrence. In 1888, he and his family relocated to Pasadena, California. With his membership not officially transferred from the Kansas Yearly Meeting to the California Yearly Meeting until 1893, in 1892 the Kansas organization elected him as a delegate to the annual Quaker conference in Indianapolis. Nicholson traveled to both Kansas and Indiana to execute this role, but grew weakened by the activities by the time he returned home. His health continued to decline over subsequent years, as did that of his wife, leaving him increasingly confined to his home. He attended one California Yearly Meeting.

Bedridden in his final months, Nicholson died on March 1, 1899 at his home in Pasadena. A funeral was held two days later and he was buried in a local cemetery.

== Works cited ==
- Cheney, John L. Jr., ed. (1981). North Carolina Government, 1585-1979: A Narrative and Statistical History (revised ed.). Raleigh: North Carolina Secretary of State. OCLC 1290270510.
- Kelsey, Raney Wickersham (1917). Friends and the Indians, 1655-1917. Philadelphia: Associated Executive Committee of Friends on Indian Affairs.
