= Arthur Feez =

Australian barrister (1860–1935)

Arthur Herman Henry Milford Feez (4 March 1860 – 1935) was a lawyer in Brisbane, Australia.

== History ==
Feez by David Low

Feez was born in Rockhampton, Queensland, a son of Bavarian immigrant Colonel Albrecht Feez (1826–1905) who opened a store on Quay Street in 1859. The business prospered and Albrecht became an influential citizen, elected mayor in 1879 and MLA in 1880. His wife, Sophia Feez, née Milford, belonged to a notable family, her father being Justice Samuel Milford and a close relation of Sir William Follett. He was also able to have young Arthur educated at King's School, Parramatta, and Sydney University, from which he graduated BA in 1881.

Feez became a successful barrister, with a practice in Brisbane. He was appointed KC in November 1909.

On 12 June 1889 he married Fanny Lloyd Hart (died 20 April 1929) of Greylands, Indooroopilly, the eldest daughter of Graham L. Hart of a well-known Brisbane family. They had one daughter. Around 1924 they left for Leura in the Blue Mountains, then a year later retired to Rose Bay, Sydney.

He died in England, where he had gone on holiday around 1932.

His brother Adolphe Feez was also a successful lawyer.
