= Harry J. Weston =

Australian artist (1874–1955)

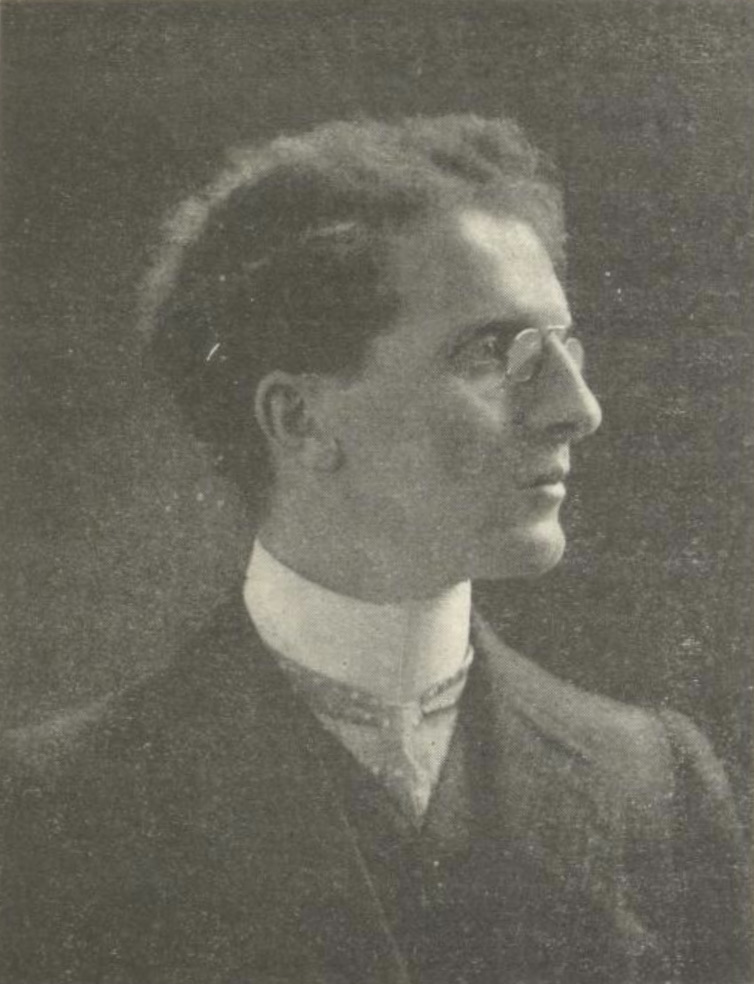
Harry J. Weston in 1907

Harry J. Weston (1874 – 13 October 1955) was an Australian painter noted for posters and magazine covers. He founded a correspondence school for learning to draw.

== Biography ==
Weston was born Henry John Weston in Hobart, Tasmania to Henry Weston and his wife Agnes Weston.

He grew up in Launceston and may have trained as an architect.

From around 1895 to 1898 he was employed as artist for The Examiner.

He moved to Melbourne around 1900.

He moved to Sydney around 1905

In 1917 he started the "Harry J. Weston School of Postal Drawing", a correspondence course, which was still operating in 1938.

In 1945 he endorsed one of The Examiner's publications.

His remains were ashed at the Northern Suburbs Crematorium.

== Works ==
He produced several posters during The Great War (1914–1918), including Were You There Then? and We Took the Hill, Come and Help Us Keep It!. He painted a large number of watercolors, including many beach and harbour scenes.

He was a founding member of the Society of Australian Black and White Artists or Australian Society of Black and White Artists, and supplied the cover for the first issue of their magazine.

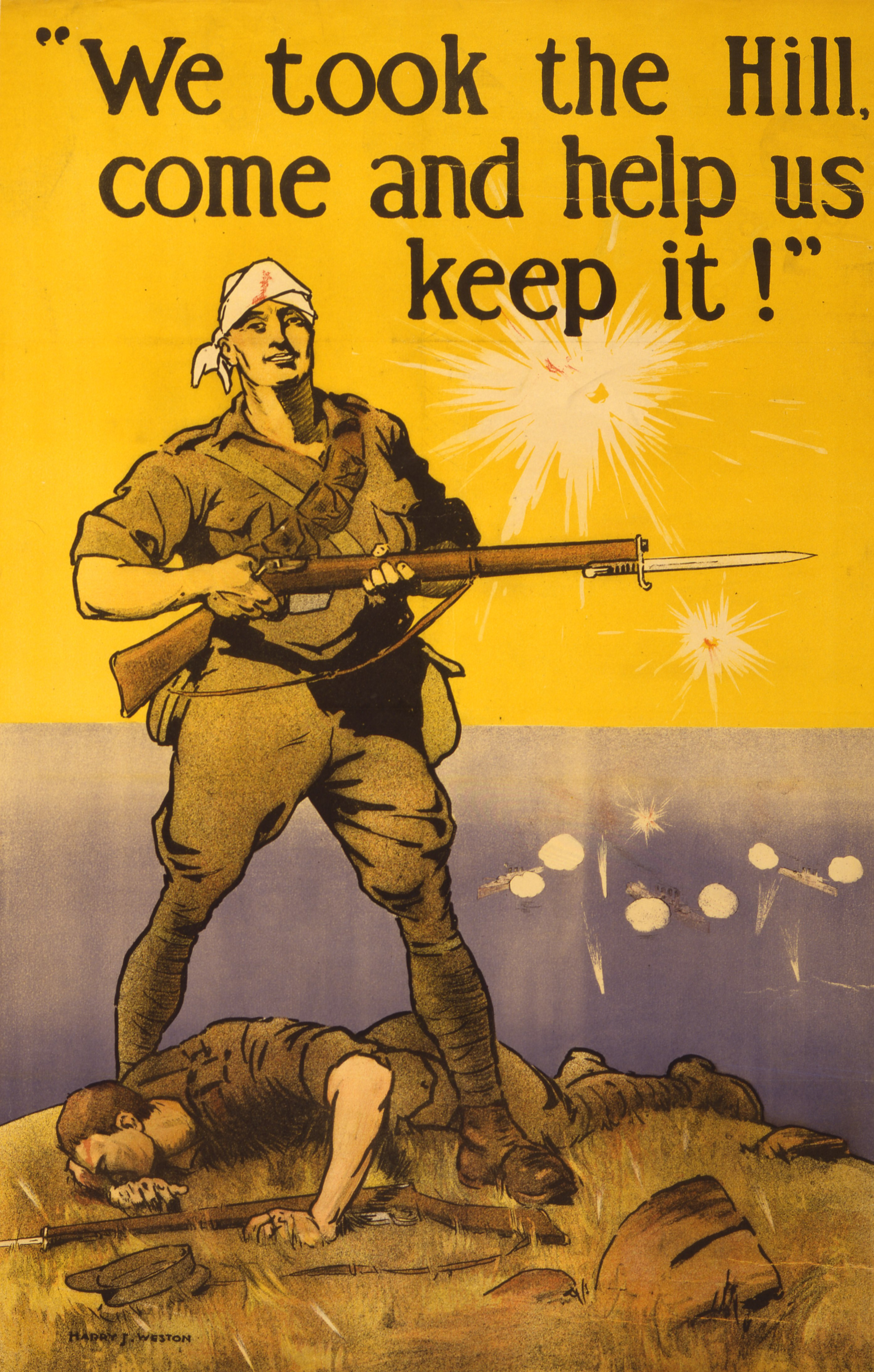

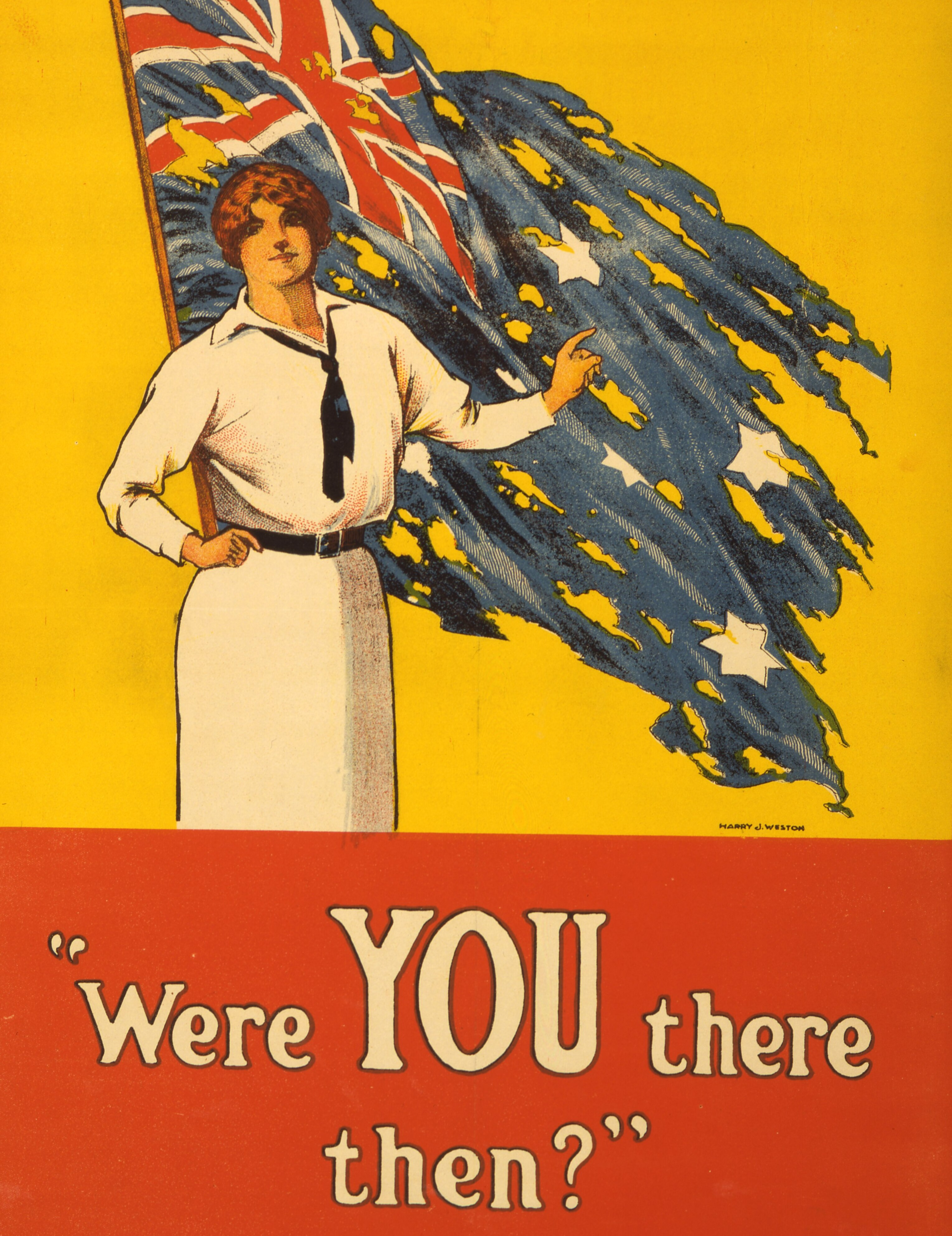

== Family ==
Weston married Maude Byrne of Wynyard, Tasmania at Wynyard on 20 May 1901.
