= Alexandre Chayet =

Alexandre Chayet (1862– ), commonly referred to as M. (Note: for "Monsieur") Chayet, was Consul-General for France in Australia from 1911 to 1918. He was an active president of the Alliance française de Sydney. His collection of historical photographs is held by the National Library of Australia.

== History ==
Chayet by David Low

Chayet was born in Navarre and following studies at the School of Political Science and the School of Law in Paris, was in 1887 appointed Attaché to the Ministry of Foreign Affairs. His overseas service began in 1890 as Consul in Madagascar, followed by similar appointments in Smyrna, Helsinki, Shieflis, Düsseldorf, Stuttgart, and Montreal.

He was appointed Chevalier of the Légion d'honneur.

M. and Mme Chayet arrived at Sydney by the SS Polynesian in November 1911.

Between 1913 and 1916 he founded in turn the Société des conférences en langues étrangères, the Institut de conversation Française and the French Music Society, functions previously performed by the Alliance Française.

The Alliance, which existed from 1896 as little more than a lending library in the French Consulate, was formally founded in 1899 by Biard d'Aunet, the consul-general from 1893 to 1905. Albert Pinard, his successor as consul general (1905–1909), had little involvement with the Alliance, its successive presidents being Louis Nettement and Dr Émile Rougier. During this period the Alliance became more democratic, admitting both women and British Australians. A period of decline, which began around 1909 ended with the election of Pierre Durieux.

The Alliance was evicted from the Consulate and took a room in Mlle Boggio’s "Modern School of Languages" in Moore Street, Sydney (later became Martin Place), and again little more than a lending library.

Chayet and his wife returned to France in 1913 for six months' leave of absence. He returned alone in 1914.

He was recalled in 1918 and next served at the French Legation at Guatemala.

His collection of 52 historical Australian photographs, many taken by Frank Hurley, was purchased by the National Library of Australia from Jean Chayet, a descendant, and named "Alexandre Chayet collection".
