= Frank Nicholson =

Frank Nicholson may refer to:

- Frank Nicholson (cricketer) (1909–1982), South African cricketer
- Frank Nicholson (rugby union) (1878–?), rugby union player who represented Australia
- Frank Nicholson (business), former managing director
- Frank Nicholson (baseball) (1889–1972), Major League Baseball pitcher

== See also ==
- Francis Nicholson (disambiguation)
