= A. M. Hertzberg =

Australian businessman (1852 – 1917)

Adolphus Marcus Hertzberg (11 June 1852 – 11 December 1917) was a businessman in Brisbane, Queensland, Australia.

== History ==
Hertzberg by David Low

Hertzberg emigrated from Prussia to Australia at age 14 or 16, and remained in Queensland the rest of his life, in Roma for twenty years, and was naturalised as a British citizen in 1871. He was twice elected mayor of the town. He was employed by R. Lewin and Co., B. R. Lewin being an uncle, and after five years was made a partner in the firm.

He moved to Brisbane and with his brother Abraham Hertzberg founded A. M. Hertzberg and Co.

== Other interests ==
- He was a Government-appointed member of the Brisbane General Hospital committee
- He was a member of the Water Board and its successor, the Metropolitan Water and Sewerage Board from 1905 to 1916
- Hertzberg was appointed to he original Senate of the University of Queensland
- He was a member of the Queensland Rhodes Scholar selection committee
- He was an active member of the Queensland Chamber of Commerce, and its president 1903–1905 and 1909–1910. *He was an active Freemason and succeeded Lord Chelmsford as grand master of the Queensland constitution.

== Family ==
In 1883 Hertzberg married a daughter of Samuel Cohen, of Ulmarra, Clarence River and sister of J. J. Cohen in the New South Wales Administration. They had three children:

- Mrs. Roland Jacobs, of Adelaide
- Marcus Hertzberg, a Brisbane barrister
- Ralph Hertzberg

His last home was "Minmorah", New Farm, Queensland
