= Bob Nicholson =

Bob Nicholson may refer to:

- Bob Nicholson (ice hockey) (born 1953), Canadian ice hockey player and administrator
- Bob Nicholson (rugby league) (died after 1950), English rugby league player
- Bob Nicholson (sports executive) (born 1955), Canadian football and baseball administrator
- Bobby Nicholson 1918–1993, American musician and actor

== See also ==
- Bob Nicholas (born 1957), American politician
- Robert Nicholson (disambiguation)
