= Julie Nicholson =

British author

- Born: 1953 (age 72–73)
- Occupation: Former vicar
- Known for: A Song for Jenny
- Religion: Christianity
- Church: Church of England
- Congregations served: Parish of St Aidan with St George, Bristol

Julie Nicholson (born 1953) is a British author and the mother of the late Jenny Nicholson, who was killed in the 7 July 2005 London bombings.

== Jenny Nicholson ==
Jennifer "Jenny" Nicholson was a 24-year-old musician who was killed in a suicide attack by Mohammad Sidique Khan in the 7 July 2005 London bombings. She was commuting from Reading to central London when the attack happened on the eastbound Circle line at Edgware Road station. Her train had been diverted from its usual route due to a mechanical problem. Shortly before the attack, Jenny had phoned her boyfriend, James White.

== Response ==
Julie Nicholson was on holiday in Wales when she and her husband, Greg, learnt Jenny had died. After going on extended compassionate leave, she decided to step down as priest from the parish of St Aidan with St George, in Bristol, eight months after Jenny's death, since she could not forgive the attacker. While announcing her intention to resign as vicar, Nicholson described how "It's very difficult to stand behind an altar and lead people in words of peace and reconciliation and forgiveness when I feel very far from that myself." She continued to work in Bristol with a community youth group.

While mourning Jenny's death, Nicholson began to write down her thoughts. These were later turned into a book: A Song for Jenny. A film of the same name was released on 5 July 2015, as an adaptation of the book. It was released almost exactly 10 years after Jenny's death.

Nicholson appeared in a 2025 four-part BBC documentary titled 7/7: The London Bombings, which explored the attacks and subsequent investigations.
