= Stan Nicholson =

English rugby league footballer

Personal information
- Full name: Stan Nicholson

Playing information
Club
Years	Team	Pld	T	G	FG	P
1959–69/70	Featherstone Rovers	122+5	9	1	0	60

Stan Nicholson is a former professional rugby league footballer who played in the 1950s, 1960s and 1970s. He played at club level for Featherstone Rovers.

== Playing career ==
Nicholson made his début for Featherstone Rovers on Saturday 4 April 1959.

=== Challenge Cup Final appearances ===
Nicholson was a reserve to travel in Featherstone Rovers' 17-12 victory over Barrow in the 1966–67 Challenge Cup Final during the 1966–67 season at Wembley Stadium, London on Saturday 13 May 1967, in front of a crowd of 76,290.

=== Testimonial match ===
Nicholson's benefit season at Featherstone Rovers took place during the 1969–70 season.

== Personal life ==
Stan Nicholson is the uncle of the rugby league footballer who played in the 1980s for Featherstone Rovers; Tony Nicholson.
