= Justice Nicholson =

Justice Nicholson may refer to:

- Alfred O. P. Nicholson (1808–1876), associate justice of the Tennessee Supreme Court
- Alastair Nicholson (born 1938), chief justice of the Family Court of Australia
- Colin Nicholson (1936–2015), justice of the High Court of the Cook Islands
- George M. Nicholson (1874–1963), associate justice of the Oklahoma Supreme Court
- Isaac R. Nicholson (1789/1790–1844), associate justice of the Supreme Court of Mississippi
- Joseph Hopper Nicholson (1770–1817), associate justice of the Maryland Court of Appeals

== See also ==
- Judge Nicholson (disambiguation)
