= W. G. Riddell =

William Glendinning Riddell (20 October 1865 – 1 October 1957) was a magistrate in New Zealand.

== History ==
Caricature by David Low

Riddell was born in Ivybank, Otago Peninsula, New Zealand, a son of Walter Riddell and Wilhelmina Brown Riddell née Glendinning.

He was appointed magistrate in Invercargill, New Zealand in January 1905.

He made news in Australia in the case of a high-ranking public servant who had behaved indecently before young schoolgirls in a park. Rather than impose a jail sentence Riddell had him admitted to a mental health institution for a year, eligible for early release if recognised as no longer likely to offend. The newspaper questioned whether a laborer would get the same treatment.

He retired from the Bench in December 1928. Tributes from H. Johnston, president of the Wellington Law Society were published in the national newspapers.

He died in Wellington.

== Recognition ==
Riddell was the subject of a caricature by David Low, published in Caricatures by Low (1915).
