= Sharon Nicholson =

Meteorology professor

Sharon E. Nicholson
- Education: University of Wisconsin–Madison (BS, MS, and Doctoral degrees in meteorology)
- Occupations: Meteorology professor at the Department of Earth, Ocean and Atmospheric Science, Florida State University
- Years active: 1985–present
- Known for: International climate research and teaching students for almost forty years.
- Notable work: A study on Sahara desert, journal Ambio (co-author); the research on African climate, journal Science (co author)
- Title: Professor of Meteorology
- Term: 1991 – present
- Awards: Awards

Sharon E. Nicholson is a meteorology professor at Florida State University (FSU) in the Department of Earth, Ocean and Atmospheric Science. Nicholson has been teaching about and researching climates of Africa. Nicholson has earned the Humboldt Award, the Fulbright Global Scholar award, and a National Science Foundation Award.

== Biography ==
Sharon Nicholson got her bachelor's, master's, and doctoral degrees in meteorology at the University of Wisconsin–Madison. In 1985, she became the only female faculty member at the FSU Department of Earth, Ocean and Atmospheric Science, beginning as an associate professor. In 1991, she was promoted to full professor of meteorology, and as of 2020, continues to work and teach at the FSU.

== Research ==
Paired with Compton Tucker, a NASA Goddard Space Flight Center scientist, Nicholson disproved a worldwide claim about recent Sahara desert spreading. They studied nearly two decades of Sahel satellite observations to confirm that the desert ebbs and flows, but does not enlarge. Nicholson also established that the Sahara's behavior depends on climate cycles (year-to-year rainfalls and droughts). Their study was published in the journal Ambio.

Nicholson also teamed up with Dorcas N. Leposo, a research meteorologist from the Botswana Meteorological Services, to establish that El Niño was the primary cause of drought and famine in Botswana. They reviewed 40 years of Southern Africa climate data to explore El Niño's impact on the region and estimate the impact of future climate change there. The Botswana government used their research to mitigate the possible effects of El Niño's onset.

As an FSU professor and expert on the African climate, Nicholson visited Africa to closely study rainfall and fog. She also took part in climate change research with the National Center for Atmospheric Research, and was co-author of a study published in the journal Science.

In 2010, working with the Gobabeb Training and Research Centre, Nicholson was the first to identify a low-level weather jet stream over Namibia. Working with specialists from France and Germany, Nicholson researched the jet stream's possible influence on climate in equatorial and southern Africa and its effect on rainfall in West Africa.

Nicholson's research has influenced areas beyond meteorology, such as hydrology, physical geography, remote sensing, arid land studies and paleoclimatology. One of Nicholson's colleagues opined that thanks to Nicholson's contributions, FSU became recognized as the leading academic institution in the U.S. for research on the climate of Africa. Nicholson also inspired more students to get involved in the study of meteorology.

== Awards ==
In 2019, Nicholson earned a Fulbright Global Scholar Award for executing research in Namibia, France (University of Montpellier), and Germany (Karlsruhe Institute of Technology).

Nicholson's study of climate over arid environments earned her the Humboldt Research Award, given by the Alexander von Humboldt Foundation in Germany. In 2009, she was honored by the American Meteorological Society with the Charles E. Anderson Award.

Nicholson has been awarded several grants from the National Science Foundation for her research in the Congo Basin. The National Science Foundation Faculty Award granted her $250,000 for women scientists and engineers.

Nicholson was awarded the 2027 Hydrological Sciences Metal from the American Meteological Society.

== Literature cited ==
- Farnum-Patronis, Amy (ed.), "Department of Earth, Ocean & Atmospheric Science: Academic Faculty", Florida State University News, Tallahassee: Florida State University, OCLC 1346845
- "Florida State University's Sharon Nicholson Honored by the Humboldt Foundation in Germany", Women in Academia Report, Bartonsville: BruCon Publishing Company, January 16, 2020, OCLC 988830208
- Blackburn, Doug (December 29, 2014), "Campus Notes", Tallahassee Democrat, Tallahassee: Capital City Publishing Company, pp. 7A, ISSN 0738-5153, LCCN sn83005708, OCLC 8253038
- Dobson, Byron (July 15, 2019), Hatfield, William (ed.), "Campus Notes", Tallahassee Democrat, Tallahassee: Capital City Publishing Company, pp. 2A, ISSN 0738-5153, LCCN sn83005708, OCLC 8253038
- Harris, Cindy (February 24, 1992), "FSU professor gains national science award", Tallahassee Democrat, Tallahassee: Capital City Publishing Company, pp. 5B, ISSN 0738-5153, LCCN sn83005708, OCLC 8253038
- Heller, Dave (July 10, 2019), Farnum-Patronis, Amy (ed.), "FSU meteorology professor wins distinguished Humboldt Research Award", Florida State University News, Tallahassee: Florida State University, OCLC 1346845
- Riordan, Mark A. (April 2, 1998), "Scientists track El Nino's impact on Botswana rain", Tallahassee Democrat, Tallahassee: Capital City Publishing Company, pp. 4C, ISSN 0738-5153, LCCN sn83005708, OCLC 8253038
- Robinson, Amy (January 10, 2020), Farnum-Patronis, Amy (ed.), "FSU meteorology professor wins distinguished Humboldt Research Award", Florida State University News, Tallahassee: Florida State University, OCLC 1346845
- Welch, Amy (December 31, 1998), "Program uses art for social outreach", Tallahassee Democrat, Tallahassee: Capital City Publishing Company, pp. 6C, ISSN 0738-5153, LCCN sn83005708, OCLC 8253038
