= Edward Nicolson =

English cricketer (born 1964)

Edward Nicolson (born John Edward MacDonald Nicolson on 17 June 1964) was an English cricketer. He was a right-handed batsman and right-arm medium-pace bowler who played for Cornwall. He was born in Birmingham.

Nicolson, who had previously played in the Second XI Championship for Worcestershire, and who played Minor Counties cricket for Cornwall between 1988 and 1995, made his only List A appearance for the side during the 1995 season, against Middlesex. From the upper-middle order, he scored 38 runs.
