= John Sinclair (New Zealand politician) =

New Zealand politician

Sir John Robert Sinclair (1850 – 3 December 1940) was a lawyer and a member of the New Zealand Legislative Council from 1907 to 1914, and from 1918 to 1932.

Caricature by David Low

Sinclair was born in Anglesey in Wales in 1850. His father was Scottish and had moved to Anglesey in the 1830s. He received his early education in Wales before coming with his family to Port Chalmers in New Zealand in the early 1860s. Sinclair continued his secondary school education in Dunedin and the University of Otago, from where he graduated in 1875.

Based in Dunedin, he worked as a solicitor for the Dunedin City Council, other municipal bodies, and the Dunedin Drainage Board. Prior to his appointment to the Legislative Council, he took no part in political life, but had been chairman of the Otago High Schools Board, and held several directorships with finance companies. He became a partner in a firm in Dunedin and two of his other partners, Frederick Chapman and William Cunningham MacGregor later became judges of the Supreme Court. He was a member of a number of organisations, including the Chamber of Commerce, the Otago Acclimatisation Society, the Athenaeum Committee, the Dunedin Horticultural Society, the Arts Society, and the Amenities and Town Planning Society.

He was appointed to the Legislative Council on 22 January 1907 and served until the end of the expiry of his seven-year term on 21 January 1914; and 7 May 1918 to 6 May 1925 then 7 May 1925 to 6 May 1932 when his term ended. He was appointed by the Liberal Government, then the Reform Government. He represented New Zealand on the Dominions Royal Commission from 1912 to 1917.

He was knighted in the 1918 New Year Honours, and the king passed the letters patent on 6 February 1918. He died on 3 December 1940, aged 90.
