= Donald Nicholson =

Donald Nicholson may refer to:

- Donald W. Nicholson (1888–1968), American politician
- Donald Nicholson (Canadian politician) (1850–1932), Canadian politician
- Donald Nicholson (biochemist) (1916–2012), English biochemist
