= Kevin Nicholson =

Kevin Nicholson may refer to:

- Kevin Nicholson (baseball) (born 1976), Canadian baseball player
- Kevin Nicholson (footballer) (born 1980), English footballer
- Kevin Nicholson (judge) on list of judges of the Supreme Court of South Australia
- Kevin Nicholson (businessman), candidate for United States Senate election in Wisconsin, 2018
