= Nigel Nicholson =

British business psychologist

- Education: University College, Cardiff; University of Wales
- Known for: Evolutionary psychology
- Scientific career
- Fields: Management; Organizational psychology
- Workplaces: London Business School
- Thesis: Employee absence (1975)

Nigel Nicholson FBPsS FBAM is a British business psychologist and Emeritus Professor of Organisational Behaviour at London Business School. He is known for his work advocating the application of evolutionary psychology to business management.
