= George Wishart Smith =

George Wishart Smith (1868 – before 1960), sometimes written Wishart-Smith, was a railway executive in Western Australia and Railway Commissioner in Tasmania, from which service he was suspended after mounting costs and deteriorating patronage.

== History ==
Smith was born in Scotland, a son of David Smith and Catherine Wishart.

Caricature by David Low

He emigrated to New South Wales, and was living at South Clifton when he married a daughter of A. Broadhead in 1894; they then left for Western Australia. He was accountant for the Midland Railway Company when he was appointed Assistant General Manager in 1898. He was living at Midland Junction when he was appointed Justice of the Peace in 1909.

He had been General Manager of the Midland Railway Company for 12 years when he was selected from 38 applicants to head the Tasmanian Government Railways (TGR) in 1911.

He was awarded the OBE in 1921 but was unable to attend the ceremony.

He was suspended by the Premier (Sir Walter Lee) in September 1923 following a Royal Commission into operation of the railways and recommendations by the Executive Council, meeting in Launceston, which found that Smith was guilty of "negligence, incompetence and misbehavior"

In suing the Tasmanian Government for wrongful dismissal he demanded specific details on each of these allegations, but was met with a series of postponements and delays, during which, of course, Smith received no salary.

== Family ==
Smith was living at South Clifton, New South Wales when he married Elizabeth Jane Lindsay, (adopted?) daughter of Alfred Broadhead, licensee of the Scarborough Hotel, Clifton, on 4 Jun 1894. Their children included:

- George Clifton Smith (1894–1983) made headlines when his wife of four days deserted him. They divorced in 1923. He married Yvonne Wedlock in Sydney in 1930.
- David Douglas Wishart-Smith (19 Nov 1897 – 1984) married Margaret Grace Murray on 16 April 1925
- Alexander Baillie Smith (1900 – July 1906)
- Hector Archibald Wishart-Smith (1902–1966) married Edna Clarice Day on 10 February 1931.
- Madeline Jean Smith (9 December 1904 – 1987)
- Ian Wishart Smith (2 March 1913 – 1997) was a prominent golfer. He married Patricia Wilson on 29 December 1937.
