= Ed Nicholson =

Canadian ice hockey player

- Born: September 9, 1923; Portsmouth, Ontario, Canada
- Died: January 15, 1987 (aged 63)
- Height: 5 ft 8 in (173 cm)
- Weight: 180 lb (82 kg; 12 st 12 lb)
- Position: Defence
- Shot: Left
- Played for: Detroit Red Wings
- Playing career: 1943–1955

Edward George Nicholson (September 9, 1923 – January 15, 1987) was a Canadian professional ice hockey defenceman who played in one National Hockey League game for the Detroit Red Wings during the 1947–48 season, on March 21, 1948 against the Toronto Maple Leafs. The rest of his career, which lasted from 1943 to 1955, was spent in various minor leagues.

== Career statistics ==
=== Regular season and playoffs ===
			Regular season					Playoffs
Season	Team	League	GP	G	A	Pts	PIM	GP	G	A	Pts	PIM
1943–44	Kingston Frontenacs	OHA Sr	—	—	—	—	—	—	—	—	—	—
1944–45	Kingston Frontenacs	OHA Sr	—	—	—	—	—	—	—	—	—	—
1945–46	Army Engineers	SCO	—	—	—	—	—	—	—	—	—	—
1946–47	Indianapolis Capitals	AHL	57	4	10	14	79	—	—	—	—	—
1947–48	Indianapolis Capitals	AHL	65	5	16	21	63	—	—	—	—	—
1947–48	Detroit Red Wings	NHL	1	0	0	0	0	—	—	—	—	—
19468–49	Indianapolis Capitals	AHL	65	3	24	27	46	2	0	0	0	0
1949–50	St. Louis Flyers	AHL	70	12	19	31	20	2	0	0	0	0
1950–51	St. Louis Flyers	AHL	68	8	24	32	37	—	—	—	—	—
1951–52	St. Louis Flyers	AHL	50	2	11	13	23	—	—	—	—	—
1952–53	Kingston Goodyears	OSRB	—	—	—	—	—	—	—	—	—	—
1953–54	Kingston Goodyears	OSHA-B	—	—	—	—	—	—	—	—	—	—
1954–55	Kingston Goodyears	OSHA-B	—	—	—	—	—	—	—	—	—	—
AHL totals			375	34	104	138	268	4	0	0	0	2
NHL totals			1	0	0	0	0	—	—	—	—	—

== See also ==
- List of players who played only one game in the NHL
