= Chris Nicholson (magician) =

British magician

Chris Nicholson (aka Chris Paris 2011-19 & Chris Nixon since 2020)
- Occupation: Magician
- Website: www.chrisnicholsonmagician.com

Chris Nicholson is a close up magician who starred in the popular teenage magic show, Playing Tricks.

== Biography ==
Nicholson grew up in Brighton and began learning magic from the age of 10. He won his first award from The Magic Circle Youth Initiative when he was just 15 years old.

His first television appearance was on MTV's On Call with Richard Blackwood. Nicholson impressed the presenter who said "David Blaine". He successfully auditioned for the new hidden camera magic show that aired on Trouble TV's, Playing Tricks. The show featured seven of Britain's finest young magicians performing to an unsuspecting public. But the show only lasted one series.

Nicholson went on to appear on Ready Steady Cook with fellow Playing Tricks star Tariq Knight. He also appeared on ITV2's A Few Records More and broke the Guinness World Record for Most Bras Unhooked in One Minute.

He is also part of the comedy duo, Black and Paris, under his other alias, Chris Paris. He and his partner, Matt Black, performed a number of stage shows with magic, comedy and special guests. They made an impact on the magic world with a parody of David Blaine's stunt where he lived above the River Thames in a transparent Plexiglas case for 44 days; Black and Paris lived in a cardboard box on Brighton beach for 44 hours while interacting with the local residents. They also made an appearance on the Sky One hit show, Whatever.

He appeared on Britain's Got Talent (2014) and Italy's Got Talent (2019). But following unsuccessful stints as a fast food delivery 'boy' along the Sussex south coast he has reinvented himself as Chris Nixon since 2020 as homage to the British master magician David Nixon.
