= David Nicholson (journalist) =

David Nicholson (born 23 July 1963 in Elgin, Scotland) is a British freelance journalist, broadcaster and editor. He has written for UK and international publications and websites since 1986, contributing to the Financial Times, The Daily Telegraph, The Guardian, The Wall Street Journal and The Independent, among others, authoring several books, presenting television programmes and running a press agency.

== Education and early career ==
David Nicholson graduated with an English Literature degree from Trinity College, Cambridge, in 1986. Later that year he was appointed assistant editor of The Business of Film magazine, a monthly international film and television industry publication which also produced a daily magazine during the Cannes film festival.

== Career as a freelance journalist ==
David Nicholson's freelance career began in the summer of 1987. Starting with articles on the media, he went on to specialise in business, property, sport, travel, politics, technology and the environment.

David Nicholson has presented economic analysis programmes for Business Week TV, interviewing authors, academics and commentators on subjects ranging from the global banking crisis to the state of the environment. He has appeared on UK and international TV channels, besides broadcasting on the BBC World Service, Radio 4 and many local stations. He reviewed films for the short-lived TV station Live! TV, where his co-presenter was Richard Bacon. He also writes weekly blogs.

== Works ==
David Nicholson's publications include:

- The European Black Book – a guide to eating, lodging and events in 50 European cities

Several corporate histories: Dutch engineering company Bluewater (called Pump or Drown)

- Japanese technology company Fujitsu
- Saudi Electricity Company
- German engineering company ThyssenKrupp
- Profile of Brazilian President Lula da Silva

He has edited Finance International, Outlook, and Global Property Advisor.

David Nicholson runs online content agency Words on the Web and a press agency alongside his other journalistic work.

== Other interests ==
David Nicholson runs the North London Self-Employed Lunch Club which hosts biannual events bringing freelancers together from across the Capital. The lunches are known as "office parties for the self-employed". He runs the Butler XI cricket team which plays against other media teams and village sides, around London and the South East, including the Captain Scott XI and Private Eye. The Butler XI plays at grounds including Arundel Castle, Eton College and Blenheim Palace along with various college grounds in Oxford and Cambridge. Each year the team tours overseas and has visited Paris, Geneva, Copenhagen and Dublin.
