= Francis Nicholls (artist) =

New Zealand artist (1966–2020)

- Born: Peter Francis Nicholls; 1966; Amberley, New Zealand
- Died: 21 June 2020 (aged 54); Dunedin, New Zealand
- Known for: Painting
- Spouse: Michelle Perniskie (married 1995)

Peter Francis Nicholls (1966–21 June 2020), known as Francis, was a New Zealand landscape painter.

Nicholls was born into a farming family at Amberley in North Canterbury in 1966. He studied at Lincoln College from 1983.

In 1998, he moved to Sydney, Australia, where he became enamoured of the art of Heidelberg School artists such as Arthur Streeton. Nicholls' later style was heavily influenced by these painters, with the use of rich slabs of colour applied in heavy impasto to give a visceral impression of the land. Many of his landscapes were produced in a strict square format, one described by the artist as: "...having its own composition challenges, [while being] a shape I really enjoy working with."

Nicholls returned to New Zealand in 2014, settling in Dunedin. He adopted his middle name as his professional name so as to avoid confusion with his contemporary, Dunedin sculptor Peter Nicholls.

Nicholls died of cancer at Dunedin Public Hospital in 2020, aged 54. He was survived by his wife, Michelle, whom he had married in 1995. Otago Art Society's annual landscape award is named in his honour.
