= Francis Nicholson (disambiguation) =

Francis Nicholson (1655–1728) was a British military officer and colonial governor.

Francis Nicholson may also refer to:

- Francis Nicholson (painter) (1753–1844), English painter
- Francis Joseph Nicholson, Bishop of Roman Catholic Archdiocese of Corfu, Zakynthos and Cephalonia

== See also ==
- Frank Nicholson (disambiguation)
