= J. C. Nicholson =

American judge

- Born: 1942 (age 83–84); Birmingham, Alabama
- Education: The Citadel, The Military College of South Carolina
- Alma mater: University of South Carolina School of Law
- Occupation: Judge
- Years active: 1973–present
- Employer: South Carolina Circuit Court
- Children: Four, including South Carolina Assistant Attorney General J.C. Nicholson III
- Parent(s): Frances E. and Julius Carnes Nicholson Sr.

Julius Carnes "J. C." Nicholson Jr. (born 1942) is an American judge who sits on the South Carolina Circuit Court.

== Early life ==
Nicholson was born in Birmingham, Alabama, to parents Frances E. and Julius Carnes Nicholson Sr. He grew up in Camden, South Carolina. After attending The Citadel, The Military College of South Carolina, he entered the United States Air Force, where he rose to the rank of lieutenant colonel. He spent four years in the Air Force, and went on to the University of South Carolina School of Law.

== Career ==
Nicholson started his legal career as Assistant Solicitor for Orangeburg County, South Carolina. From 1973 to 1974 he served in that position full-time, while from 1974 to 1976 he reduced his hours to part-time while also working in private practice. In 1976 he was elected a member of the county council for Orangeburg County, in which position he continued until 1982. From 1983 to 1984 he was Assistant Solicitor for Greenville County. He then returned to private practice at Epps and Krause, where he became a partner in 1986. He was elected as a circuit court judge in 1999. He retired officially in 2009; however, after retirement, he continued to work for the court system as a part-time circuit judge. He stated in a newspaper interview at the time, "I am 66. It's time to slow down. But I don't think you can go from doing this full-time to suddenly just stopping altogether."

== Major cases and rulings ==
=== Stand-your-ground law and domestic violence ===
Nicholson received widespread notice for his ruling in State v. Jones, a case in which a woman was charged with the murder of her boyfriend. In November 2012, the couple had a dispute at their shared residence; when Jones attempted to leave, her boyfriend punched her and grabbed her by the hair, and she stabbed him. In a pre-trial immunity hearing, Nicholson ruled that the state's "stand-your-ground" statute, the Protection of Property and Persons Act, gave Jones immunity for the killing of her boyfriend. The law protects the actions of a person who uses deadly force and "who is not engaged in an unlawful activity and who is attacked in another place where he has a right to be"; prosecutors had argued that the phrase "another place" should not include a home in which the attacker resided, but Nicholson disagreed, stating in his ruling that prosecutors' reading of the law would create a "nonsensical result" in which a person could defend him- or herself against an intimate partner's attack outside of the home but not within it.

Prosecutors criticized Nicholson's ruling and indicated their intent to appeal, as it also affected two other outstanding cases. Amanda Marcotte, writing in Slate, praised the ruling, stating that while she found stand-your-ground laws to be problematic, "if a state insists on having them, they should be applied evenly and fairly". However, a Salon column by Jenny Kutner disagreed with Nicholson's reading of the law, noting that the "presumption of fear" required for a use of deadly force to be found lawful did not apply within the home; Kutner stated that Jones' case instead demonstrated the need for South Carolina to pass new laws which protected survivors of domestic violence.

=== 2015 Charleston church shooting ===
In 2015, Nicholson was assigned as presiding judge for the trial of Dylann Roof, who is charged with committing the Charleston church shooting on June 17 that year. Nicholson set Roof's trial date for July 11, 2016. Nicholson's gag order in the case, forbidding the release of photographs of victims and recordings of 9-1-1 calls under the South Carolina Freedom of Information Act, has been challenged by news media, while survivors and victims' families have spoken in favor of maintaining it. A hearing on the gag order will be held at an indeterminate date in the future. Nicholson has also ordered Roof to provide handwriting samples to verify whether he wrote notes that "contain evidence of guilt and motive".

== Family ==
Nicholson has four children and nine grandchildren. His son, Julius Carnes Nicholson III, is a lawyer with the Office of the South Carolina Attorney General.
