= Robert B. Nicholson =

Robert Balfour Nicholson (1863 – 22 July 1917) was an Australian businessman, best known as general manager of Ivanhoe Gold Mine, Kalgoorlie, Western Australia.

== History ==
Caricature by David Low

Nicholson was born in Essendon, Victoria, the second son of C. H. Nicholson, Superintendent of Police. He was educated at Hawthorn Grammar School under E. H. Irving, later editor of the Kalgoorlie Miner. In his early years he was employed in business houses and on pastoral properties. He was a prominent oarsman, being captain of the Victorian eight for some years. He left for Western Australia in 1893, managing mines at Menzies, Broad Arrow, and Paddington, where he was in charge of the Consols. In 1900 he took control of the Ivanhoe, where he was extremely popular with the mine-workers, being generally recognised as a decent and considerate employer. He was for several years vice-president of the Chamber of Mines.

== Last days and death ==
On 9 July Nicholson was thrown out of his trap, resulting in a badly broken arm. His doctor advised against setting the limb owing to his declining health, and he died a fortnight later. The funeral procession was led by 400 miners and the hearse was not able to carry the mass of floral tributes to this popular and respected employer.
