= Nichol =

Nichol is a surname. Notable people with the name include:

- Andrew Nichol (born 1974), Australian rules footballer
- B. P. Nichol (1944–1988), Canadian poet
- Barbara Nichol (born c. 1956), Canadian writer and documentary maker
- Cameron Nichol (born 1987), British rower
- Camilla Nichol, British geologist
- Damian Nichol (1930–2015), South African rower
- Dave Nichol (1940–2013), Canadian businessman
- David Nichol (cricketer) (1914–1995), Scottish cricketer
- Doug Nichol, American filmmaker
- Duncan Kirkbride Nichol (born 1941), British hospital administrator
- Elizabeth Pease Nichol (1807–1897), English abolitionist and anti-segregationist
- Francis D. Nichol (1897–1966), Australian Seventh-day Adventist leader
- Fred Joseph Nichol (1912–1996), American judge
- Gene Nichol (born 1951), American lawyer and educator
- Helen Nichol (born 1981), Canadian badminton player
- Jacki Nichol (born 1972), Canadian softball player
- James W. Nichol (born 1940), Canadian playwright and novelist
- Jean Nichol (1944–2020), Canadian singer and songwriter
- Jefri Nichol (born 1999), Indonesian actor and model
- John Nichol (biographer) (1833–1894), Scottish biographer
- John Nichol (footballer) (born 1879), English footballer (Grimsby Town)
- John Nichol (RAF officer) (born 1963), Royal Air Force navigator
- John Lang Nichol (born 1924), Canadian senator
- John Pringle Nichol (1804–1859), Scottish scientist; mentor to William Thomson
- Joseph McGinty Nichol (born 1968), American film director
- Keith Nichol (born, 1988), American football player
- Lori Nichol, Canadian figure skating choreographer and coach
- Maurice Nichol (1904–1934), English cricketer
- Muriel Nichol (1893–1983), Labour Party politician in England
- Phil Nichol, Canadian comedian
- Robert Nichol (British politician) (1890–1925), British member of parliament
- Robert Nichol (Canadian politician) (c. 1780–1824), Canadian businessman and political figure
- Robert Nichol (cinematographer), Canadian cinematographer, director, and writer
- Robert Nichol (cricketer) (1924–1996), Scottish cricketer
- Rohan Nichol (born 1976), Australian television and film actor
- Scott Nichol (ice hockey) (born 1974), Canadian ice hockey player
- Scott Nichol (rugby union) (born 1970), Scottish rugby union player
- Shannon Nichol, American landscape architect
- Walter Cameron Nichol (1866–1928), Canadian journalist, newspaper editor and publisher
- Wilfred Nichol (1901–1955), British athlete
- William Nichol (cricketer) (1912–1973), Scottish cricketer
- William E. Nichol (1918–2006), American politician
- William Nichol (mayor) (1800–1878), American banker and politician

== Fictional characters ==
- Caleb Nichol, fictional character from The O.C.
- Hailey Nichol, fictional character from The O.C.
