= Scottish Rugby Schools' Cup =

Annual Scottish schools' rugby union competition

The Scottish Rugby Schools' Cup is the annual Scottish schools' rugby union cup competition. Competitions are held at under-18 and under-16 age group levels and are organised by Scottish Rugby. The finals are held at Murrayfield Stadium in Edinburgh.

The competitions have had many different formats over the years. For season 2024–25 there are four competitions for each age group, the Cup, Shield, Plate and Bowl. The main cup competitions involve a straight knock-out format. In 2013-14 a new shield competition was introduced for those teams eliminated in the preliminary and first rounds of the cup competitions.

The fixtures and results are regularly posted on the Scottish Rugby website and in the mainstream media. Previous sponsors include the Bank of Scotland, Bell Lawrie White and Brewin Dolphin.

== Champions ==
Key
†	Match tied - cup shared

=== U18 Cup ===
The inaugural competition took place in the 1983–84 season.

Prior to the 1997–98 season, most private schools did not participate in the U18 Cup.

Season	Champions	Final	Runners-up
1983–84	North Berwick High School	6 – 0	Marr College
1984–85	Galashiels Academy	21 – 9	Dunblane High School
1985–86	Galashiels Academy	10 – 0	Dunblane High School
1986–87	Kelso High School		Dunblane High School
1987–88	Galashiels Academy		St Aloysius' College
1988–89	St Aloysius' College	16 – 0	Galashiels Academy
1989–90	St Aloysius' College	19 – 15	Galashiels Academy
1990–91	Galashiels Academy		St Aloysius' College
1991–92	Marr College	8 – 6	St Aloysius' College
1992–93	St Aloysius' College	18 – 12	Galashiels Academy
1993–94	Marr College	16 – 12	St Aloysius' College
1994–95	St Aloysius' College	42 – 17	Queen Victoria School
1995–96	St Aloysius' College	13 – 12	Peebles High School
1996–97	Galashiels Academy	8 – 7	High School of Dundee
1997–98	Merchiston Castle School	27 – 8	Edinburgh Academy
1998–99	Stewart's Melville College	8 – 3	Merchiston Castle School
1999–00	Merchiston Castle School	22 – 8	Dollar Academy
2000–01	Merchiston Castle School	10 – 5	Fettes College
2001–02	Merchiston Castle School	44 – 21	George Watson's College
2002–03	Dollar Academy	19 – 13	Stewart's Melville College
2003–04	Dollar Academy	27 – 14	High School of Dundee
2004–05	Dollar Academy	13 – 10	High School of Dundee
2005–06	Stewart's Melville College	32 – 0	Robert Gordon's College
2006–07	Bell Baxter High School	20 – 8	Dollar Academy
2007–08	Merchiston Castle School	15 – 3	George Watson's College
2008–09	Fettes College	39 – 28	Stewart's Melville College
2009–10	Edinburgh Academy	13 – 11	Stewart's Melville College
2010–11	Stewart's Melville College	19 – 10	Edinburgh Academy
2011–12	Edinburgh Academy	12 – 11	George Watson's College
2012–13	George Watson's College	22 – 17	Merchiston Castle School
2013–14	George Watson's College	31 – 17	High School of Dundee
2014–15	George Watson's College	23 – 17	Merchiston Castle School
2015–16	George Watson's College	30 – 27	Dollar Academy
2016–17	Stewart's Melville College	36 – 32	Dollar Academy
2017–18	Strathallan School	52 – 8	Glenalmond College
2018–19	Merchiston Castle School	40 – 7	St Aloysius' College
2019–20	Stewart's Melville College	24 – 14	George Watson's College
2020–21	No competition (due to COVID-19 pandemic)		
2021–22	Merchiston Castle School	20 – 7	Stewart's Melville College
2022–23	Merchiston Castle School	19 – 7	Edinburgh Academy
2023–24	George Watson's College	42 – 21	Stewart's Melville College
2024–25	Stewart's Melville College	28 – 24	Merchiston Castle School
2025–26	George Watson's College	33 – 21	Strathallan School

==== Summary of champions ====
#	Team	Champions	Years as champions	Runners-up	Years as runners-up
1	Merchiston Castle School	8	1997–98, 1999–00, 2000–01, 2001–02, 2007–08, 2018–19, 2021–22, 2022–23	4	1998–99, 2012–13, 2014–15, 2024–25
2	Stewart's Melville College	6	1998–99, 2005–06, 2010–11, 2016–17, 2019–20, 2024–25	5	2002–03, 2008–09, 2009–10, 2021–22, 2023–24
2	George Watson's College	6	2012–13, 2013–14, 2014–15, 2015–16, 2023–24, 2025–26	4	2001–02, 2007–08, 2011–12, 2019–20
4	St Aloysius' College	5	1988–89, 1989–90, 1992–93, 1994–95, 1995–96	5	1987–88, 1990–91, 1991–92, 1993–94, 2018–19
4	Galashiels Academy	5	1984–85, 1985–86, 1987–88, 1990–91, 1996–97	2	1988–89, 1989–90
6	Dollar Academy	3	2002–03, 2003–04, 2004–05	4	1999–00, 2006–07, 2015–16, 2016–17
7	Edinburgh Academy	2	2009–10, 2011–12	3	1997–98, 2010–11, 2022–23
7	Marr College	2	1991–92, 1993–94	1	1983–84
9	Fettes College	1	2008–09	1	2000–01
9	Strathallan School	1	2017–18	1	2025–26
9	North Berwick High School	1	1983–84	—N/a	
9	Kelso High School	1	1986–87	—N/a	
9	Bell Baxter High School	1	2006–07	—N/a	

=== U15/U16 Cup ===
The inaugural competition took place in the 2004–05 season.

Season	Champions	Final	Runners-up
2004–05	North Berwick High School	21 – 10	Galashiels Academy
2005–06	Galashiels Academy	22 – 17	Robert Gordon's College
2006–07	George Watson's College	12 – 5	Edinburgh Academy
2007–08	George Watson's College	7 – 5	George Heriot's School
2008–09	Edinburgh Academy	29 – 21	George Watson's College
2009–10	Hutchesons' Grammar School	10 – 8	Stewart's Melville College

From season 2010–11 the competition evolved from the U15 Cup into the U16 Cup.

Season	Winner	Score	Runner-up
2010-11	Edinburgh Academy	36 - 8	Stewart's Melville College
2011-12	George Watson's College	38-0	Dollar Academy
2012-13	Merchiston Castle School	10-5	Strathallan School
2013-14	George Watson's College	19-8	St Aloysius' College
2014-15	Merchiston Castle School	25-24	Dollar Academy
2015-16	George Watson's College/Strathallan School	5-5	—
2016-17	St Aloysius' College	10-3	Strathallan School
2017-18	George Watson's College	64-19	Stewart's Melville College
2018-19	George Watson's College	15-5	High School of Dundee
2019-20	Merchiston Castle School	41-5	Dollar Academy
2020-21	No competition (due to COVID-19 pandemic)		
2021-22	George Watson's College	47-26	Dollar Academy
2022-23	Stewart's Melville College	43-24	Strathallan School
2023-24	George Watson's College	26-21	Stewart's Melville College
2024-25	George Watson's College	34-10	Stewart's Melville College
2025-26	Stewart's Melville College	21-12	Merchiston Castle School

== Scotland internationalists ==
Several full Scotland internationalists have played in the Schools' Cup, including:

- John Barclay
- Alasdair Dickinson
- Phil Godman
- Ruaridh Jackson
- Graeme Morrison
- Gregor Townsend
- Richie Vernon
