= Godfrey Pell =

English cricketer (1928–2023)

Personal information
- Full name: Godfrey Arnold Pell
- Born: 11 March 1928; Sunderland, County Durham, England
- Died: 2023 (aged 94–95); Birmingham, England
- Batting: Right-handed
- Bowling: Leg break googly

Domestic team information
- Years: Team
- 1947: Warwickshire

Career statistics
Competition	First-class
Matches	1
Runs scored	24
Batting average	24.00
100s/50s	–/–
Top score	16*
Balls bowled	74
Wickets	4
Bowling average	7.75
5 wickets in innings	–
10 wickets in match	–
Best bowling	2/9
Catches/stumpings	1/–
- Source: Cricinfo, 28 December 2011

Godfrey Arnold Pell (11 March 1928 – 2023) was an English cricketer. Pell was a right-handed batsman who bowled leg break googly. He was born at Sunderland, County Durham, and was educated at King Edward's School, Birmingham.

Pell made a single first-class appearance for Warwickshire against Scotland at Edgbaston in 1947. Scotland made 158 in their first-innings, with Pell taking the wickets of Robert Hodge and Robert McLaren with figures of 2/22 from 6 overs. In response Warwickshire made 210 all out, with Pell being dismissed for 8 runs by William Nichol. Scotland made just 112 in their second-innings, with Pell taking the wickets of David Merson and George Youngson to finish with figures of 2/9 from 6.2 overs. Warwickshire's target to win the match was 61, which Warwickshire made with 6 wickets down, with Pell ending the innings unbeaten on 16. This was his only major appearance for Warwickshire.

Pell died in Birmingham in 2023.
