= David Nichol (cricketer) =

Scottish cricketer

Personal information
- Full name: David Nichol
- Born: 25 August 1914; Galashiels, Selkirkshire, Scotland
- Died: 17 December 1995 (aged 81); Melrose, Roxburghshire, Scotland
- Batting: Right-handed
- Bowling: Slow left-arm orthodox
- Relatives: Robert Nichol (brother); William Nichol (brother)

Domestic team information
- Years: Team
- 1952: Scotland

Career statistics
Competition	First-class
Matches	1
Runs scored	6
Batting average	3.00
100s/50s	–/–
Top score	4
Balls bowled	78
Wickets	2
Bowling average	30.50
5 wickets in innings	–
10 wickets in match	–
Best bowling	2/61
Catches/stumpings	1/–
- Source: Cricinfo, 3 November 2022

David Nichol (25 August 1914 – 17 December 1995) was a Scottish first-class cricketer.

Nichol was born at Galashiels in August 1914 and was educated at Galashiels Academy. A club cricketer for Gala, Nichol was selected for the Scottish team to play Yorkshire at Glasgow in 1952, having originally not been a member of the squad for this match. Playing alongside his elder brother William, he took the wickets of Willie Watson and Johnny Wardle in the Yorkshire first innings for the cost of 61 runs. Batting twice in the match from the tail, he was dismissed for 4 runs in the Scotland first innings by Bill Holdsworth, while in their second innings he was dismissed for 2 runs by Ronald Wood. Nichol died at Melrose in December 1995. His younger brother, Robert, was also a first-class cricketer.
