= Youngson =

Youngson is a surname. Notable people with the surname include:

- Anne Youngson (born 1947 or 1948), English novelist
- Allan Youngson (born 1984), professional footballer
- George Youngson (1919–1982), Scottish cricketer
- Robert Youngson (1917–1974), American film producer, director, and screenwriter
