= David Merson =

English cricketer and physician

Personal information
- Full name: Ronald David Merson
- Born: 25 July 1925; Stockton-on-Tees, County Durham, England
- Died: 10 April 2011 (aged 85); Stockton-on-Tees, County Durham, England
- Batting: Right-handed

Domestic team information
- Years: Team
- 1947: Scotland

Career statistics
Competition	First-class
Matches	1
Runs scored	16
Batting average	8.00
100s/50s	–/–
Top score	15
Catches/stumpings	–/–
- Source: Cricinfo, 6 November 2022

Ronald David Merson (25 July 1925 – 10 April 2011) was an English first-class cricketer and physician.

Merson was born at Stockton-on-Tees in July 1925. He was educated north of the border in Scotland at both Merchiston Castle School and Edinburgh Academy, before matriculating to the University of Edinburgh. Playing his club cricket for Edinburgh University, Merson was selected to play for the Scottish cricket team against Warwickshire at Edgbaston during Scotland's 1947 tour of England. Batting from the upper-middle order, he was dismissed in the Scottish first innings for a single run by Eric Hollies, while in their second innings batting from the lower-middle order, he was dismissed for 15 runs by Godfrey Pell. After graduating from Edinburgh University, Merson practised as a doctor. He was commissioned on a short service appointment with the medical branch of the Royal Air Force in June 1952, with the rank of flying officer. Promotion to flight lieutenant followed in June 1953, with a further promotion to squadron leader following in June 1958. Merson died at Stockton-on-Tees in April 2011.
