= Andrew John Herbertson =

Scottish geographer (1865–1915)

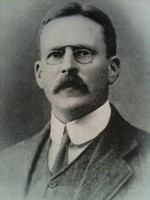
Andrew John Herbertson

Andrew John Herbertson FRSE FRGS FRMS (11 October 1865 – 15 July 1915) was a Scottish geographer.

== Life ==
He was born in Galashiels, Selkirkshire to parents Andrew Hunter Herbertson and Janet Matthewson. He went to school locally at Galashiels Academy and in Edinburgh at Edinburgh Institution. From 1886 to 1889 he studied in the University of Edinburgh, but he never gained a degree. He then gained a place at Oxford University where he graduated MA.

In 1892, he was appointed to assist Patrick Geddes with the teaching of botany at University College, Dundee. in 1892 he was made a Fellow of the Royal Geographical Society. He then moved in 1892 to Fort William, Scotland to work on a meteorological observatory on Ben Nevis. In 1894 he moved to Manchester to become a lecturer in political and commercial geography in the University of Manchester.

From 1896 to 1899, he lectured in industrial and commercial geography at Heriot-Watt College, Edinburgh. In 1896 he was elected a Fellow of the Royal Society of Edinburgh. His proposers were Peter Guthrie Tait, Sir John Murray, Ralph Copeland and Alexander Buchan.

In 1898, he received a doctorate (PhD) from University of Freiburg-im-Breisgau. In 1899 he moved to the University of Oxford to become a reader of geography; then became the first Oxford Professor of Geography in 1905. He would become head of the geography department at Oxford in 1910. In 1908 he was made a Fellow of the Royal Meteorological Society.

He died of a heart attack in Radnage, Buckinghamshire. He is buried with his wife Frances Dorothea, who had assisted with much of his teaching work and publications, in Holywell Cemetery nearby.

Their son, Lt. Andrew Hunter Herbertson, was killed at Arras in the First World War in May 1917.
