= Erskine Stewart Melville =

Private school in Scotland

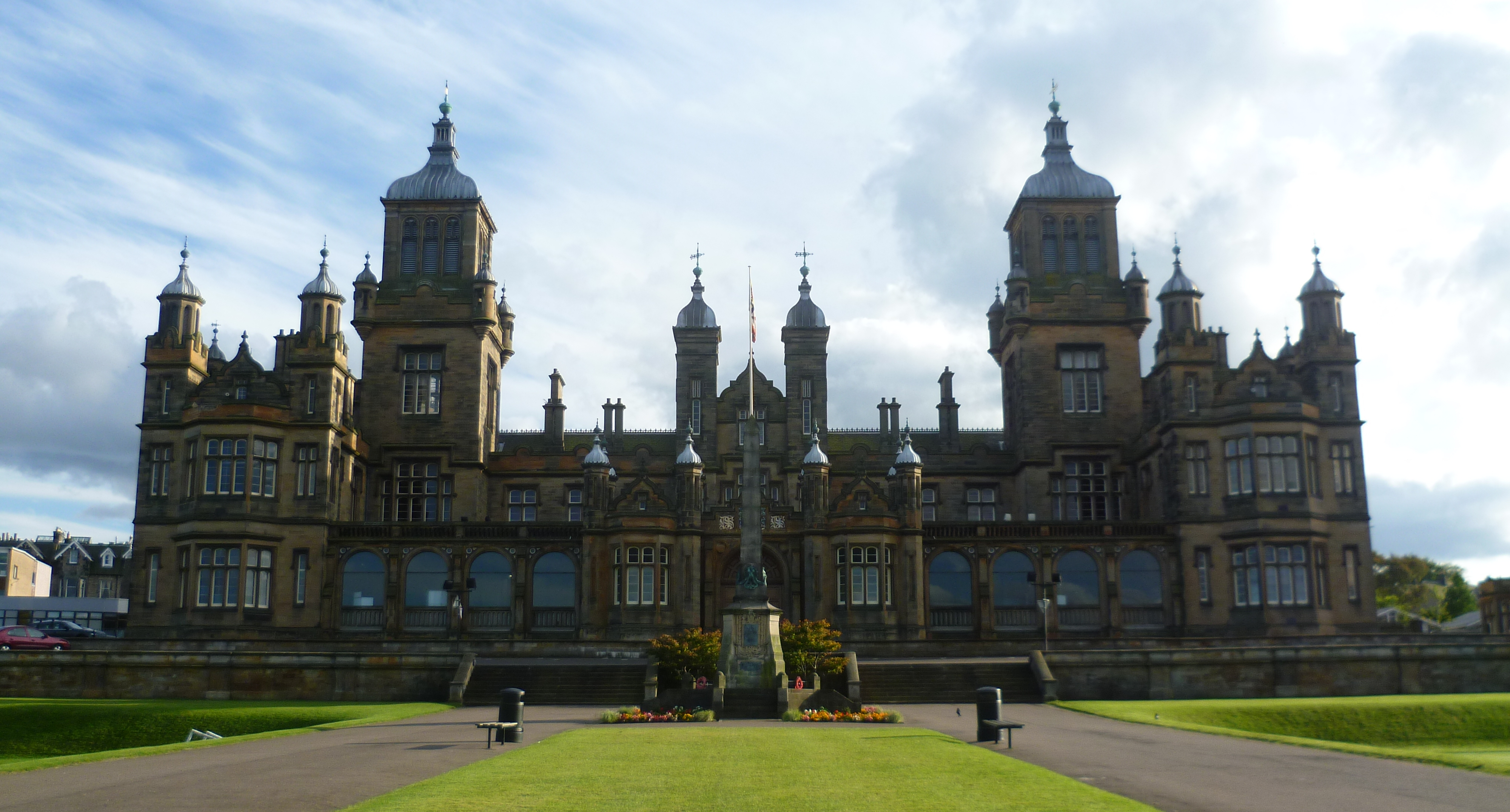

Location
- Queensferry Road; Edinburgh, EH4 3EZ; Scotland; 55°57′14″N 3°13′36″W

Information
- Type: Private Day School
- Motto: N/A
- Established: 1694; 332 years ago (The Mary Erskine School, as the Merchant Maiden Hospital); 1832; 194 years ago (Melville College, as the Edinburgh Institution); 1855; 171 years ago (Daniel Stewart's College); 1972; 54 years ago (Boys' Merger, Stewart's Melville College); 2026; 0 years ago (Coeducational Merger, Erskine Stewart Melville)
- Chair of Governing Council: Katie Ridland
- Principal: Anthony Simpson
- Head of Senior School: Frances McCrudden
- Gender: Coeducational
- Age: 3 to 18
- Enrolment: 1600 (2015)
- Colours: Red, Navy & Gold
- School fees: £13,666 (Primary 1) to £20,666 (Senior School)
- Website: www.erskinestewartmelville.com

Erskine Stewart Melville (ESM) is an private day school located in Edinburgh, Scotland managed by the Merchant Company of Edinburgh.

The coeducational school was formed through the merger of all-girls' Mary Erskine School and the all-boys' Stewart's Melville College in 2026. The Mary Erskine School was founded in 1694 as the Merchant Maiden Hospital, whilst Stewart's Meville College was founded in 1972 following the merger of Daniel's Stewart's College and Melville College. Daniel Stewart's College opened as Daniel Stewart's Hospital in 1848, being renamed to Daniel Stewart's College in 1870. Melville College opened as the Edinburgh Institution for Languages and Mathematics in 1832, and acquired its final name in 1936. Prior to the 2026 merger, the schools shared a coeducational Junior School, Sixth Form, and extra-curricular program.

The school is spread across three campuses, with the Senior School located within David Rhind's 1855 Scots Baronial Old College at Comely Bank, the Junior School at Ravelston, and the playing fields at Inverleith. In 2014, the combined school claimed to be the largest independent school in Europe.

The school is part of the Headmasters' and Headmistresses' Conference.

== History ==
The coeducational Erskine Stewart Melville was formed through the merger of the all-girls' The Mary Erskine School and the all-boys' Stewart's Melville College in 2026.

Predecessors of Erskine Stewart Melville

The Mary Erskine School (fmr. Merchant Maiden Hospital, 1694-2026)
Erskine Stewart Melville (2026-)
Daniel Stewart's College (1855-1972)
Stewart's Melville College (fmr. Daniel Stewart's & Melville College, 1972-2026)
Melville College (fmr. Edinburgh Institution, 1832-1972)

=== The Mary Erskine School ===
Arms of the former Mary Erskine School

The Merchant Maiden Hospital was founded by Mary Erskine, a prominent Edinburgh banking businesswoman, in 1694 at the Merchant Company of Edinburgh's first Merchants' Hall in the Cowgate.

Initially founded as a hospital school for the daughters of Edinburgh burgesses, it was refounded by act of Parliament as a day school in 1870, and renamed the Edinburgh Educational Institution For Girls. By this time, the school had grown to 1,200 students, and in 1871 it moved into Queen Street, where it became familiarly known as Queen Street School. In 1889, the school was renamed again as Edinburgh Ladies' College, before acquiring its final name - The Mary Erskine School - in 1944. In 1966, the school moved to Ravelston, Murrayfield.

=== Stewart's Melville College ===
Arms of the former Stewart's Meville College

Stewart's Melville College originated from the merger of the Merchant Company of Edinburgh's two all-boys' day schools - Daniel Stewart's College and Melville College - in 1972.

==== Daniel Stewart's College ====
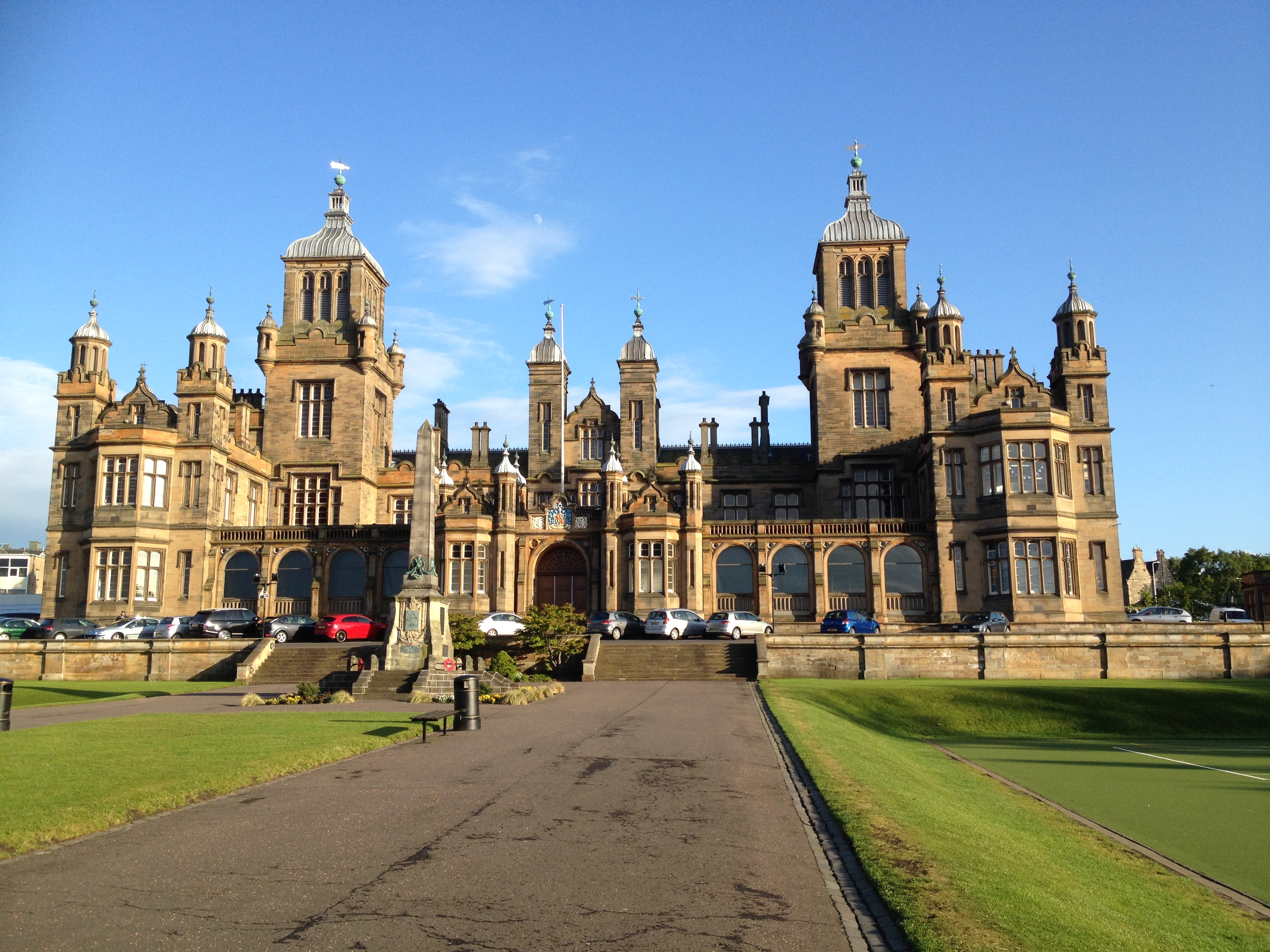
Front of David Rhind's building of 1855 for Daniel Stewart's Hospital - the modern Senior School.

Daniel Stewart's Hospital was founded in memory of Daniel Stewart, an Edinburgh-based merchant and Macer to the Court of the Exchequer. Upon his death in 1814, Stewart left a sum of money and instructions that, once it had reached £40,000, it was to be used to create a hospital for needy boys within the city.

Located on the current Queensferry Road campus, the David Rhind-designed Old College was opened in 1855. Refounded as Daniel Stewart's College following the passage of the passage of the Education Act of 1872, the school became fee-paying. From 1924 onwards, the College's uniform was a cap with red and black stripes and a black blazer with red trim.

==== Melville College ====
Melville College was founded as The Edinburgh Institution for Languages and Mathematics by Rev. Robert Cunningham in 1832. Unusually for the time, the school placed it's teaching emphasis on then-modern subjects, such as science, rather than classical subjects. Initially located on George Street, the school moved to Hill Street, and then to 8 Queen Street, which was purchased in 1853. In 1920, the Institution moved again to Melville Street, in the city's West End, after which it was renamed in 1936 to Melville College. About the same time, the school's caps and blazers were changed to bright red.

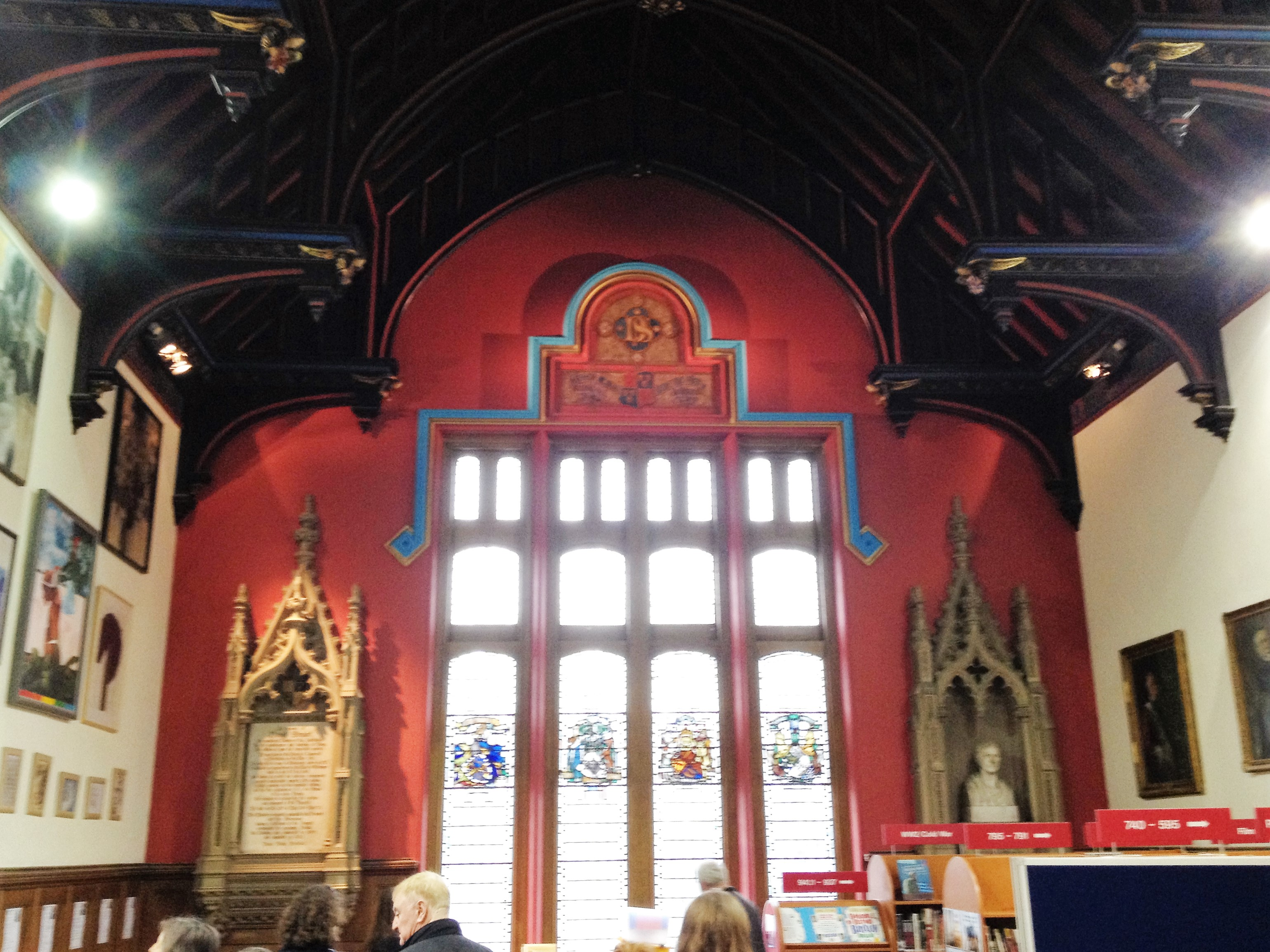
Senior School Library.

==== Merger ====
In 1972, the two schools merged to become Daniel Stewart's and Melville College - later shortened to Stewart's Melville College.

Following the merger, the Colleges' uniforms were amalgamated; Melville College's bright red trim replaced the Daniel Stewart's College blazers' dark red trim for general use, whilst the red blazer of Melville College was adopted for those awarded colours (e.g. for sporting and other achievements). Later the red blazer was limited to the head boy and his deputies, with colours being signified with a particular tie.

=== Erskine Stewart Melville Schools ===
Erskine Stewart's Melville Schools (ESMS) was formed in 1977 through the Merchant Company's consolidation of The Mary Erskine School and Stewart's Melville College. Whilst the senior schools retained their distinct identities, a coeducational nursery and junior school was formed, with Nursery to Primary 3 housed on Mary Erskine's Ravelston campus, and Primary 4 to 7 on Stewart's Melville's Comely Bank campus. The two campuses lie approximately one mile (two km) apart. A combined, coeducatioaln sixth form was also founded, with teaching split across both sites.

In 2013, Stewart's Melville was voted the Scottish Independent School of the year by the Sunday Times newspaper and Mary Erskine School was voted the Scottish Independent School of the year in 2012.

In 2014, the combined Erskine Stewarts Melville Schools, with over 2,700 pupils, claimed to be the largest independent school in Europe. In the same year, a programme of improvement work on buildings of the junior school was announced, with work beginning in 2018.

In February 2023, it was announced by principal Anthony Simpson that the boarding house would close by July 2025, citing costs and the facility not being compatible with the school's vision for the future. The allocation of resources towards the boarding house was not sustainable, as at the time of the announcement, there were only 19 boarders, accounting for less than 3% of all pupils at the school.

=== Erskine Stewart Melville ===
It was announced in October 2024 that Stewarts Melville will undergo a merger with its sister school, Mary Erskine, in the beginning of the 2026/2027 academic year and the combined school would be called Erskine Stewart Melville (ESM). The school stated that it would create a more inclusive community and it would also be more financially efficient.

== Academics ==
=== Examinations ===
Erskine Stewart Meville pupils predominantly sit for Qualifications Scotland (QS) examinations, including National 5, Higher and Advanced Higher papers. English GCE Advanced Level examinations can also be sat in art, product design, and music.

In 2014 and 2016, Mary Erskine's was top of the Sunday Times list of independent secondary schools in Scotland using the Scottish Examinations system and in 2015 was judged the best Scottish School by Advanced Highers by Best-Schools. In 2025, it was reported that 91% of National 5 results at the school achieved levels A or B and 89% of Higher Grade results were also at levels A or B.

=== Destinations ===
Almost all leavers were planning to go on to higher education. In 2025 Which School Advisor reported that typically 60% of students go on to study in Scottish universities, 30% to English, Northern Irish or Welsh universities and some to North American Universities.

== Sport ==
The school is involved in a wide variety of sports, most of which are coached by mixture of staff from general departments as well as the Physical Education (PE) department staff. Sports include Aerobics, Athletics, Badminton, Basketball, Cricket, Cross-country, Curling, Dance, Equestrian, Fencing, Football, Golf, ice skating, Highland Dancing, Hockey, Sailing, Skiing, Squash, Swimming, Tennis and Volleyball.

=== Facilities ===
Ravelston Sports Club is a large on-site sports centre and gym opened in 2000 and is split across both campuses. The sports centre is mainly used by pupils for physical education lessons and sports training (such as swimming, basketball, badminton, short tennis and table tennis) but is also open to members of the public for a monthly membership fee. There is also a school shooting range located at the Ravelston campus.

Extensive rugby, cricket, hockey pitches and athletics facilities are also located at the school's sports grounds in Inverleith, two miles north of the school. The main stadium at Inverleith dates back to the 1890s and was the main ground of the Scotland national rugby union team until 1925.

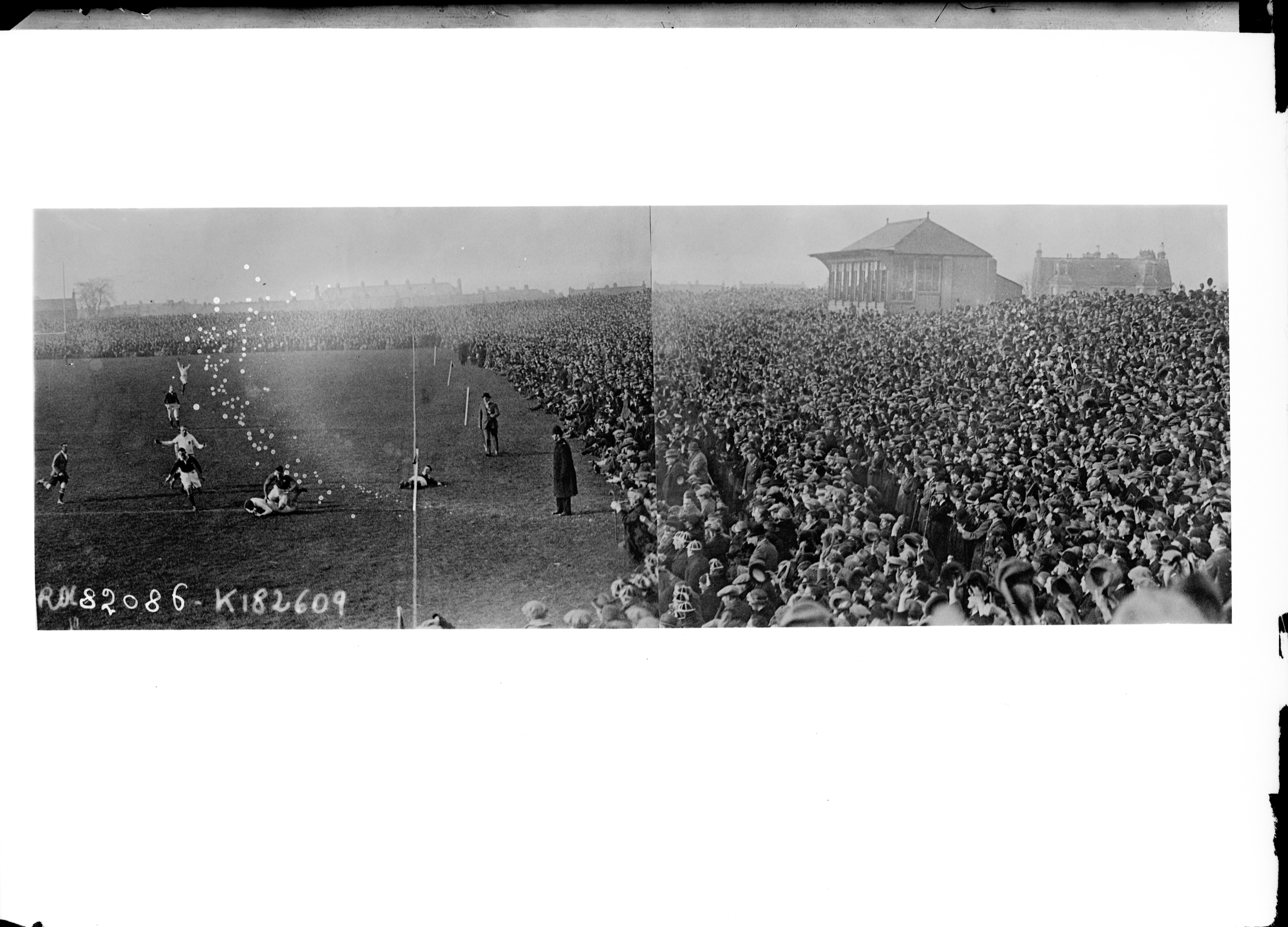
Scotland vs. France at Inverleith Playing Fields, 1923

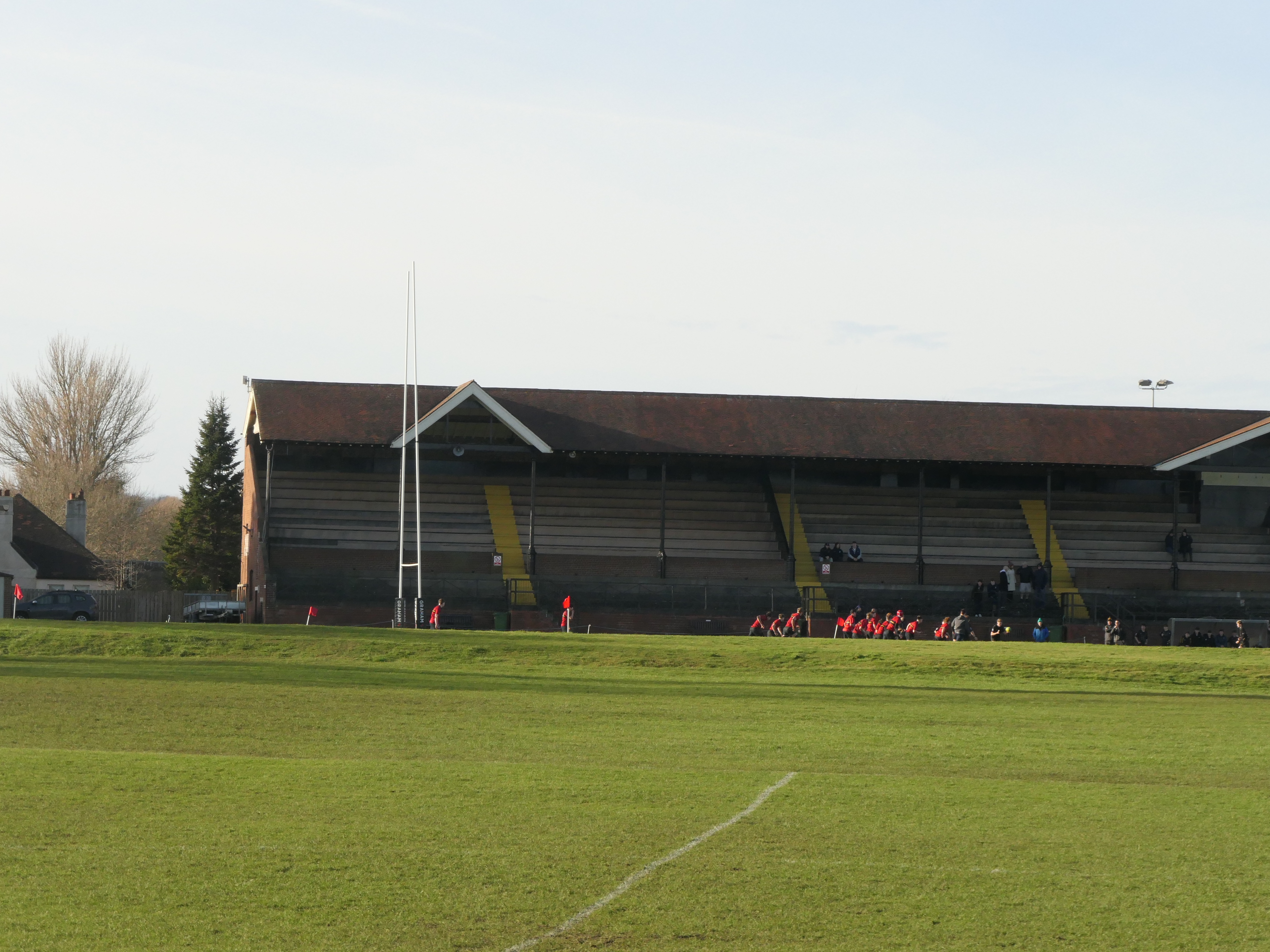
Main Stadium, Inverleith Playing Fields

=== Rugby ===
Stewart's Melville College has won the Scottish Rugby Schools Under 18 Cup six times; in 1999 (in their first year of entering), 2006, 2011, 2016, 2019 and most recently in 2024.

Stewart's Melville RFC, the successor to the school's Former Pupils' Rugby Club, was founded in 1973, following the merger of Daniel Stewart's College and Melville College. The club currently plays in Division 2 of the Scottish League Championship.

=== Hockey ===
Erskine Stewart Melville fields both boys' and girls' hockey teams during the winter term. Since at least 2007, the girls' program has been noted for excelling in hockey, with over six teams competing at senior level and many pupils playing at National level.

Erskine Stewart's Melville Hockey Club, the school's Former Pupils' Hockey Club, was founded in 1987.

=== Football ===
Stewart’s Melville College won the Scottish Independent Schools (SISFA) in 2025. At the Indodrill Stadium in a 4-1 victory over St Aloysius College

=== Golf ===
Stewart's Meville College Former Pupils' Golf Club was founded in 1887 and is based at Murrayfield Golf Club.

== Arts ==
=== Music and drama ===
Almost 800 children sing regularly in choirs performing in all kinds of venues from the Usher Hall to St Peter's in the Vatican, from Songs of Praise to sharing the stage with the Scottish Chamber Orchestra.

The Junior School had provided the choir to the annual Royal Edinburgh Military Tattoo since 2013.

In addition to this 300 children from Primary 4 to senior sixth Form play in school orchestras and bands (including Pipe Band and Jazz Band).

Boys and girls from the Junior School have had favourable reviews while performing over 680 times in professional West End touring musicals including over 220 appearances in Joseph and the Amazing Technicolor Dreamcoat. Senior pupils have won prestigious scholarships to American Drama Schools and starred on TV.

==== Tom Fleming Centre ====
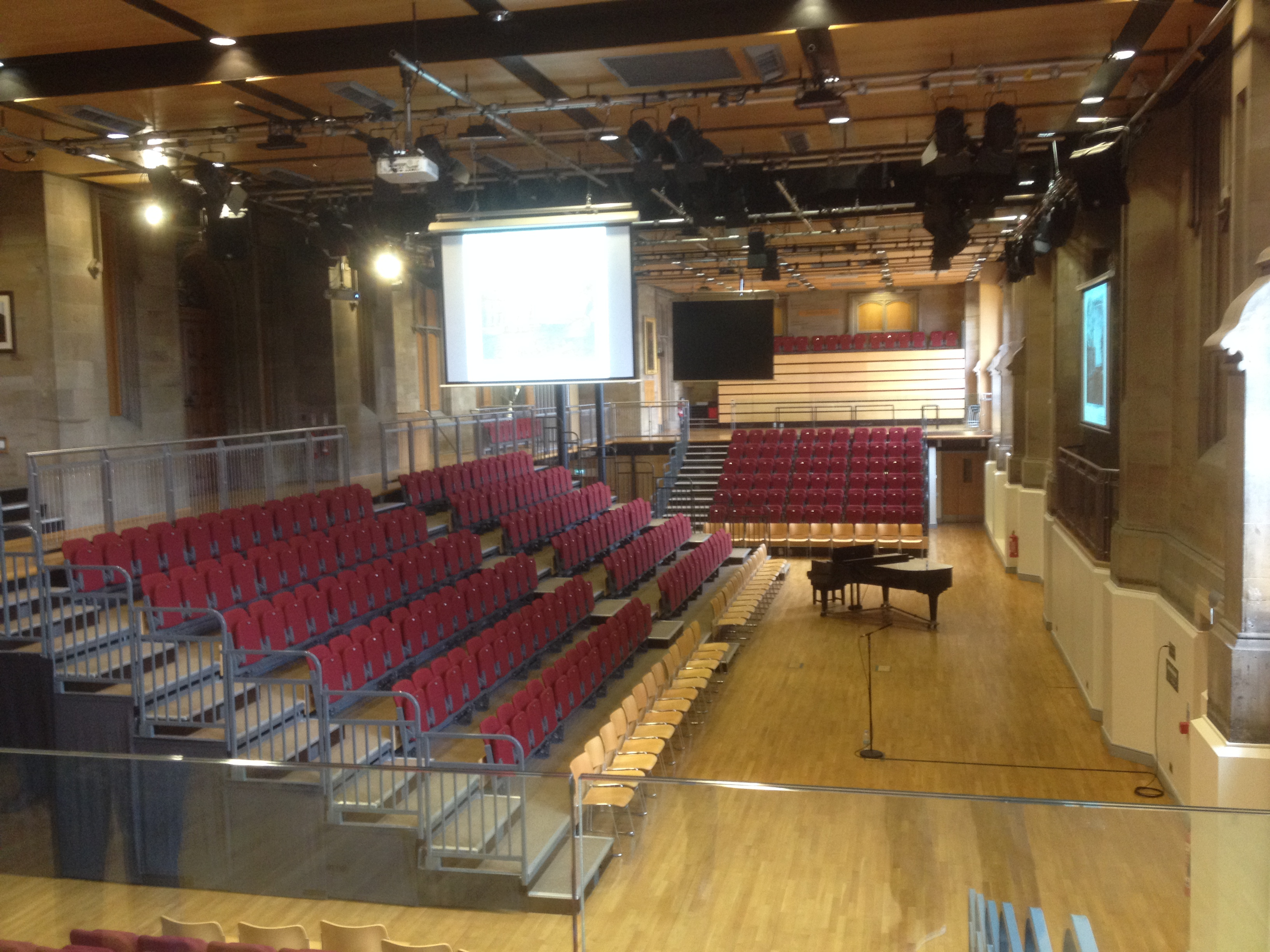
Tom Fleming Centre for Performing Arts in 2015

Between 2005-07, the school's Victorian assembly hall, built within the Old College's former courtyard, was converted into an 800-seat performing arts centre. Retractable seating provides a variety of possible configurations It is available for use by the public and is used as a venue during the Edinburgh Festival Fringe. The £3.5 million project, was part-funded by donations by current parents and former pupils.

In 2011, actor John Cairney unveiled the new name for the centre, the Tom Fleming Centre for Performing Arts, named after former pupil Tom Fleming, one of Scotland's leading broadcasters.

== Culture ==
The school is non-denominational but claims to have a broadly Christian outlook.

=== Carbisdale ===
Since 1965, the school organised an outdoor education programme for the boys of SMC and the girls from MES in the third year. It took place in the north of Scotland, based for over forty years at Carbisdale Castle Youth Hostel, Easter Ross, until its closure in 2011 required accommodation to relocate to Aviemore. The camp was also abandoned in 2020 and 2021, due to coronavirus restrictions. It returned in 2022; however later in 2022, Carbisdale Castle was sold and is now a private residence.

Since 1965, the school has organised an outdoor education programme for the boys of SMC and the girls from MES in the third senior year. It is located in the north of Scotland at Carbisdale Castle, a historic castle which has been converted into a Youth Hostel. The trip consists of a number of outdoor activities that vary from year to year including hillwalking, orienteering, golf, kayaking, team-building activities, visits to nearby historic sites and environmental studies of the surrounding woodland. Carbisdale Castle has a plaque of the Stewart's Melville College badge in its foyer above the main door.

Engcongolweni is a village in Northern Malawi and it is the home to the unusually named "Edinburgh Girls’ High School". It is a secondary school for about 150 girls (in about 2016). The name of the school is a nod towards the Mary Erskine School as the schools are partners and the school plans to visit Malawi every two years.

=== School uniform and colours ===
In 1994 the school adopted a uniform which included a navy blue and red kilt designed by the company Kinloch Anderson, a blue blazer, white blouse and red tie. Colours and half-colours could be awarded in Sixth Form to pupils who excel in non-academic areas (such as music, drama and individual sports).

In 2026, after the merger into Erskine Stewart Melville, primary and secondary students will use a blue blazer with a red trim while sixth form students will use a red blazer.

In 2026 the uniform of the combined Erskine Stewart Melville school became a dark blue blazer with red trim for primary and secondary students and a red blazer for sixth form students.

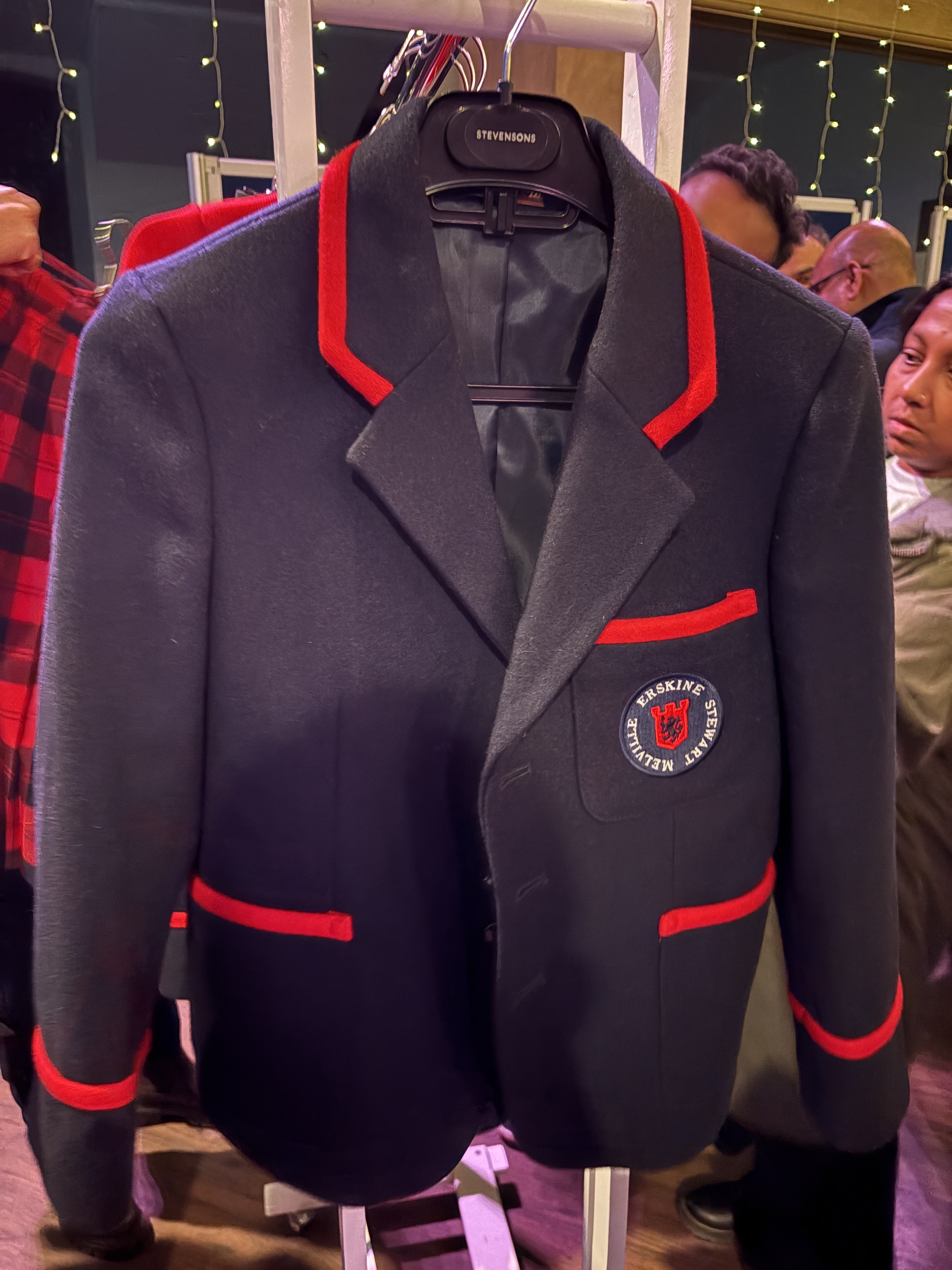
Erskine Stewart Melville blazer.

=== Former Pupils Guild ===
Upon leaving MES, students have the opportunity to join the Mary Erskine Former Pupils Guild which was founded in 1884.

=== Senior sixth form ===
When pupils enter the sixth (final) form they are merged with the boys from Stewart's Melville College. Classes take place at both school sites, with buses operating regularly to transfer students between the two. There are approximately 240 students in a normal year group.

In sixth form students are largely independent. Students have a tutor (twinned with another at the other site) with whom they register in the morning, and who also helps them with their British university UCAS applications.

All members of the sixth form are prefects and are expected to help out with duties around the school sites. The maintenance of the prefect body is the responsibility of a Head Boy and a Head Girl, along with five deputy head boys and five deputy head girls.

== Erskine Stewart Melville Junior School ==
Erskine Stewart Melville (ESM) is an independent nursery and junior day school located in Edinburgh, Scotland managed by the Merchant Company of Edinburgh.

Erskine Stewart Melville Junior School

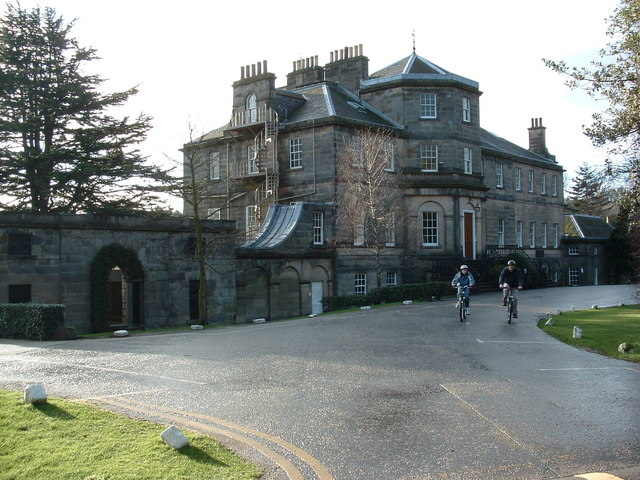

Location
- Ravelston, Murrayfield; Edinburgh, EH4 3NG; Scotland

Information
- Type: Independent Nursery & Junior Day School
- Motto: Mitis et fortis
- Established: 1694; 332 years ago (as Merchant Maiden Hospital)
- Chair of Governing Council: Katie Ridland
- Principal: Anthony Simpson
- Head: Mike Kane
- Gender: Coeducational
- Age: 4 to 11
- Website: https://www.erskinestewartmelville.com/

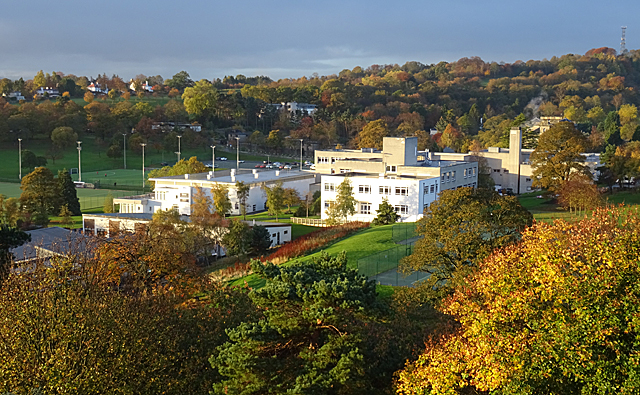
The Junior School Campus, Ravelston, [[Murrayfield]]

== Notable former staff ==
- Elisabeth West in 1708, diarist

== Former Headmasters ==
- Herbert James Liddle Robbie (1904–1964), headmaster of Daniel Stewart's from 1946 to 1964

== Notable alumni ==
The school maintains a Former Pupils Club, which organises social events throughout the year. There are branches throughout the UK and abroad.

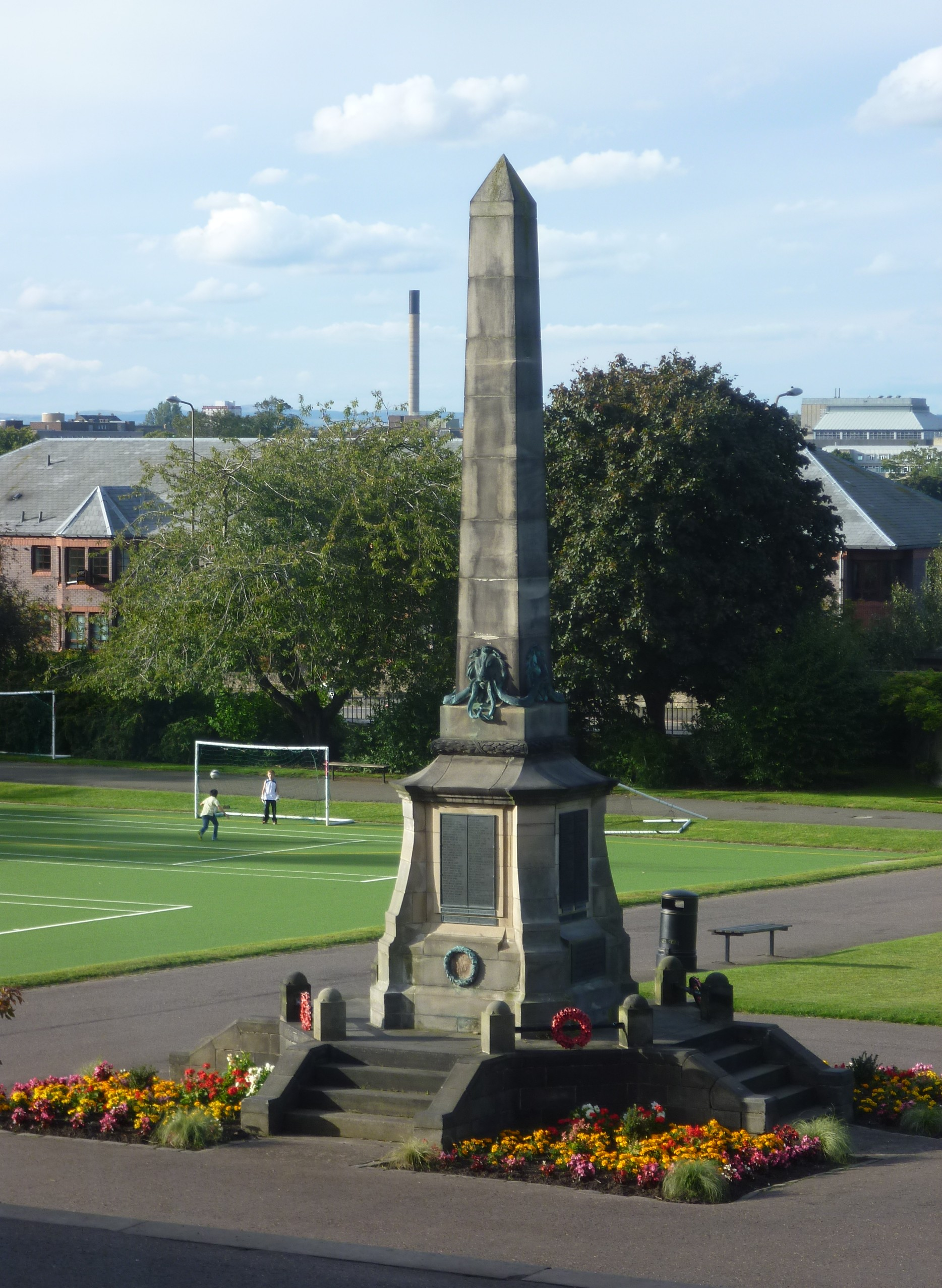
War Memorial in the college grounds

Academia and science

- Thomas David Anderson (1853–1952), astronomer who discovered many temporary and variable stars (novae)
- Professor James Barr (1924–2006), a radical theologian who was professor at Montreal, Edinburgh, Manchester, Oxford, Princeton and Vanderbilt
- James Bertram (Carnegie secretary) (1872–1934)
- Erskine Beveridge (1851–1920), textile manufacturer, historian and antiquary
- Professor Henry Calderwood (1830–1897), Professor of Moral Philosophy at Edinburgh University and Fellow of the Royal Society of Edinburgh
- James Ireland Craig (1868–1952), meteorologist (dux 1885)
- Professor Maurice Ewing (1912–1999), First professor of surgery at Melbourne University, Australia
- Sir William Tennant Gairdner (1824–1907), Professor of Medicine at the University of Glasgow and President of the British Medical Association
- Maria Gordon, (1864–1939), geologist and palaeontologist, first woman to get a DSc from London University and a PhD from LMU Munich
- William Aitcheson Haswell (1854–1925), Scottish-Australian zoologist specialising in crustaceans, winner of the 1915 Clarke Medal
- Andrew John Herbertson (1865–1915), geographer and Professor in Geography at Oxford University
- Ellen Charlotte Higgins (1871–1951), principal of the Royal Holloway College, University of London
- Isabel Emslie Hutton (1887–1960), physician
- Sir James Charles Inglis (1851–1911), British civil engineer, President of the Institution of Civil Engineers and General Manager of the Great Western Railway
- Professor Tom W. B. Kibble (1932–2016), theoretical physicist, co-discovery of the Higgs mechanism and Higgs boson
- Sir Peter Redford Scott Lang – Regius Professor of Mathematics at St Andrews University
- Sheila Scott Macintyre (1910–1960), mathematician best known for her work on the Whittaker constant
- Anna MacGillivray Macleod (1917–2004), first female professor of Brewing and Biochemistry in the world
- Elizabeth Malloch (1910–2000), educator and priest
- Professor Arnold Maran (1936–2017), surgeon, President of the Royal College of Surgeons of Edinburgh
- George McGavin (born 1954), entomologist
- Annie Hutton Numbers (1897–1988), British mathematician and chemist
- Ishobel Ross (1890–1965), Scottish World War I nurse and diarist
- Winifred Rushforth (1885–1983), Jungian psychoanalyst
- John Smith (1825–1910), dentist who founded the Royal Hospital for Sick Children, Edinburgh and was Surgeon Dentist to Queen Victoria
- Sir Fraser Stoddart (1942–2024), chemist, Nobel Prize in Chemistry 2016, Professor of chemistry at Northwestern University, USA (supramolecular chemistry and nanotechnology), awarded Albert Einstein World Award of Science
- Sir John Thomson-Walker (1871–1937), Hunterian Professor of Surgery at the Royal College of Surgeons of England and leading surgeon in the field of urology
- Ramsay Traquair (1840–1912), naturalist and palaeontologist, leading expert on fossil fish, awarded the Royal Medal by the Royal Society and the Lyell Medal

Media and arts

- Ian Stuart Black (1915–1997), novelist, playwright and screenwriter
- Michael Boyd (director) (born 1955), Artistic Director of the Royal Shakespeare Company
- Tom Fleming (1927–2010), actor and television commentator
- Sir William Russell Flint (1880–1969), watercolour painter and president of the Royal Society of Painters in Watercolours
- Stuart Henry (1942–1995), popular radio disc jockey of the 1960s and 70s
- Philip Kerr (1956–2018), writer
- Alexander Moffat (born 1943), artist, Head of Painting, Glasgow School of Art
- Catherine Grant Furley Smith (1858–1944), poet, journalist, novelist
- Lynda Cochrane, pianist
- Margaret Stirling Dobson, painter, printmaker and author
- Joanna Drew (1929–2003), art gallery director and arts administrator
- Jenny Foulds, actress, e.g. Two Thousand Acres of Sky)
- Alison Geissler (1907–2011), glass engraver
- Frances Grey, actress
- Dorothy Mackie Low (1916–2002), writer of romance novels who used the pseudonyms Dorothy Mackie Low, Lois Paxton, and Zoë Cass
- Freya Mavor, actress
- Chloe Pirrie, actress
- Margaret Stoddart (1865–1934), notable New Zealand artist
- Sylvia Whitman, proprietor of Shakespeare and Company
- Madeleine Worrall, actress

Law and politics

- Lord Brailsford (S. Neil Brailsford) (born 1954), Senator of the College of Justice and Supreme Courts Judge
- Sir Martin Chamberlain (born 1973), a High Court Judge of England and Wales
- Sir William Young Darling (1885–1962), Member of Parliament for South Edinburgh and Lord Provost of Edinburgh
- Sir Andrew Henderson Leith Fraser (1848–1919), Lieutenant Governor of Bengal between 1903 and 1908
- Sir James Gibson, 1st Baronet (1849–1912), Lord Provost of Edinburgh and Member of Parliament for Edinburgh East
- Adam Gifford, Lord Gifford (1820–1887), Scottish Advocate and Judge
- Robert McIntyre (1913–1998), politician, leader of the Scottish National Party (SNP) and the SNP's first elected Member of Parliament
- J P Mackintosh (1929–1978), academic and British Labour politician of the 1960s and 70s. Leading advocate of Scottish devolution
- Sir Thomas Brash Morison (1868–1945), Liberal Member of Parliament for Inverness, Solicitor General for Scotland, Privy Counsellor and Lord Advocate
- Sir George Touche 1st Baronet (1861–1935), Conservative Member of Parliament and founder of one of the firms that created Deloitte Touche Tohmatsu
- Sir James Wilson (1849–1929), New Zealand Politician
- Paul Wheelhouse (born 1970), SNP MSP for South Scotland, Minister for Business, Innovation and Energy in the Scottish Government
- Daniel Johnson (born 1977), Entrepreneur and Labour MSP for Edinburgh Southern
- Louise Mary Eates (married name), suffragette
- Elaine Murray, MSP

Sports

- Finlay Calder (born 1957), international rugby player and British and Irish Lions captain who appeared 34 times for Scotland
- Jim Calder (born 1957), Scottish and British Lions rugby player who appeared 27 times for Scotland
- Grant Forrest (born 1993), European Tour Professional Golfer and Member of the 2015 Walker Cup Team
- David Florence (born 1982), Olympic canoeing silver medallist and world champion
- Dario Franchitti (born 1973), professional racing-car driver who won the Indianapolis 500 race three times
- William Laidlaw (1912–1992), international cricketer for Scotland and Durham
- John Lisle Hall MacFarlane (1851–1874), international rugby player and surgeon, who played for Scotland in the first international rugby match in 1871
- Donald MacGregor (born 1939), Olympic marathon runner
- Finlay Mickel (born 1977), Olympic skier, whose result at the 2005 World Championships was the best result by a British man in the history of the skiing World Championships
- Arthur Plowright (1913–1992), first-class cricketer
- Charles Scobie (1895–1965), first-class cricketer
- Jamie Stevenson (born 1975), world champion orienteer
- William Turnbull (1879–1959), first-class cricketer
- Grant Weatherstone (1931–2020), international rugby player who was played 16 times for Scotland
- Doddie Weir (1970–2022), Scottish and British Lions international rugby player who played 61 times for Scotland. Charity fundraiser for MND research
- Jake Wightman (born 1994), International athlete. Gold medallist 1500 metres 2022 World Athletics Championships
- David Wilkie (1954–2024), only person to have been swimming champion at British, American, Commonwealth, European, World and Olympic levels at the same time
- Shauna Mullin, athlete, 2012 Olympic Games, Beach Volleyball
- Janice Rankin, Olympic Gold Medallist for curling 2002
- Lynsey Sharp, athlete, 2012 European Champion 800m, 2012 Olympic semi-finalist 800m, 2014 Commonwealth silver medallist

Military

- Sir Robert Neil Campbell (1854–1928), a physician who commanded the Bengal Medical Service
- Lieutenant General Sir James Hills-Johnes (1833–1919), who was awarded the Victoria Cross for action in Delhi in the Indian mutiny in 1857
- John Alexander Cruickshank (born 1920), recipient of the Victoria Cross in the Second World War
- Major-General Mungo Melvin (born 1955), retired British Army officer and military historian

Religion

- Reverend James A. Whyte (1920–2005), leading theologian, Professor at St. Andrews University and Moderator of the General Assembly of the Church of Scotland
- Reverend Ronnie Selby Wright (1908–1995), chaplain to the Queen, Moderator of the General Assembly of the Church of Scotland

Other

- Sir Ivison Macadam (1894–1974), Director General of the Royal Institute of International Affairs (Chatham House) and founding president of the National Union of Students
- Sir Robert Hogg Matthew (1906–1975), acclaimed architect and a leading proponent of modernism
- Judy Wagner, British business leader, educator and executive search recruitment manager

== Sources ==
- Roberts, Alasdair (2007). Crème de la Crème, Girls' Schools of Edinburgh. 91 Brick Lane, London, W1 6QL, U.K.: Steve Savage Publishers. ISBN 978-1-904246-20-6.
