= List of listed buildings in Edinburgh/33 =

This is a list of listed buildings in Edinburgh, Scotland.

== List ==
Name	Location	Date Listed	Grid Ref. (Note: Sometimes known as OSGB36, the grid reference (where provided) is based on the British national grid reference system used by the Ordnance Survey. • "Guide to National Grid". Ordnance Survey. • "Get-a-map". Ordnance Survey.)	Geo-coordinates	Notes	LB Number (Note: Historic Environment Scotland assign a unique alphanumeric identifier to each designated site in Scotland, for listed buildings this always begins with "LB", for example "LB12345".)	Image
1-4 (Inclusive Numbers) Abbey Mount And 2 Montrose Terrace				55°57′23″N 3°10′19″W	Category C(S)	49048	Upload another image
9, 10, 11 And 12 Comely Green Place With Boundary Wall And Railings				55°57′24″N 3°09′57″W	Category B	49051	Upload Photo
Napier Road And Spylaw Road, Walls And Gatepiers Of Former Rockville House (1-18 The Limes)				55°56′00″N 3°13′01″W	Category B	49358	Upload another image
Holyrood Park, Dumbiedykes Lodge				55°56′52″N 3°10′40″W	Category C(S)	49510	Upload Photo
Holyrood Park, St Leonard's Fountain				55°56′31″N 3°10′16″W	Category C(S)	49514	Upload another image See more images
65 Bonaly Road, The Cottage (Former Coach House And Stables) At Bonaly Tower, With Garden Statuary				55°53′50″N 3°15′31″W	Category C(S)	49548	Upload Photo
Colinton Road, Merchiston Castle School, Main School Building				55°54′43″N 3°15′13″W	Category B	49558	Upload Photo
Colinton Road, Merchiston Castle School, Rogerson House				55°54′45″N 3°15′11″W	Category B	49559	Upload Photo
17 Southfield Farm Grove, Southfield Farm				55°56′42″N 3°07′57″W	Category B	49626	Upload Photo
7 Carlton Terrace Including Railings And Boundary Walls				55°57′22″N 3°10′25″W	Category A	49749	Upload Photo
10 Carlton Terrace Including Railings And Boundary Walls				55°57′23″N 3°10′25″W	Category A	49752	Upload Photo
14 Carlton Terrace Including Railings And Boundary Walls				55°57′24″N 3°10′27″W	Category A	49756	Upload another image
3 Regent Terrace Including Railings And Boundary Walls				55°57′15″N 3°10′41″W	Category A	49766	Upload another image
4 Regent Terrace Including Railings And Boundary Walls				55°57′15″N 3°10′40″W	Category A	49767	Upload Photo
24 Regent Terrace, Including Railings And Boundary Walls				55°57′19″N 3°10′32″W	Category A	49787	Upload another image
7 Royal Terrace Including Railings And Boundary Walls				55°57′24″N 3°10′49″W	Category A	49805	Upload Photo
29 Royal Terrace Including Railings And Boundary Walls				55°57′24″N 3°10′37″W	Category A	49820	Upload another image
34 Royal Terrace Including Railings And Boundary Walls				55°57′24″N 3°10′35″W	Category A	49826	Upload Photo
40 Royal Terrace Including Railings And Boundary Walls				55°57′24″N 3°10′31″W	Category A	49832	Upload another image
32 George Square, University Of Edinburgh, Arts Faculty, George Square Theatre (Block E)				55°56′34″N 3°11′17″W	Category B	50190	Upload another image
36 George Square, University Of Edinburgh, Arts Faculty, Adam Ferguson (Block D)				55°56′35″N 3°11′15″W	Category B	50188	Upload Photo
15, 15B And 15C Dalkeith Road, Scottish Widows Fund And Life Assurance Society Head Office, Including Landscaping, Moat And Boundary Walls				55°56′25″N 3°10′28″W	Category A	50213	Upload Photo
Shore Road, Port Edgar, Power Station				55°59′32″N 3°24′37″W	Category C(S)	50856	Upload Photo
Comiston Springs Water House Off Oxgangs Loan And Fox Spring Crescent				55°54′39″N 3°13′04″W	Category B	27963	Upload another image
Craigleith Road, Royal Victoria Hospital, Administration Block				55°57′33″N 3°13′54″W	Category B	51008	Upload Photo
301-319 (Odd Nos) Cowgate And 1 And 2 High School Yards, Including Steps To East				55°56′56″N 3°11′03″W	Category B	51174	Upload another image
64 Princes Street, British Home Stores				55°57′09″N 3°11′44″W	Category B	51249	Upload Photo
8 Sunbury Mews And 3 Sunbury Street				55°57′05″N 3°13′12″W	Category C(S)	51344	Upload Photo
42 Pennywell Gardens, Muirhouse St Andrews Parish Church And Halls (Church Of Scotland)				55°58′21″N 3°15′28″W	Category C(S)	51748	Upload Photo

== Key ==
The scheme for classifying buildings in Scotland is:

- Category A: "buildings of national or international importance, either architectural or historic; or fine, little-altered examples of some particular period, style or building type."
- Category B: "buildings of regional or more than local importance; or major examples of some particular period, style or building type, which may have been altered."
- Category C: "buildings of local importance; lesser examples of any period, style, or building type, as originally constructed or moderately altered; and simple traditional buildings which group well with other listed buildings."

In March 2016 there were 47,288 listed buildings in Scotland. Of these, 8% were Category A, and 50% were Category B, with the remaining 42% being Category C.

== See also ==
- List of listed buildings in Edinburgh
