= Newburn (disambiguation) =

Newburn may refer to:

== People ==
- Harry K. Newburn (1906-1974), American educator and universities administrator
- Thomas Newburn (1918-2003), Irish first-class cricketer
- Tim Newburn (born in 1959), British academic, specialising in criminology

== Place ==
=== Australia ===
- Newburn, former area or Perth, now Perth Airport

=== United Kingdom ===
- Newburn, civil parish of Newcastle upon Tyne
- Newburn, civil parish of Fife in Scotland

== Other ==
- (2955) Newburn, minor planet of the asteroid belt
