= Maurice Ewing (surgeon) =

Scottish surgeon

Maurice Rossie Ewing CBE FRCSEd, FRCS, FRACS
- Born: 6 July 1912; Leith, Scotland
- Died: 24 June 1999 (aged 86)
- Education: Daniel Stewart's College, Edinburgh; University of Edinburgh
- Occupation: Professor of surgery
- Known for: Renal transplantation. Head and neck cancer surgery
- Medical career
- Institutions: University of Melbourne

Maurice Rossie Ewing (6 July 1912 – 24 June 1999) was a Scottish surgeon who was the first professor of surgery at the University of Melbourne, Australia. His department established an early programme of renal transplantation in Australia.

== Early life and education ==
He was born on 6 July 1912 at 53 Dudley Crescent, Leith, the youngest of the four sons of Annabel (née Rossie) and Thomas Miller Ewing, master mariner and a captain with the Northern Lighthouse Board. He was educated at Daniel Stewart's College, Edinburgh where he was captain and dux of the school and a member of the school rugby 1st XV. He won the Creighton scholarship to University of Edinburgh Medical School and qualified with an MB ChB in 1935, winning the Ettles scholarship as the most distinguished scholar of his year, and the Mouan scholarship in the practice of physic.

== Medical career ==
He was house surgeon to Sir David Wilkie in the Royal Infirmary of Edinburgh. After surgical posts at Royal Leicester Infirmary he returned to Edinburgh as a demonstrator in anatomy and physiology. After obtaining the FRCSEd in 1939, he was appointed surgeon to the Surgical Outpatient Department of the Royal Infirmary of Edinburgh. During World War II he served as a Surgeon Lieutenant in the Royal Naval Volunteer Reserve, based at the naval hospital in Bighi, Malta.

From 1947 he worked with Professor Ian Aird as senior lecturer at the Postgraduate Medical School at Hammersmith Hospital. During his time in London he was a Hunterian lecturer and won a travelling fellowship to Scandinavia. He was awarded a British Empire fellowship to Memorial Hospital, New York, where he worked with the leading head and neck surgeon Dr Hayes Marti n.

In 1955 he was appointed as first occupant of the new James Stewart chair of surgery at University of Melbourne. The chair which he took in Melbourne was based at the Alfred Hospital, then the Royal Melbourne Hospital, with the establishment of Monash University. He was also responsible for surgical teaching at St Vincent's Hospital and Prince Henry's Hospital.

At the Royal Melbourne he established a renal transplant program under the direction of the nephrologists Professor Priscilla Kincaid-Smith and Dr Vernon Marshall. Peter Morris set up a tissue typing laboratory and a research laboratory in transplantation immunology in Ewing's department to support this service. Ewing's s other clinical interests were in head and neck cancer, parenteral nutrition and peripheral vascular disease. He also introduced the practice of using sheepskins under the patient to reduce the incidence of pressure sores. He was active in promoting seatbelt legislation. The wearing of seatbelts in cars was made compulsory in the State of Victoria in 1970, a world first.

He retired in 1977 and was appointed a CBE in that year.

Following retirement from the University of Melbourne, he spent six months in Kuala Lumpur developing the academic surgical unit of the University of Malaya.

== Personal life ==
Ewing married Phyllis Edith Parnall, whom he had met in Malta where she was a Volunteer Air Detachment nurse. They had one daughter, Sarah, and two sons Hamish and Alastair.
