= Thomas Newburn =

Irish cricketer

Personal information
- Full name: Thomas Newburn
- Born: 10 August 1918; Belfast, Ireland
- Died: 26 July 2003 (aged 84); Belfast, Northern Ireland
- Batting: Right-handed
- Bowling: Right-arm fast-medium

Domestic team information
- Years: Team
- 1949: Ireland

Career statistics
Competition	First-class
Matches	1
Runs scored	12
Batting average	6.00
100s/50s	–/–
Top score	8
Balls bowled	168
Wickets	3
Bowling average	10.33
5 wickets in innings	–
10 wickets in match	–
Best bowling	3/23
Catches/stumpings	1/–
- Source: Cricinfo, 22 October 2018

Thomas Newburn (10 August 1918 – 26 July 2003) was an Irish first-class cricketer.

Newburn was born at Belfast and played his early club cricket for the Central Presbyterian Association Cricket Club. He made one appearance in first-class cricket for Ireland against Scotland at Belfast in 1949. Batting twice during the match, Newburn was dismissed in Ireland's first-innings for 8 runs by George Youngson, while in their second-innings he was dismissed for 4 runs by William Edward. He took also took three wickets in the match, dismissing James Taylor, William Laidlaw and Robert McLaren in Scotland's second-innings. He later played his club cricket for Woodvale. He died at Belfast in July 2003.
