= Mike Pringle (politician) =

British politician (born 1945)

Member of the Scottish Parliament for Edinburgh South
- In office 1 May 2003 – 22 March 2011
- Preceded by: Angus MacKay
- Succeeded by: Constituency abolished

Personal details
- Born: 25 December 1945 (age 80) Northern Rhodesia
- Party: Scottish Liberal Democrats

Mike Pringle (born 25 December 1945) is a Scottish Liberal Democrat politician. He was the Member of the Scottish Parliament (MSP) for Edinburgh South from 2003 to 2011.

== Background ==
He was born in Northern Rhodesia (modern-day Zambia), and educated at Edinburgh Academy. He is a keen follower of Heart of Midlothian F.C. and was a strong supporter of the campaign to prevent the sale of the club's Tynecastle stadium in 2004. He is a strong supporter of the Free Tibet Campaign and has introduced a Bill into the Scottish Parliament to introduce a levy on plastic bags in Scotland similar to the successful Irish plastic bag tax. He has been an Honorary Vice-president of English-Speaking Union Scotland.

== Political career ==
From 1992 to 2003 he was a member of the City of Edinburgh Council. In the 1997 UK general election he ran unsuccessfully as a candidate in Edinburgh South, and in the equivalent constituency in the 1999 Scottish Parliament election. In the latter he came third out of the five candidates, with 22% of the vote; less than five hundred votes behind Margo MacDonald. He was also a candidate for the Lothians, but was not elected through the list system.

He ran again in the 2003 Scottish Parliamentary election for Edinburgh South, winning it from Angus MacKay by half a per cent of the votes – a majority of 158. He served on the Justice Committees of the Scottish Parliament.

In September 2006, the Scottish Parliament's Standards Committee banned him for a week from attending full sessions and committee meetings of the Parliament for leaking details of the Shirley McKie case to a newspaper.

He was re-elected in the 2007 Scottish Parliament election.

He lost the redrawn seat of Edinburgh Southern to the SNP's Jim Eadie in the 2011 Scottish Parliament election.

Scottish Parliament
Preceded by Angus MacKay	Member of the Scottish Parliament for Edinburgh South; 2003–2011	Constituency abolished see Edinburgh Southern
