= Jim Eadie (politician) =

Scottish National Party politician

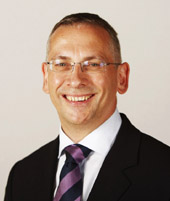

Member of the Scottish Parliament for Edinburgh Southern
- In office 5 May 2011 – 24 March 2016
- Preceded by: Mike Pringle
- Succeeded by: Daniel Johnson

Personal details
- Born: 10 February 1968 (age 58) Glasgow, Scotland
- Party: Alba Party (2021–2026)
- Other political affiliations: Scottish National Party (until 2021)
- Education: University of Strathclyde

Jim Eadie (born 10 February 1968) is a Scottish politician who was the Scottish National Party (SNP) Member of the Scottish Parliament (MSP) for the Edinburgh Southern constituency from 2011 to 2016. In 2021, he left the SNP and joined the Alba Party.

== Early life ==
Eadie was born on 10 February 1968 in Glasgow, Scotland. He was educated at Waverley Secondary School (Drumchapel) and the University of Strathclyde.

Eadie worked for the Royal College of Nursing and Scottish Television, before becoming head of the Scottish branch of the Association of the British Pharmaceutical Industry (ABPI) in 2002. He left the ABPI in 2007 to start a healthcare consulting business.

== Political career ==
=== Member of the Scottish Parliament ===
Eadie contested the seat of Edinburgh Southern in the 2011 Scottish Parliament election, and defeated the Liberal Democrat incumbent Mike Pringle by a narrow margin of 693 votes. In the same election, he was the eleventh list candidate for the SNP in the Lothian region.

Eadie was one of seven LGBT MSPs during the 4th Scottish Parliament.

He was Convener of the Infrastructure and Capital Investment Committee 2014–16.

He stood again in the Edinburgh Southern seat in 2016, but lost his seat to Daniel Johnson of Scottish Labour.

=== Extra-parliamentary activity ===
He was selected to stand in the Edinburgh South constituency at the 2017 United Kingdom general election. He finished second to Ian Murray, the Labour incumbent.

Ahead of the 2021 Scottish Parliament election, Eadie left the SNP and joined the Alba Party. He was nominated as the third-placed candidate on the Alba list in the Mid Scotland and Fife region. However, Alba failed to win any seats, having just polled 5,893 votes (1.7%) in that region alone.

At the 2024 general election, Eadie ran as Alba's candidate for the newly-created Rutherglen constituency, finishing seventh with 497 votes (1.2%).
