= Margaret Stirling Dobson =

Scottish printmaker

- Born: 29 July 1882; Galashiels
- Died: 13 August 1965; Isle of Wight
- Education: Edinburgh College of Art

Margaret Stirling Dobson ARE (1882-1965) was a Scottish painter, printmaker and author.

== Early life and education ==
Dobson was born in Galashiels and attended Queen Street School, Edinburgh (also known as the Mary Erskine School).

Dobson began her art training in 1901 at the Royal Institution (now the Royal Scottish Academy building) before enrolling at the Edinburgh College of Art between 1908 and 1910 where she was awarded a Diploma. After she completed her studies, Dobson relocated to London.

== Work and career ==
Dobson worked in a variety of media, producing oils, watercolours, and etchings. Her etchings and aquatints were reproduced in art magazines such as Apollo: A Journal of the Arts, Fine Prints of the Year, and Fine Prints.

She began exhibiting her work in 1905, firstly with the Royal Scottish Academy, and later with The Society of Women Artists, the Royal Society of Painter-Etchers, and the Royal Academy. She was elected an Associate Member of the Royal Society of Painter-Etchers in 1917.

In the early 1930s, Dobson published a series of art instruction books on printmaking, published by Sir Isaac Pitman & Sons, one of the world's leading educational publishers.

== Collections ==
Her work is represented in the permanent collections of the National Galleries of Scotland the National Gallery, Adelaide, and the Art Gallery of South Australia.

== Publications ==
Dobson published three books on printmaking, as part of Pitman's 'Craft for All' series.

- Block-Cutting and Printmaking By Hand (Sir Isaac Pitman & Sons: London, 1930)
- Lino Prints (Sir Isaac Pitman & Sons: London, 1930)
- Art Appreciation (Sir Isaac Pitman & Sons: London, 1932)
