= Fanny Herbertson =

English geographer (1864 – 1915)

Frances (Fanny) Louisa Dorothea Herbertson (née Richardson, 1864 – 1915) was a British geographer. Trained as a classicist, she contributed to geography teaching at the University of Oxford at the start of the twentieth century and published on human geography, especially teaching materials for schools.

== Life ==
Fanny was born in Leamington in 1864. Her godmother was geographer Dorothea Beale. She was educated at the King’s High School for Girls in Warwick.

She graduated with a BA in Classics from the University of London in 1888 and taught classics at Cheltenham Ladies’ College from that year until 1893, when she married geographer A.J. Herbertson, whom she had met at a summer school.

Fanny assisted her husband with his work teaching at the School of Geography in the University of Oxford, especially in writing textbooks and running summer schools for teachers. She co-wrote Man and His Work (1899) with him, and contributed books to the Oxford Geographies series. Some of her most successful solo-written books were the seven-volume school textbook Elementary Geography (1902–12). She also wrote a series of descriptive geographies and a biography of sociologist Frédéric le Play.

Fanny and A.J. had two children, Hunter and Margaret. Hunter went missing in action in World War I; Margaret became a general practitioner.

Fanny died of heart failure on 15 August 1915.
