= Joanna Drew =

English art gallery director

Joanna Drew CBE (1929–2003) was an English art gallery director and arts administrator. She worked for the Arts Council for nearly four decades, and was director of the Hayward Gallery from 1987 until 1992. She was once described as "unquestionably the most important individual in the British art scene".

== Life ==
Joanna Drew was born in India, the daughter of Brigadier Francis Greville Drew, later military governor of Eritrea, and the artist Sannie Drew. She was educated at Edinburgh Ladies' College and Dartington Hall before studying a course in the history and practice of art taught jointly by the University of Edinburgh and Edinburgh College of Art.

Drew joined the Arts Council in 1952 as an exhibition organizer. She helped organize Fernando Gamboa's 1953 exhibition of Mexican art at the Tate Gallery, and went on to organize the 1960 Picasso exhibition (where takings were too large to count at the end of the day), the 1964 Miró exhibition and the 1968 Henry Moore exhibition at the Tate. She became director of exhibitions at the Arts Council in 1975 and director of art in 1978. She was made director of the Hayward Gallery in 1987, and stayed in that role until she retired in 1992.

Outside of her work at the Arts Council, Drew was a trustee of the Elephant Trust and the Henry Moore Foundation.

Drew was diagnosed with pancreatic cancer in December 2002, and died in April the following year.
