= Judy Wagner =

British business leader, educator and executive search recruitment manager

Judy Wagner FRSE
- Education: Mary Erskine School and University of Edinburgh
- Occupations: business leader, educator executive search recruitment manager
- Employer: FWB Park Brown - co-founder now non-executive role
- Awards: Fellow of the Royal Society of Edinburgh 2021

Judy Wagner, FRSE is a British business leader, educator and executive search recruitment manager. She was made a Fellow of the Royal Society of Edinburgh in 2021 and is the co-founder and non-executive director of FWB Park Brown, an executive search company.

== Education and career ==
Wagner attended Mary Erskine School, Edinburgh and studied Accountancy at the University of Edinburgh. She became a chartered accountant and worked for EY before joining in 1993 with Scott Black and Willie Finlayson to found the company Finlayson Wagner Black, which was successful in head-hunting in the technology sector, building sales up to £1m in 2001/2 when there was an industry crash cutting 65% of their profits. Wagner diversified the organisation into construction and other traditional industries. She was described as a 'thrill seeker' in her personal hobbies and business life. Now she is a non-executive director, of what became FWB Park Brown, with branches in Aberdeen, Edinburgh and London, recruiting senior executives and non-executives, internationally, and she is also involved in two angel investment organisations. Her work life also involves education and charity board trusteeships.

== Role in business education ==
Wagner established with Susan Murphy, the Executive Women's Leadership Programme, the first of these in Scotland, and one of three in the UK, which won the 2017 award from the Edinburgh Chamber of Commerce for gender balance and with John Amis, the Non-Executive Directors Programme, within the University of Edinburgh Business School, where she sits on the International Advisory Board. Wagner also acts as a mentor for early stage entrepreneurs, with the Biocity organisation, now WAPG (We Are Pioneer Group).

== Other roles ==
Wagner is a trustee of Salveson Mindroom charity, which supports and empowers children and young people with learning difficulties, and previously of the Daisy Chain Trust, a local children's charity which gives grants to disadvantaged children. She was chair of the awards panel of the Institute of Chartered Accountants Scotland (ICAS) in 2018.

In 2022, Wagner was appointed to the Scottish Government-commissioned Women in Enterprise Review, which investigated the role of women in enterprise, focusing on accelerators and barriers. This review was chaired by Scottish entrepreneur and investor Ana Stewart and the report was co-authored by Stewart and Mark Logan.
