= John Murray (cricketer, born 1873) =

Scottish cricketer and Royal Navy officer

Personal information
- Full name: John Matthew Murray
- Born: 23 June 1873; Aberdeen, Aberdeenshire, Scotland
- Died: 31 May 1916 (aged 42); Aboard HMS Queen Mary, North Sea
- Batting: Right-handed
- Bowling: Right-arm fast

Career statistics
Competition	First-class
Matches	1
Runs scored	29
Batting average	14.50
100s/50s	–/–
Top score	29
Catches/stumpings	–/–
- Source: Cricinfo, 17 September 2019

John Matthew Murray (23 June 1873 – 31 May 1916) was a Scottish first-class cricketer and Royal Navy officer.

The son of James and Christina Murray, he was born at Aberdeen in June 1873. He was educated at both Aberdeen Grammar School and Galashiels Academy, before studying engineering at Heriot Watt Engineering School. He served in the Royal Navy, firstly as an assistant engineer, before being promoted to the rank of engineer in June 1902. He served as an engineering instructor at the Britannia Royal Naval College for over twenty years. He was appointed as the superintendent overseeing the construction of HMS King Edward VII in 1902, joining the ship when it was commissioned in 1905. A keen cricketer, Murray made a single first-class cricket appearance for the Royal Navy, making his debut against the British Army cricket team at Lord's in 1913. Batting twice in the match, he was dismissed without scoring in the Royal Navy's first-innings by Harold Fawcus, while in their second-innings he was dismissed for 29 runs by the same bowler. Murray served in the First World War, during which he was seconded to the battleship HMS Queen Mary. He served aboard the ship at the Battle of Jutland on 31 May 1916, when he was killed after the ship exploded and sank.
