= William Turnbull (cricketer) =

Scottish cricketer

Personal information
- Full name: William Fleming Turnbull
- Born: 26 January 1879; Falkirk, Stirlingshire, Scotland
- Died: 26 December 1959 (aged 80); Edinburgh, Midlothian, Scotland
- Batting: Right-handed
- Bowling: Unknown

Domestic team information
- Years: Team
- 1911–1912: Scotland

Career statistics
Competition	First-class
Matches	4
Runs scored	78
Batting average	13.00
100s/50s	–/–
Top score	41*
Balls bowled	6
Wickets	0
Bowling average	–
5 wickets in innings	–
10 wickets in match	–
Best bowling	–
Catches/stumpings	1/–
- Source: Cricinfo, 26 October 2022

William Fleming Turnbull (26 January 1879 – 26 December 1959) was a Scottish first-class cricketer.

Turnbull was born at Falkirk in January 1879. He was educated at Daniel Stewart's College. A club cricketer for Stewart's Former Pupils, Turnbull made his debut in first-class cricket for Scotland against Ireland at Glasgow in 1911. He made three further first-class appearances for Scotland, playing against the touring Indians in 1911 at Galashiels, and twice against the touring South Africans in 1912 at Glasgow and Edinburgh. In his four first-class appearances, Turnbull scored 78 runs at an average of 13.00, with a highest score of 41 not out. Outside of cricket, Turnbull was employed as a club master at Turnhouse Golf Club. In July 1935, he was fined 10 shillings for driving a motor vehicle without a license. Turnbull died at Edinburgh in December 1959.
