= Charles Scobie =

Scottish cricketer

Personal information
- Full name: Charles Smith Scobie
- Born: 21 February 1895; Edinburgh, Midlothian, Scotland
- Died: 2 September 1965 (aged 70); Edinburgh, Midlothian, Scotland
- Batting: Right-handed
- Bowling: Leg break googly

Domestic team information
- Years: Team
- 1923–1928: Scotland

Career statistics
Competition	First-class
Matches	8
Runs scored	95
Batting average	7.91
100s/50s	–/–
Top score	26
Balls bowled	1,050
Wickets	20
Bowling average	29.15
5 wickets in innings	1
10 wickets in match	–
Best bowling	5/112
Catches/stumpings	4/–
- Source: Cricinfo, 27 June 2023

Charles Smith Scobie (21 February 1895 — 2 September 1965) was a Scottish first-class cricketer and umpire.

The son of James Scobie, he was born at Edinburgh in February 1895. He was educated at Daniel Stewart’s College. Scobie began employment as a second class clerk with Sasine Office at the Registers of Scotland in May 1915, having been successful in an open competition for the role. He served in the British Army from July 1915, enlisting as a private with the Argyll and Sutherland Highlanders and by the time he was sent to the Western Front he was an acting corporal. He transferred to the Royal Flying Corps in September 1917, being commissioned as a temporary second lieutenant on probation in September 1917, and was confirmed in the rank in March 1918. He was seconded on attachment to 4 Squadron Australian Flying Corps in May 1918, before transferring to No. 80 Squadron RAF in July 1918, where he flew Sopwith Camels on low-level operations. At the end of the war he was transferred to the unemployed list, at which point he held the rank of lieutenant.

Following the war, Scobie returned to the Sasine Office. A club cricketer for Stewart's Former Pupils and Grange, he made his debut in first-class cricket for Scotland against Surrey at Glasgow in 1923. He played first-class cricket for Scotland until 1928, making eight appearances. Playing as a leg break googly bowler, he took 20 wickets at an average of 29.15; he took one five wicket haul, with figures of 5 for 112 against Lancashire in 1925. As a lower order batsman, he scored 95 runs in his eight matches with a highest score of 26. In addition to playing at first-class level, Scobie also stood as an umpire in the 1930 fixture between Scotland and Ireland at Aberdeen. He married Shena Bertram Melrose in July 1937 and later retired as assistant keeper at the Registers of Scotland. Scobie died at Edinburgh in September 1965.
