= Robert Nichol (cricketer) =

Scottish cricketer

Personal information
- Full name: Robert John Nichol
- Born: 14 March 1924; Galashiels, Selkirkshire, Scotland
- Died: 29 May 1996 (aged 72); Melrose, Roxburghshire, Scotland
- Batting: Right-handed
- Bowling: Right-arm fast-medium
- Relatives: David Nichol (brother); William Nichol (brother)

Domestic team information
- Years: Team
- 1951–1955: Scotland

Career statistics
Competition	First-class
Matches	7
Runs scored	67
Batting average	8.37
100s/50s	–/–
Top score	19
Balls bowled	1,128
Wickets	12
Bowling average	42.08
5 wickets in innings	1
10 wickets in match	–
Best bowling	5/87
Catches/stumpings	5/–
- Source: Cricinfo, 22 July 2022

Robert John Nichol (14 March 1924 — 29 May 1996) was a Scottish first-class cricketer.

Nichol was born at Galashiels in March 1924, where he was educated at Galashiels Academy. A club cricketer for Gala Cricket Club, he made his debut for Scotland in first-class cricket against Yorkshire at Scarborough on Scotland's 1951 tour of England. His next appearance for Scotland came two years later in 1953 against the same opposition in Glasgow, with Nichol playing first-class cricket for Scotland until 1955, making seven appearances. Playing in the Scottish side as a right-arm fast-medium bowler, he took 12 wickets at an average of 42.08; he took one five wicket haul, with figures of 5 for 87 against Yorkshire in 1953. As a tailend batsman, he scored 67 runs with a highest score of 19. A wool spinner by profession, Nichol died at Melrose in May 1996. His brother's, David and William, were also first-class cricketers.
