= Daniel Johnson (Scottish politician) =

Scottish Labour politician (born 1977)

Daniel Johnson MSP
- Official portrait, 2026

Member of the Scottish Parliament for Edinburgh Southern
- Incumbent
- Assumed office 5 May 2016
- Preceded by: Jim Eadie
- Majority: 4,963 (12.5%)

Scottish Labour portfolios
- 2017–2019: Shadow Cabinet Secretary for Justice
- 2021–2023: Shadow Cabinet Secretary for Finance
- 2023-present: Shadow Cabinet Secretary for Economy, Business and Fair Work

Personal details
- Born: Daniel Guy Johnson; 3 September 1977 (age 49) Edinburgh, Scotland
- Party: Scottish Labour Co-operative
- Children: 2 daughters
- Education: University of St Andrews; University of Strathclyde

Daniel Guy Johnson (born 3 September 1977) is a Scottish Labour and Co-operative politician who has served as the Member of the Scottish Parliament (MSP) for the Edinburgh Southern constituency since 2016.

== Early life ==
Johnson was born on 3 September 1977. He attended Bonaly Primary School and was privately educated at Stewart's Melville College. He joined the Labour Party at the age of 17. He graduated from the University of St Andrews in philosophy and from the University of Strathclyde in management.

Johnson's first job after leaving university was working as a constituency caseworker for Edinburgh South's MP Nigel Griffiths. He later went on to work as a management consultant for Accenture. Before he was elected, he became managing director of his father's group of shops: Paper Tiger and Studio One. The group became the first independent retailer in Edinburgh to become an accredited Living Wage employer in 2015.

== Political career ==
In January 2014, Johnson was selected by party members as a candidate for Edinburgh Southern prior to the 2016 Scottish Parliament election. He was elected to the Scottish Parliament in May 2016, gaining the seat from the Scottish National Party. He became shadow education minister for Scottish Labour in May 2016.

In December 2017, Johnson was promoted to the Shadow Cabinet as Justice Spokesperson. He resigned on 28 May 2019, the day after it was confirmed Scottish Labour had finished fifth in Scotland in the European Parliament elections and lost both its Scottish MEPs. He criticised the Labour Party's "direction and leadership" and noted Labour had finished sixth in Edinburgh. He challenged the party's Brexit policies, stating in his resignation letter he thought Labour should endorse a second referendum and campaign for remaining in the European Union.

In September 2020, Daniel Johnson called for Richard Leonard to resign as Scottish Labour leader, saying "Continuing like this will be disastrous for our party and is why I no longer have confidence in Richard Leonard’s leadership." After Leonard's resignation, Johnson nominated Anas Sarwar in the 2021 Scottish Labour leadership election. In March 2021, he was put back on to the front bench as the Finance Spokesperson for the Scottish Labour Party.

At the 2021 Scottish Parliament election Johnson was supported as a Labour Co-operative candidate for the first time and was re-elected to his seat.

Since 10 April 2023, Johnson has served as Economy, Business and Fair Work spokesperson for the Scottish Labour Party. Since 3 September 2025, Johnson has served as Convenor of the Scottish Parliament's Economy and Fair Work Committee.

Johnson backed the UK Government’s decision to introduce means-testing for the Winter Fuel Payment, voting in the Scottish Parliament against calls to reverse the decision.

At the Scottish Parliament election on 7th May 2026, Johnson was re-elected to represent Edinburgh Southern's new constituency boundary with 42.9% of the vote - an increased vote share of 8.4%. In June 2026, he was appointed Scottish Labour's Shadow Cabinet Secretary for Economy, Energy, Tourism and Transport.

In July 2026, he endorsed Michael Marra in the 2026 Scottish Labour leadership election following the resignation of Anas Sarwar.

=== Protection of Workers (Retail and Age-Restricted Goods and Services) (Scotland) Bill ===
In 2018, Johnson lodged a private member's bill which aimed to protect workers selling age restricted products. The Bill aimed to address increasing violence and abuse that shopworkers face, by introducing a new offence to protect workers and deter potential offenders. As retail workers who enforce a statutory age restriction are upholding the law in the wider public interest, it was argued that this group of workers needed further legal protection to help them carry out their duty. The Bill proposed a new statutory offence for assaulting, threatening or abusing a retail worker, and proposed a statutory aggravation to that offence where the retail worker is enforcing a statutory age restriction.

On the 18 September 2020, the Scottish Government indicated that they would be supporting the progress of the bill throughout parliament, a significant win for Johnson. The Bill was passed in January 2021.

=== Calum's Law ===
Johnson lodged the proposed Restraint and Seclusion (Prevention in Schools) (Scotland) Bill in June 2023. The aim of the bill is to ensure restraint and seclusion of children and young people in schools is only used as a last resort, where there is an immediate risk of harm and using appropriate methods. "Calum's Law" is named after Calum Morrison, who has epilepsy, autism and learning difficulties and was restrained on the floor by four adults until he lost consciousness while in primary school. Calum's Law passed unanimously in the Scottish Parliament in March 2026 and achieved Royal Ascent on 26th May 2026.

== Personal life ==
Johnson resides in the constituency with his wife, Jackie, and two daughters.

In 2017, Johnson revealed to Scottish Parliament that he had been diagnosed with attention deficit hyperactivity disorder (ADHD) late in life at the age of 35.

Daniel's hobbies include modifying and playing guitars and DIY.
