= Arthur Plowright =

Scottish cricketer

Personal information
- Full name: Arthur Vincent Plowright
- Born: 6 October 1916; Edinburgh, Midlothian, Scotland
- Died: 29 November 1992 (aged 76); Guildford, Surrey, England
- Batting: Right-handed

Domestic team information
- Years: Team
- 1937: Scotland

Career statistics
Competition	First-class
Matches	1
Runs scored	36
Batting average	18.00
100s/50s	–/–
Top score	29
Catches/stumpings	1/–
- Source: Cricinfo, 2 November 2022

Arthur Vincent Plowright (6 October 1916 – 29 November 1992) was a Scottish first-class cricketer and Royal Air Force officer.

The son of James Plowright, a cricketer and groundsman, he was born at Edinburgh in October 1916 and was educated at Daniel Stewart's College. A club cricketer for Stewart's Former Pupils, he made a single appearance in first-class cricket for Scotland against Yorkshire at Harrogate on Scotland's 1937 tour of England. Batting twice in the match, he was dismissed for 7 runs by Norman Yardley, while following-on in their second innings he was dismissed for 29 runs by Len Hutton, which was the highest score of the Scottish second innings. Plowright served in the Royal Air Force during the Second World War, being commissioned as a pilot officer on probation in April 1941. He was confirmed in the rank in April 1942, and was concurrently given the war substantive rank of flight officer. Following the war, he was commended by George VI in the 1947 New Year Honours for 'valuable service in the air', after which promotion to squadron leader in June 1948. He was promoted to wing commander in July 1955, later retiring in November 1971. Plowright was stationed in Berkshire during the 1950s and played in club cricket for Reading. He died at Guildford in November 1992.
