= Edinburgh Southern =

Region or constituency of the Scottish Parliament

- Burgh constituency for the Scottish Parliament
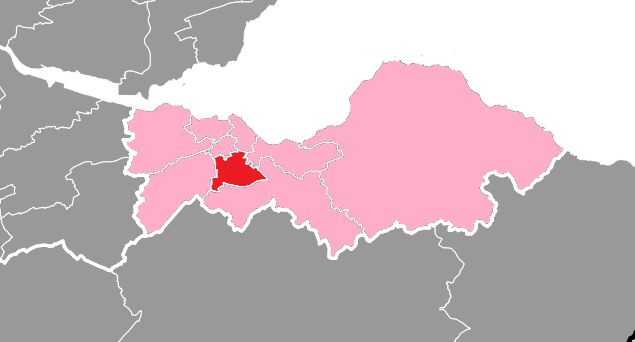

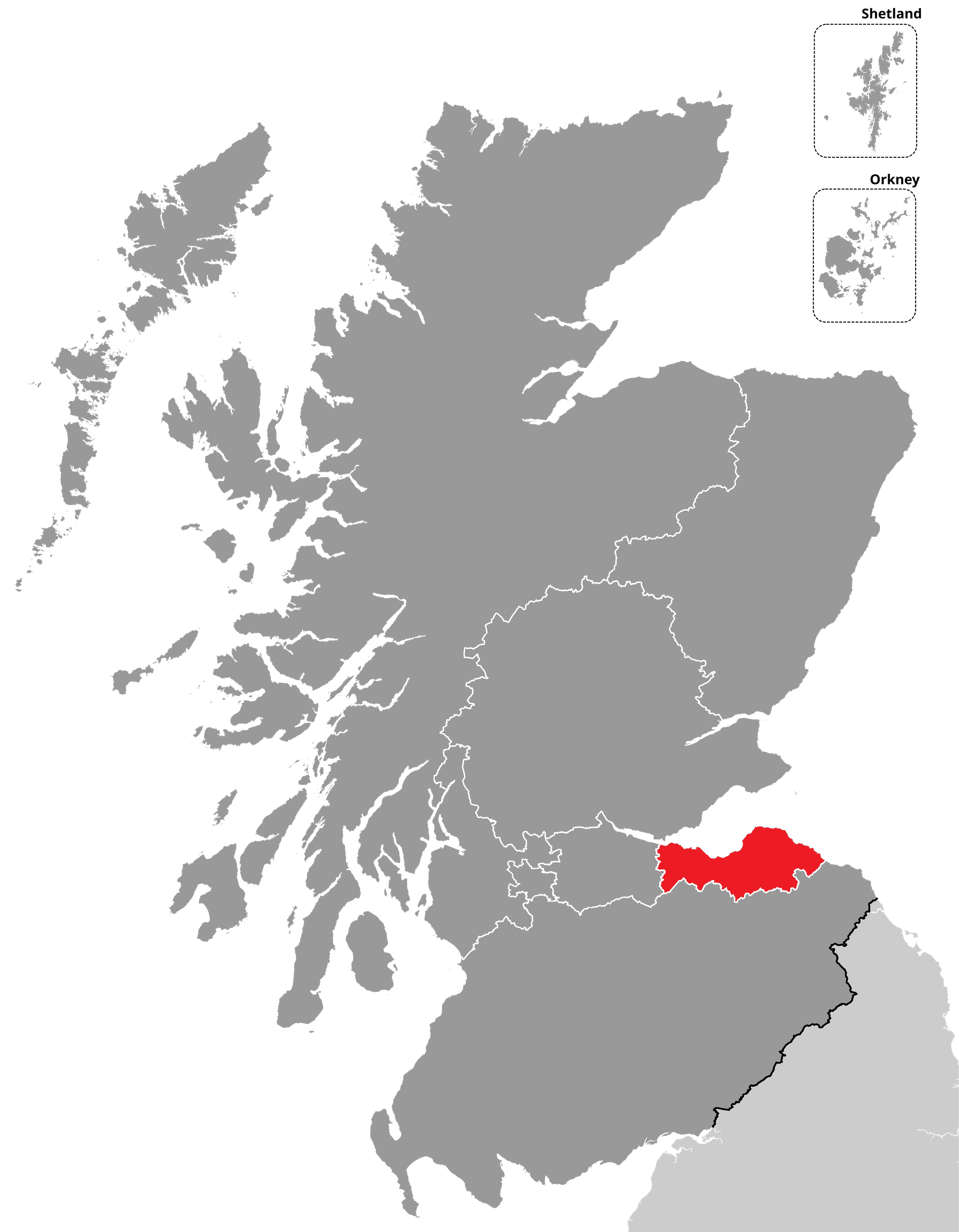
- Edinburgh Southern shown within the Edinburgh and Lothians East electoral region, and the region shown within Scotland
- Electoral region: Edinburgh and Lothians East
- Electorate: 64,868 (2026)

Current constituency
- Created: 2011
- Party: Scottish Labour
- MSP: Daniel Johnson
- Council area: City of Edinburgh
- Created from: Edinburgh South

Edinburgh Southern (Gaelic: Dùn Èideann a Deas) is a burgh constituency of the Scottish Parliament covering part of the council area of Edinburgh. It elects one Member of the Scottish Parliament (MSP) by the plurality (first past the post) method of election. Under the additional-member electoral system used for elections to the Scottish Parliament, it is also one of nine constituencies in the Edinburgh and Lothians East electoral region, which elects seven additional members, in addition to the nine constituency MSPs, to produce a form of proportional representation for the region as a whole. The Edinburgh Southern constituency was created as a result of the First Periodic Review of Scottish Parliament Boundaries and largely replaced the Edinburgh South constituency. Further boundary changes were enacted as a result of the second periodic review of Scottish Parliament boundaries in 2025.

The seat has been held by Daniel Johnson of Scottish Labour since the 2016 Scottish Parliament election.

== Electoral region ==
The other eight constituencies of the Edinburgh and Lothians East region are East Lothian Coast and Lammermuirs, Edinburgh Eastern, Musselburgh and Tranent, Edinburgh Central, Edinburgh North Western, Edinburgh North Eastern and Leith, Edinburgh Northern, Edinburgh South Western and Midlothian North. The region includes all of the City of Edinburgh and East Lothian council areas, and parts of the Midlothian council area.

Prior to the second periodic review of Scottish Parliament boundaries in 2025, Edinburgh Southern was part of the Lothian (Scottish Parliament electoral region) electoral region. The other eight constituencies of the Lothian region were Almond Valley, Edinburgh Central, Edinburgh Eastern, Edinburgh Northern and Leith, Edinburgh Pentlands, Edinburgh Western, Linlithgow and Midlothian North and Musselburgh. The region included all of the City of Edinburgh council area, parts of the East Lothian council area, parts of the Midlothian council area and all of the West Lothian council area.

== Constituency boundaries and council area ==
Map of 2011 boundaries

Edinburgh Southern was formed ahead of the 2011 Scottish Parliament election, and covered much of the area of the former constituency of Edinburgh South. It was one of six constituencies representing Edinburgh in the Scottish Parliament: Edinburgh Central, Edinburgh Eastern, Edinburgh Northern and Leith, Edinburgh Pentlands, Edinburgh Southern and Edinburgh Western.The electoral wards of the City of Edinburgh Council used to define the seat at this review were:

- Fountainbridge/Craiglockhart, Morningside, Southside/Newington (shared with Edinburgh Central)
- Liberton/Gilmerton, Portobello/Craigmillar (shared with Edinburgh Eastern)
- Sighthill/Gorgie shared with (Edinburgh Central, Edinburgh Pentlands)

Following the second periodic review of Scottish Parliament boundaries in 2025, Edinburgh is represented in the Scottish Parliament by seven constituencies: Edinburgh Eastern, Musselburgh and Tranent (which also includes part of East Lothian), Edinburgh Central, Edinburgh North Eastern and Leith, Edinburgh North Western, Edinburgh Northern, Edinburgh Southern, and Edinburgh South Western. Following the boundary changes enacted by this review, the Edinburgh Southern constituency now covers the following electoral wards:

- Colinton/Fairmilehead (shared with Edinburgh South Western)
- Morningside (shared with Edinburgh Central)
- Southside/Newington (shared with Edinburgh Central)
- Liberton/Gilmerton (entire ward)

== Constituency profile and voting patterns ==
On its 2011 boundaries, Edinburgh Southern was an extremely affluent suburban constituency wedged across the inner south of the City of Edinburgh. The constituency was largely composed of leafy Victorian townhousing based around the suburbs of Newington, Morningside, Craiglockhart, Blackford and Merchiston, with some social housing in parts of Prestonfield and Liberton. The 2026 boundaries shift the seat a little further south, losing areas in the north to Edinburgh Central, whilst gaining areas in the south from the former Edinburgh Pentlands seat.

Edinburgh Southern has a colourful mix of political traditions, with the equivalent Edinburgh South constituency at Westminster being represented by the Conservatives until being won by Labour's Nigel Griffiths in 1987. It has since returned Labour MPs, becoming Labour's only Scottish constituency at Westminster in 2015 following a landslide election for the Scottish National Party, who took 56 of 59 Westminster constituencies in Scotland. At the Scottish Parliament, Edinburgh South returned a Labour constituency MSP in 1999, voting Liberal Democrat in both 2003 and 2007 before being narrowly won by the SNP in 2011. In 2016, it became Labour's only constituency seat gain at the Scottish Parliament, despite the fact that the Conservative Party had the largest share of the vote on the regional list vote in the constituency.

== Member of the Scottish Parliament ==
Election	Member	Party
2011	Jim Eadie	SNP
2016	Daniel Johnson	Labour

== Election results ==
=== 2020s ===
2026 Scottish Parliament election: Edinburgh Southern (Note: Note that changes in vote share are shown with respect to the notional result of the 2021 election, calculated to account for boundary changes)
Party	Candidate	Constituency			Regional		
Party	Candidate	Votes	%	±%	Votes	%	±%
Labour	Daniel Johnson (Note: Incumbent member for this constituency)	16,963	42.9	▲8.4	10,210	25.7	▼1.7
Green					7,609	19.2	▲7.5
SNP	Deidre Brock	12,000	30.3	▼13.0	7,291	18.4	▼9.1
Conservative	Marie-Clair Munro	3,421	8.6	▼7.1	4,390	11.1	▼10.0
Liberal Democrats	Jane Alliston Pickard	3,334	8.4	▲2.4	4,038	10.2	▲2.9
Reform	Charles Turner	3,317	8.4	New	3,669	9.2	New
Independent	Jeremy Balfour (Note: Incumbent member on the party list, or for another constituency)				500	1.3	New
Independent Green Voice					338	0.9	New
Independent	Ash Regan				273	0.7	New
Scottish Family					245	0.6	▲0.2
Edinburgh & East Lothian People	Marc Wilkinson	524	1.3	New	197	0.5	New
Animal Welfare					178	0.4	0.0
AtLS					161	0.4	New
Scottish Socialist					153	0.4	New
Workers Party					93	0.2	New
ISP					92	0.2	New
Communist					70	0.2	0.0
Independent	Bob Bonnie Prince				68	0.2	New
Advance UK					40	0.1	New
Equality					39	0.1	New
Scottish Libertarian					28	0.1	0.0
Independent	Morgwn Davies				5	0.0	New
Majority		4,963	12.5	▲8.5			
Valid votes		39,559			39,687		
Invalid votes		212			92		
Turnout		39,771	61.31	▼8.9	39,779	61.32	▼8.9
Labour hold		Swing		▲10.7			
Notes

2021 notional result: Edinburgh Southern (Note: Estimate of the 2021 Scottish Parliament election result as if the revised boundaries recommended under the 2025 boundary review were in place)
Party	Candidate	Constituency			Regional		
Party	Candidate	Votes	%	±%	Votes	%	±%
Labour	Daniel Johnson (Note: Incumbent member for this constituency)	17,273	40.9	N/A	11,635	27.4	N/A
SNP	Catriona MacDonald	15,571	36.9	N/A	11,669	27.5	N/A
Conservative	Miles Briggs (Note: Incumbent member on the party list, or for another constituency)	6,770	16.0	N/A	8,950	21.1	N/A
Green					4,951	11.7	N/A
Liberal Democrats	Fred Mackintosh	2,386	5.6	N/A	3,096	7.3	N/A
Alba					659	1.6	N/A
Other	N/A	247	0.6	N/A	1,432	3.4	N/A
Majority		1,702	4.0	N/A			
Valid votes		42,247			42,392		
Labour win (new boundaries)							
Notes

2021 Scottish Parliament election: Edinburgh Southern
Party	Candidate	Constituency			Regional		
Party	Candidate	Votes	%	±%	Votes	%	±%
Labour	Daniel Johnson (Note: Incumbent member for this constituency)	20,760	45.9	▲10.3	11,128	24.5	▲2.6
SNP	Catriona MacDonald	16,738	37.0	▲4.4	11,053	24.3	▲1.1
Conservative	Miles Briggs (Note: Incumbent member on the party list, or for another constituency)	5,258	11.6	▼14.5	9,357	20.6	▼8.6
Green					8,605	18.9	▲2.1
Liberal Democrats	Fred Mackintosh	2,189	4.8	▼1.0	3,373	7.4	▲2.2
Alba					611	1.3	New
All for Unity					250	0.5	New
Women's Equality					194	0.4	▼1.4
Scottish Family	Philip Holden	317	0.7	New	192	0.4	New
Animal Welfare					170	0.4	New
Communist					88	0.2	New
Reform					83	0.2	New
Freedom Alliance (UK)					81	0.2	New
Abolish the Scottish Parliament					77	0.2	New
Scottish Libertarian					59	0.1	New
Independent	Ashley Graczyk				43	0.1	New
SDP					34	0.1	New
UKIP					21	0.0	▼1.0
Renew					8	0.0	New
Majority		4,022	8.9	▲6.0			
Valid votes		45,262			45,427		
Invalid votes		204			55		
Turnout		45,466	71.11	▲6.5	45,482	71.13	▲6.4
Labour hold		Swing		▲3.0			

=== 2010s ===
2016 Scottish Parliament election: Edinburgh Southern
Party	Candidate	Constituency			Region		
Party	Candidate	Votes	%	±%	Votes	%	±%
Labour	Daniel Johnson	13,597	35.5	▲8.1	8,425	21.9	▲3.0
SNP	Jim Eadie (Note: Incumbent member for this constituency)	12,474	32.6	▲3.2	8,934	23.2	▼6.2
Conservative	Miles Briggs (Note: Elected on the party list)	9,972	26.1	▲7.5	11,215	29.2	▲12.5
Green					6,476	16.8	▲2.0
Liberal Democrats	Pramond Subbaraman	2,216	5.8	▼18.8	1,982	5.2	▼3.8
Women's Equality					689	1.8	New
UKIP					376	1.0	▲0.5
RISE					264	0.7	New
Solidarity					98	0.3	▲0.2
Majority		1,123	2.9	N/A			
Valid votes		38,259			38,459		
Invalid votes		233			64		
Turnout		38,492	64.6	▲2.6	38,523	64.7	▲2.9
Labour gain from SNP		Swing					
Notes

2011 Scottish Parliament election: Edinburgh Southern
Party	Candidate	Constituency			Region		
Party	Candidate	Votes	%	±%	Votes	%	±%
SNP	Jim Eadie	9,947	29.4	N/A	9,952	29.4	N/A
Labour	Paul Godzik	9,254	27.4	N/A	6,411	18.9	N/A
Conservative	Gavin Brown (Note: Incumbent member on the party list, or for another constituency)	6,298	18.6	N/A	5,636	16.7	N/A
Green					4,993	14.8	N/A
Liberal Democrats	Mike Pringle	8,297	24.6	N/A	3,036	9.0	N/A
Independent	Margo MacDonald				2,472	7.3	N/A
All-Scotland Pensioners Party					242	0.7	N/A
Scottish Socialist					189	0.6	N/A
UKIP					185	0.5	N/A
Independent	David Hogg				183	0.5	N/A
Socialist Labour					116	0.3	N/A
Liberal					109	0.3	N/A
BNP					100	0.3	N/A
Scottish Christian					86	0.3	N/A
CPA					62	0.2	N/A
Solidarity					29	0.1	N/A
Independent	Ken O'Neil				20	0.0	N/A
Independent	Mev Brown				13	0.0	N/A
Majority		693	2.0	N/A			
Valid votes		33,796			33,834		
Invalid votes		210			101		
Turnout		34,006	62.0	N/A	33,935	61.8	N/A
SNP win (new seat)							

== See also ==
- Edinburgh South (UK Parliament constituency)
