= North Berwick High School =

Secondary school in Scotland

Coordinates: 56°3′10″N 2°43′16″W

- The school logo

Location
- Grange Road; North Berwick, East Lothian, EH39 4QS; Scotland

Information
- Type: State funded Secondary school
- Motto: Aim Higher
- Established: 1893
- Local authority: East Lothian Council
- Head Teacher: Michelle Moore (since 2020)
- Gender: Mixed
- Enrolment: approx. 1000
- Houses: Craig, Fidra, Glen and Law
- Colours: Red & Black
- Website: https://sites.google.com/edubuzz.org/nbhs-main-website/home

North Berwick High School is a non-denominational state secondary school in North Berwick, East Lothian, Scotland. In 2025, the school was rated as number 14 on Scotland's list of best and worst secondary schools in the country.

== See also ==
- People educated at North Berwick High School
