= Bill Holdsworth =

English cricketer

William Edgar Newman Holdsworth (17 September 1928 – 31 July 2016) was an English first-class cricketer, who played twenty seven matches for Yorkshire County Cricket Club in 1952 and 1953. He also appeared for the Yorkshire Second XI.

Born in Armley, Leeds, Yorkshire, England, he was a right arm fast medium bowler, he took 53 wickets at 30.15, with a best of 6 for 58 against Derbyshire. He also took 5 for 21 against Essex. A right-handed tail end batsman, he scored 111 runs at 7.92, with a highest score of 22* against Glamorgan. He also took 7 catches.

He died on 31 July 2016 at the age of 87.
