= Merchiston Castle School =

Location
- 294 Colinton Road; Edinburgh, EH13 0PU; Scotland; 55.911729°N 3.253568°W

Information
- Type: Public school Private boarding and day school
- Motto: Ready Ay Ready
- Established: 1828; 198 years ago
- Founder: Charles Chalmers
- Local authority: Education Scotland; Edinburgh City
- Chairman of Governors: Gareth Baird
- Headmaster: Huw Jones
- Staff: 90 full and part time
- Gender: Boys
- Age: 7 to 18
- Enrolment: 400 (approx)
- Student to teacher ratio: 1:7
- Houses: Pringle; Chalmers West; Chalmers East; Rogerson; Evans; Laidlaw
- Colours: Navy, red & white
- Publication: The Merchiston Messenger; The Merchistonian
- School fees: £15,030-£35,190 per year
- Alumni: Merchistonians
- Education Scotland Reports: Report
- OSCR: SC016580
- Website: www.merchiston.co.uk

Merchiston Castle School is a private boarding school for boys in the suburb of Colinton in Edinburgh, Scotland. It has around 470 pupils and is open to boys between the ages of 7 and 18 as either boarding or day pupils, with a co-ed nursery named The Forest. It was modelled after English public schools. It is divided into Merchiston Juniors (ages 7–13), Middle Years (ages 13–16) and a Sixth Form.

== History ==
In 1828 Charles Chalmers started a small school in Park Place on a site now occupied by the McEwan Hall. In May 1833, Charles Chalmers took a lease of Merchiston Castle (the former home of John Napier, the inventor of logarithms) — which at that time stood in rural surroundings — and moved the school. It is from here that the school name is derived. Over time, the number of pupils grew and the Merchiston Castle became too small to accommodate the school. The governors decided to purchase 90 acres of ground at the Colinton House estate, four miles south-west of Edinburgh. Building began in 1928 including the Chalmers and Rogerson boarding houses, designed by Sir Robert Lorimer. In 1930 the school moved to Colinton.

Three years later, in 1933, Merchiston celebrated its centenary, attended by the Duke and Duchess of York. Fifty years on, in 1983, at a time of further expansion and with 350 boys on the roll, their daughter, now Queen Elizabeth II, visited the school for its 150th anniversary.

== Academic performance ==
In 2018, 50% of grades achieved at A Level were A*/A. In 2025, 38% of grades achieved at A level were A*/A.

In 2025, 55% of grades achieved at GCSEs were A*/A, the second highest across Private schools in Scotland.

== Sports and games ==
A range of sports and activities is available at the school; particularly in rugby union, which over 60 Merchistonians have played at international level. The Merchistonian Football Club for former pupils of the School was a founding member of the Scottish Rugby Union and was involved in the very first rugby international, supplying three players. The former 1st XV coach, Frank Hadden, who was at the school from 1983 to 2000, was the head coach of the Scottish national team from 2005 to 2009. The school has won the Scottish Schools U18 Rugby Cup a record eight times: 1998, 2000, 2001, 2002, 2008, 2018, 2021 and 2022. Merchiston also participates, with the Edinburgh Academy, in the oldest continuous rugby football fixture in the world, the first being on 11 December 1858 at Raeburn Place, Edinburgh.

The school launched a golfing academy in 2011. As of 1 September 2026, the academy ranks 19th according to the Independent Schools Golfing Association.

== Merchiston tartan ==
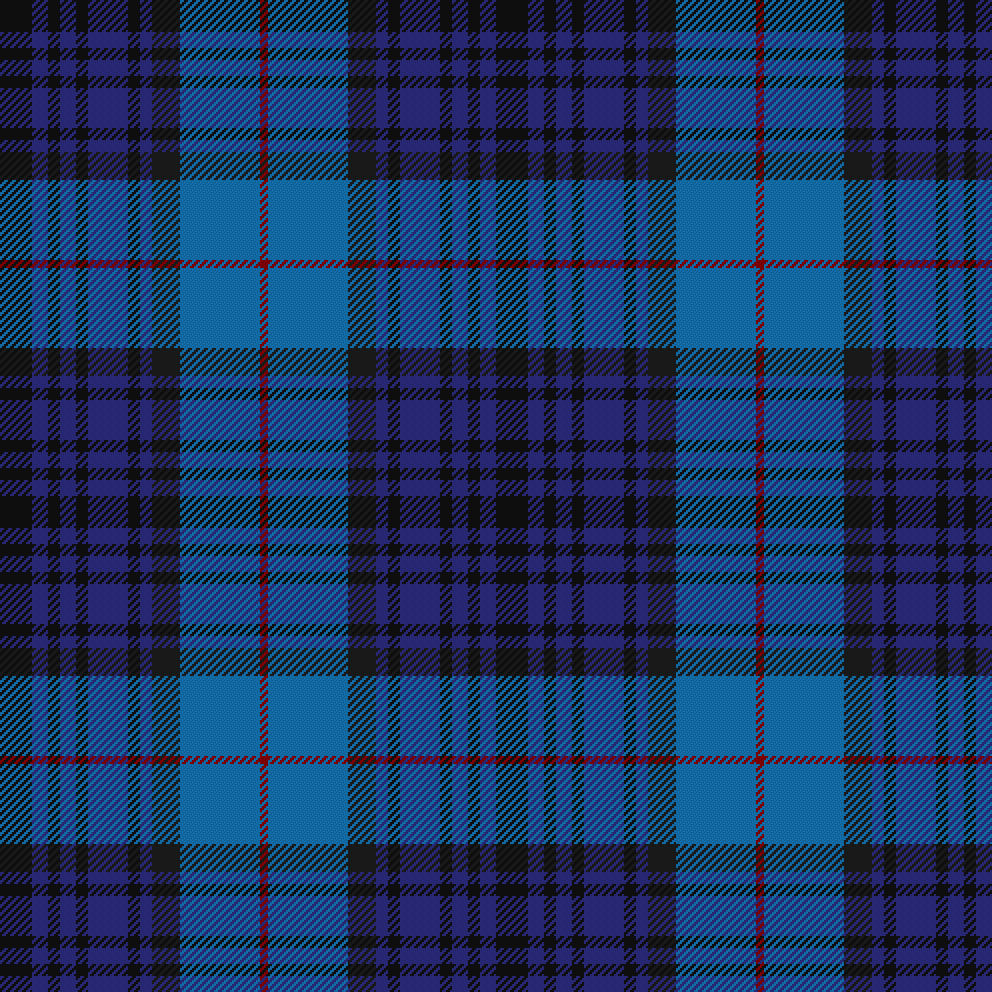
Merchiston Castle School tartan

The Merchiston Castle School tartan was designed by Kinloch Anderson in 1988. It is based upon the Napier tartan as the school was founded in the 1830s in the original home of John Napier of Merchiston, now part of Edinburgh Napier University. The tartan retains the sett of the Napier tartan, but changes the white to royal blue, the royal blue to navy, and the white line to scarlet to reflect the school colours.

== Historical abuse ==
Gordon Cruden, a French teacher, stood trial at Edinburgh Sheriff Court and was found guilty in December 2015 of three charges of indecent exposure at the school between 1980 and 1985. The court did not proceed to a conviction, but dealt with the matter in terms of section 246 (3) of the Criminal Procedure (Scotland) Act 1995 by way of an absolute discharge. This means that although Cruden was found guilty, he was not convicted of the offences for which he stood trial.

In 2021 at the Scottish Child Abuse Inquiry, the lawyer representing Merchiston said there was at least one member of the staff where the warning signs were missed. He gave an "unreserved apology" to former pupils who were abused at school.

Former pupils described abuse at Merchiston as comparable to "the Lord of the Flies" in further hearings at the Scottish Child Abuse Inquiry. One of the pupils stated that you had to "accept there was a form of corruption" alongside the school behaving "in whatever manner pleased it" and that "staff did 'nothing whatsoever' to help pupils". The inquiry resumed its proceedings in January 2022, already discovering a culture of 'don't yell and don't tell' at the school with a former pupil stating that "No one would have listened" to issues raised by pupils and that "the school would not have taken action after complaints" during their tenure.

== Merchiston International School in Shenzhen ==
Merchiston Castle School developed Merchiston International School after a year of collaboration with Chinese investor Lv Jianjun. Merchiston International School in Shenzhen is under Lv Jianjun's management. Merchiston International School opened in August 2018 as the first school in Longhua District, Shenzhen, Guangdong province, China. The school can cater to 1,200 students aged between 5 and 18. Lessons are taught in English and pupils from grades 1 to 9 follow the English national curriculum, with additional access to Mandarin language learning. Senior students study for the IGCSE and A-levels. With accommodation for 600, the senior school is exclusively for boarding students. 80 per cent of the teaching staff are from the United Kingdom.
