= Galashiels Academy =

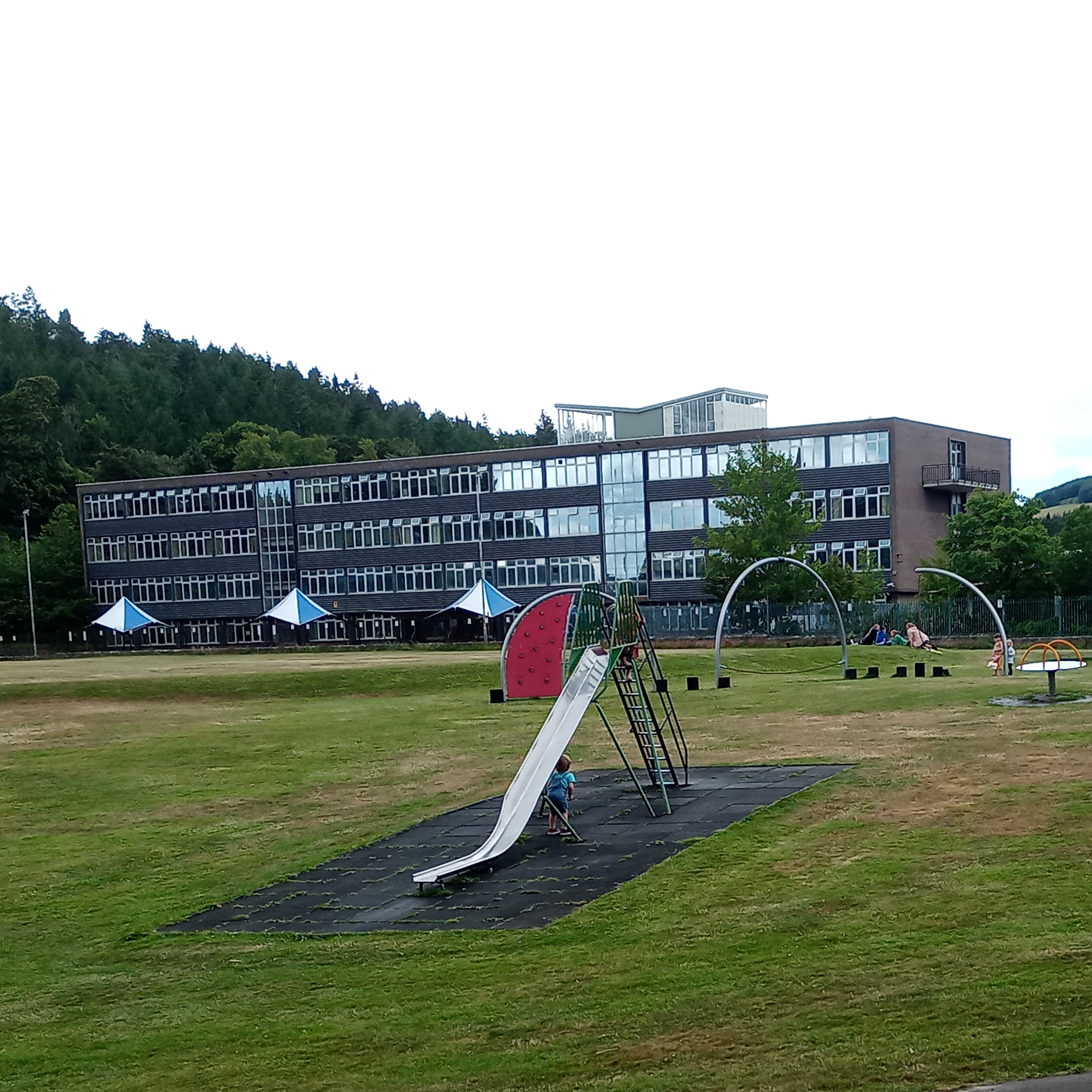

Location
- Elm Row; Galashiels, TD1 3HU; Scotland; 55°36′45″N 2°48′45″W

Information
- Type: Secondary comprehensive
- Motto: Fide Et Industria (Faith And Dillegence)
- Established: 1696; 1938 (refounded)
- Local authority: Scottish Borders
- Head teacher: Steven Raeburn
- Gender: Coeducational
- Age: 11 to 18
- Houses: Eildon; Tweed; Abbotsford; Yair
- Colours: Red; Green; Blue; Yellow
- Website: http://www.galashiels.org.uk/

Galashiels Academy is the high school in Galashiels, Scotland, that serves the surrounding area including Stow. Refounded in 1938, the school's history goes back as far as 1696. The old building was built in 1964. The new building, The Galashiels Community campus, was completed in 2025 and opened to pupils and public in January 2026, while the old building has finished the demolish process on Thrusday 13 August 2026.

== Notable former pupils ==
- John Collins, professional football player and manager
- John Davidson, campaigner for those affected by Tourette syndrome
- Stuart Kelly, author and literary critic
- Alan V. Murray, historian
- John Murray, cricketer, engineer and Royal Navy officer
- David Nichol, cricketer, brother of the below
- Robert Nichol, cricketer, brother of the above
- Chris Paterson (b. 1978), rugby union player
- David Purves, environmental scientist, playwright and poet
- The Rev Canon W. Gordon Reid, Rector of St. Clement's Church, Philadelphia
- Gregor Townsend, rugby player
- Paul Johnston, British diplomat
