= George Youngson =

Scottish cricketer

Personal information
- Born: 12 December 1919; Aberdeen, Scotland
- Died: 8 December 1982 (aged 62)
- Batting: Right-handed
- Bowling: Right-arm fast-medium

Career statistics
Competition	First-class
Matches	19
Runs scored	64
Batting average	3.76
100s/50s	0/0
Top score	18
Balls bowled	5,027
Wickets	75
Bowling average	24.81
5 wickets in innings	3
10 wickets in match	1
Best bowling	7/42
Catches/stumpings	7/–
- Source: ESPNCricinfo, 16 April 2023

George William Youngson (12 December 1919 – 8 December 1982) was a Scottish first-class cricketer. A right arm paceman from Aberdeen, only Douglas Barr and Jimmy Allan have taken more wickets for Scotland.
