= William Nichol (cricketer) =

Scottish cricketer

Cricket information
- Batting: Left-handed
- Bowling: Slow left-arm orthodox

Career statistics
Competition	First-class
Matches	26
Runs scored	931
Batting average	23.27
100s/50s	2/5
Top score	139*
Balls bowled	4,098
Wickets	55
Bowling average	25.36
5 wickets in innings	3
10 wickets in match	1
Best bowling	7/39
Catches/stumpings	13/–
- Source: ESPNCricinfo

William Nichol (3 December 1912 – 1 June 1973) was a Scottish cricketer.

Nichol was an all-rounder made two centuries for Scotland, the first an unbeaten 139 against Warwickshire in May 1951 and the other an even hundred against Ireland a couple of months later. His best bowling performance came against the Irish three years prior, taking 7 for 39 and 5 for 39 at Glasgow
