= Nicholls (surname) =

Nicholls is a surname of English origin. It is one of the patronymics derived from the given name Nicholas. The first record of the spelling is in 1322, in Staffordshire, England.

== Notable people with name ==
=== A-E ===
- Adelina Nicholls, American sociologist
- Agnes Nicholls (1876–1959), English soprano
- Alan Nicholls (1973–1995), English football goalkeeper
- Alana Nicholls (born 1986), Australian kayaker
- Alex Nicholls (disambiguation), multiple people
- Allan F. Nicholls (born 1945), Canadian actor and film director
- Andy Nicholls (born 1962), English soccer hooligan and writer
- Anna Nicholls (born 1997), English cricketer
- Anthony Nicholls (disambiguation), multiple people
- Apii Nicholls-Pualau (born 1993), New Zealand rugby player
- Arthur Nicholls (disambiguation), multiple people
- Ashley Nicholls (born 1981), English footballer
- Benjamin Nicholls (1864–1945), English cricketer
- Bernard Nicholls (1877–1924), American golfer
- Bernie Nicholls (born 1961), Canadian ice hockey player
- Billy Nicholls (born 1949), English musician
- Brenda Nicholls (born 1972), Canadian curler
- Brooke Nicholls, Canadian singer and songwriter
- Burr H. Nicholls (1848–1915), American painter
- Caroline Nicholls (born 1956), South African judge
- Charles Wynne Nicholls (1831–1903), Irish painter
- Charlie Nicholls (1899–1944), Australian rules footballer
- Christine Nicholls (born 1943), British author
- Cornelius Nicholls (1838–1895), English cricketer
- Craig Nicholls (born 1977), Australian musician
- Daniel Nicholls (born 1987), Australian rules footballer
- Danielle Nicholls (born 1978), English television presenter
- Danni Nicholls (born 1985), British singer-songwriter
- Darren Nicholls (born 1989), Australian rugby league footballer
- David Nicholls (disambiguation), multiple people
- Degory Nicholls, 16th-century priest and academic
- Derek Nicholls (1947–2010), English cricketer
- Don Nicholls (1936–2023), Australian rules footballer
- Douglas Nicholls (1906–1988), Australian Governor of South Australia
- Donald Nicholls, Baron Nicholls of Birkenhead (1933–2019), British Law Lord
- Eddie Nicholls (born 1947), Guyanese cricketer
- Edith E. Nicholls (1892–1978), American physician
- Elizabeth Nicholls (1946–2004), American-Canadian paleontologist
- Elizabeth Webb Nicholls (1850–1943), Australian suffragist
- Eric Nicholls (born 1939), Australian rules footballer
- Ernest Nicholls (1884–1954), Australian rules footballer
- Ernie Nicholls (1871–1971), English footballer

=== F-L ===
- Francis T. Nicholls (1834–1912), American Confederate Army general, lawyer, judge and politician
- Frank Nicholls (1699–1778), English physician
- Frankie Knuckles, birth name Francis Warren Nicholls Jr. (1955–2014), American DJ and record producer
- Frederic Thomas Nicholls (1856–1921), Canadian businessman and politician
- Frederick Nicholls (1868–1950), British rugby player
- Freida Nicholls-Davy (born 1950), Barbadian sprinter
- Geoff Nicholls (1948–2017), English musician
- George Nicholls (disambiguation), multiple people
- Gilbert Nicholls (1878–1950), English-American golfer
- Ginger Nicholls (1900–1978), New Zealand rugby union player
- Gladys Nicholls (1906–1981), Australian Aboriginal activist
- Graeme Nicholls, English guitarist
- Graham Nicholls (born 1975), English artist
- Gregory Nicholls, Barbadian politician
- Gwyn Nicholls (1874–1939), British rugby player
- Harmar Nicholls, Baron Harmar-Nicholls (1912–2000), British politician
- Harold Nicholls (1897–1977), New Zealand rugby player
- Harold Mayne-Nicholls (born 1961), Chilean journalist
- Harry Nicholls (comedian) (1852–1926), English comedian
- Harry Nicholls (VC) (1915–1975), English recipient of the Victoria Cross
- Henry Nicholls (disambiguation), multiple people
- Herbert Nicholls (1868–1940), Australian judge and politician
- Hope Nicholls (born 1960), American singer-songwriter
- Horace Nicholls (1867–1941), English photographer
- Howard Nicholls (1931–2011), Welsh rugby union player
- Humphrey Nicholls (1577–1643), English politician
- Ian A. Nicholls (born 1962), Australian educator and academic
- Jack Nicholls (footballer) (1898–1970), Welsh footballer
- James Nicholls (disambiguation), multiple people
- Jamie Nicholls (disambiguation), multiple people
- Jill Nicholls, British documentary filmmaker
- Jim Nicholls (1919–2002), English football goalkeeper
- Joe Nicholls (disambiguation), multiple people
- John Nicholls (disambiguation), multiple people
- Jonathan Nicholls (1956–2022), British university officer
- Josh Nicholls (born 1992), Chinese-Canadian ice hockey player
- Kenneth Nicholls (died 2025), Irish academic and historian
- Kevin Nicholls (born 1979), English footballer

=== L-R ===
- Laura Nicholls (disambiguation), multiple people
- Lee Nicholls (born 1992), English footballer
- Lew Nicholls, American politician
- Linda Nicholls (born 1954), Canadian Anglican bishop
- Marjory Nicholls (1890–1930), New Zealand poet, teacher and drama producer
- Mark Nicholls (disambiguation), multiple people
- Marriott Fawckner Nicholls (1898–1969), English surgeon
- Martin Nicholls (1917–1983), Australian politician and trade unionist
- Matthew Nicholls (disambiguation), multiple people
- Matt Nicholls (born 1986), British musician
- Mel Nicholls (born 1977), English wheelchair athlete
- Melanie Nicholls-King, Canadian actress
- Mike Nicholls, Australian psychology researcher
- Mikey Nicholls (born 1985), Australian wrestler known as Nick Miller
- Morgan Nicholls (born 1971), English musician
- Nick Nicholls (1936–2013), English motorcycle speedway rider
- Nigel Nicholls (1938–2016), British civil servant
- Obed Nicholls (1885–1962), English craftsman
- Olivia Nicholls (born 1994), British tennis player
- Patrick Nicholls (born 1948), English politician
- Paul Nicholls (disambiguation), multiple people
- Peter Nicholls (disambiguation), multiple people
- Phil Nicholls (born 1952), English footballer
- Phoebe Nicholls (born 1957), English actress
- Rachel Nicholls, English soprano
- Reg Nicholls (disambiguation), multiple people
- Rhoda Holmes Nicholls (1854–1930), English-American painter
- Richard Nicholls (1875–1948), English cricketer
- Rick Nicholls (born 1950), Canadian politician
- Robert Nicholls (disambiguation), multiple people
- Robyn Nicholls (born 1990), British water polo player
- Roger Nicholls (born 1956), Australian politician
- Ron Nicholls (disambiguation), multiple people
- Ryan Nicholls (born 1973), Welsh footballer

=== S-Z ===
- Sally Nicholls (born 1983), British writer
- Sammy Nicholls (1870–1912), English footballer
- Samuel Nicholls (1885–1939), Australian politician
- Samuel J. Nicholls (1885–1937), American politician
- Sara Nicholls (born 1989), Welsh lawn bowler
- Sheila Nicholls, (born 1970), English singer-songwriter
- Simon Nicholls (1882–1911), American baseball player
- Stan Nicholls (born 1949), British writer
- Stephen Nicholls (born 1971), Australian cardiologist
- Stewart Nicholls, British stage director and choreographer
- Sue Nicholls (born 1943), English actress
- Syd Nicholls (1896–1977), Australian cartoonist and commercial artist
- Sydney Nicholls (1868–1946), British rugby player
- Theo Nicholls (1894–1977), Australian politician
- Thomas Nicholls (disambiguation), multiple people
- Tim Nicholls (born 1965), Australian politician
- Tom Nicholls (born 1992), Australian rules footballer
- Victoria Nicholls, Australian actress
- Vernon Nicholls (1917–1996), English Anglican clergyman
- Yvonne Nicholls (1914–2009), Australian activist and author
- Will Nicholls (born 1995), British photographer and film-maker
- William Nicholls (disambiguation), multiple people

== Fictional characters ==
- Deputy Roy Nicholls, a character in the 2019 film Scary Stories to Tell in the Dark
- Stella Nicholls, a character in the 2019 film Scary Stories to Tell in the Dark
