= William A. Conant =

American politician and merchant (1816–1909)

William Augustus Conant (November 9, 1816 – November 28, 1909) was an American merchant, politician, and railroad agent.

== Life ==
Conant was born on November 9, 1816 in Craftsbury, Vermont, the son of Newell Conant, a miller and farmer, and Sarah Pierce.

Conant attended common schools and academies in Vermont. He later moved to Huntington, New York, where he was a merchant and notary public. In 1868, he was elected to the New York State Assembly as a Republican, representing Suffolk County. He served in the Assembly in 1869. He ran a general store with Carlos D. Stuart under the firm name Conant and Stuart. He later was associated with his brother-in-law George M. Tileston.

Conant sold his Huntington store and residence in 1872 and moved to Black Hawk, Colorado. In 1874, he moved to Colorado Springs and worked as an agent for the Atchison, Topeka and Santa Fe Railway. In 1877, while searching for fossils near Beulah, he allegedly uncovered the petrified remains of a giant later called the Solid Muldoon. He then went with the Muldoon on a tour all the way to New York. John Harrison Mills, Frederick Samuel Dellenbaugh, and Francis Darwin (also speaking on his father Charles Darwin's behalf) all quickly declared it a fraud. It was later revealed that George Hull (who orchestrated the Cardiff Giant hoax in 1869) was responsible for the Muldoon as well. P. T. Barnum provided financial support for the ruse, allegedly employed Conant to participate, and claimed the Muldoon was legitimate to further promote and publicize it.

In 1880, Conant became agent of the Atchison, Tokepa and Sansa Fe Railway in Santa Fe, New Mexico. In 1883, he became agent of the Atlantic and Pacific Railroad in Winslow, Arizona and was in charge of the station at what would become the Red Rock Bridge. In 1884, he ran for the Arizona Territorial Legislature with the Independent Party of Apache County. By 1885, he was working for the Atlantic and Pacific Railroad in Colorado Springs.

In 1837, Conant married Maria Louisa Weed. Their children were William L., Frederick Herbert, and Florence C.

Conant died at home from pneumonia on November 28, 1909. His funeral was held at his home, with Rev. L. J. Spencer of the Universalist Church officiating the service and Rev. D. G. Monfort of the Emanuel Presbyterian Church giving a prayer. He was buried in Evergreen Cemetery.

New York State Assembly
Preceded by James M. Halsey	New York State Assembly; Suffolk County; 1869	Succeeded by Brinley D. Sleight
