= Emmanuel Presbyterian Church =

Emmanuel Presbyterian Church may refer to:

- Emmanuel Presbyterian Church (Colorado Springs, Colorado), listed on the NRHP in Colorado
- Emmanuel Presbyterian Church (Rochester, New York), listed on the NRHP in New York
- Emmanuel Presbyterian Church (Whippany, New Jersey)
- Emmanuel Orthodox Presbyterian Church, (Wilmington, Delaware)
