= James Nichols =

James Nichols may refer to:

- James D. Nichols (1928–2003), American jockey
- James Nichols, convicted for the 2007 murder of Cha Vang in Wisconsin
- James P. Nichols, recording industry producer and engineer
- James Nichols (printer) (1785–1861), English printer and theological writer
- James Edward Nichols (1902–1972), Welsh geneticist
- James Douglas Nichols (1954–2017), American farmer, brother of Terry Nichols, convicted Oklahoma City Bombing accomplice
- James W. Nichols (born 1946), American farmer and politician

== See also ==
- James Nicholls (disambiguation)
- Jim Nickalls (1934–2016), English football centre-half for Darlington
