= John Harrison Mills =

American poet

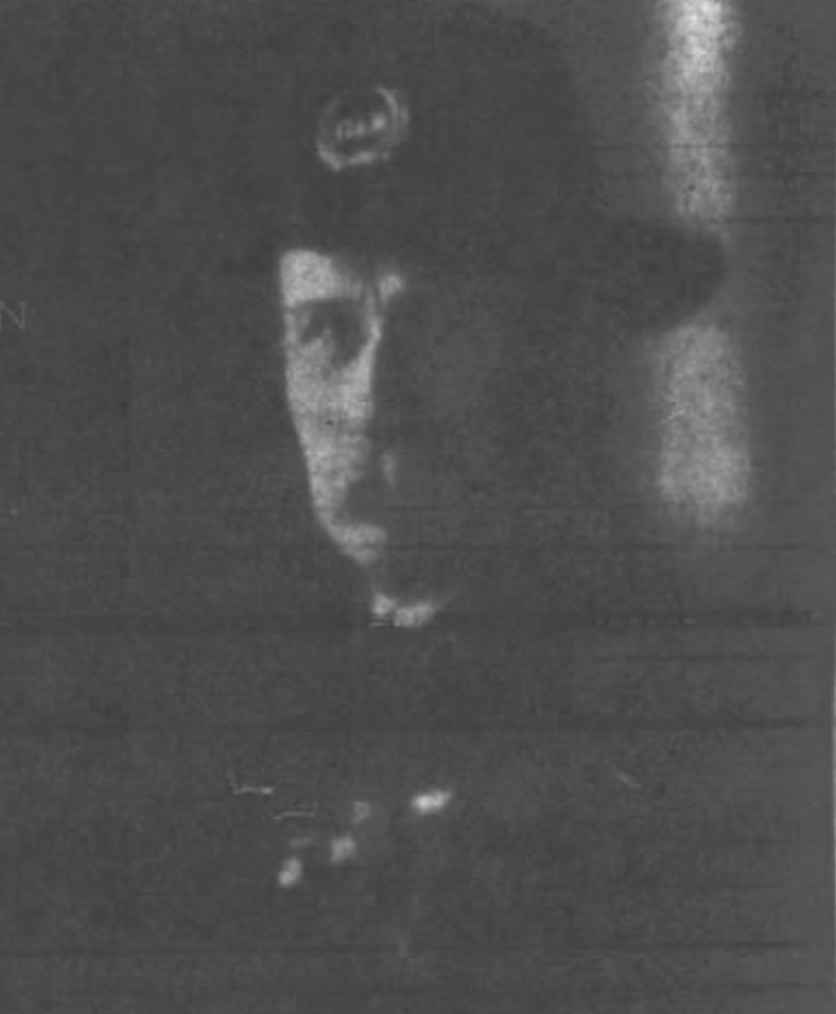
John Harrison Mills in Union uniform, c. 1915

John Harrison Mills (January 11, 1842 – October 23, 1916) was an American artist, businessman and philanthropist who worked in Buffalo, New York, and in Colorado. While he considered himself to be foremost a painter, he also worked in sculpture, sketches, poetry and other writings. His primary occupation was an engraver, making illustrations for publications of the day. He was a partner in a lithography business and an engraving/publishing business, and founded a shipping company for artists.

As a young man, Mills was badly injured in the Second Battle of Bull Run, and he was involved with veterans' groups for the rest of his life, primarily the Grand Army of the Republic (GAR). He was a member of numerous artists' groups, some of which he founded, and he arranged exhibitions and taught art classes. In his later life, Mills became a supporter of the emerging Baháʼí Faith which he helped to establish in Buffalo.

Mills's artworks are known for capturing the time in which he lived. His work depicts the US Civil War and its lasting effects, wilderness landscapes, portraiture, and life scenes. He won a few prizes for his art, pieces of which are in the collections of the Colorado Springs Pioneers Museum, the Albright–Knox Art Gallery, and the Buffalo Fine Arts Academy.

== Early life and education ==
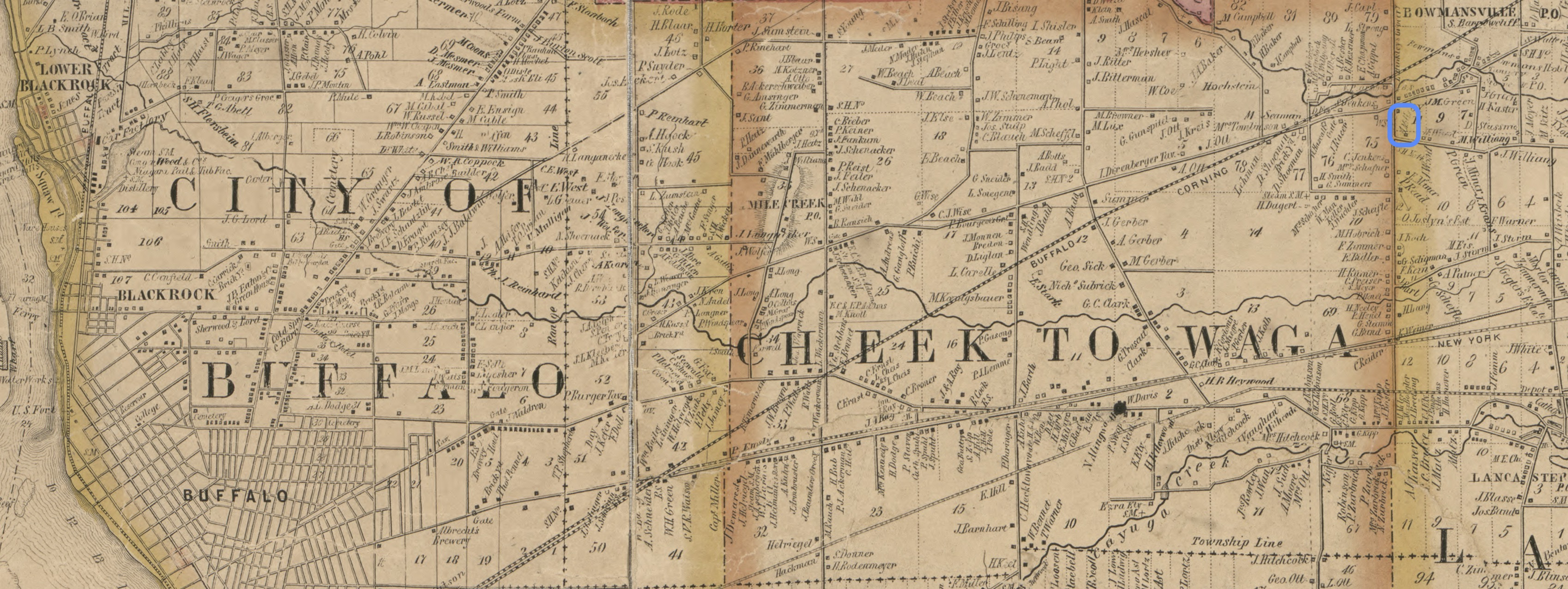
Bownmansville, NY, (top right) relative to Buffalo – A. Mills farm highlighted in aqua near top right

John Harrison Mills was born January 11, 1842, in the hamlet of Bowmansville, New York. He was the first son of Aaron P. Mills and Abigail, both from Otsego County. They were a farming family, which grew with children Daniel W., Elvira, and Aaron T. (born c. 1852). All the children worked on the farm and were raised with a Baptist sensibility of serious-mindedness.

As a child, Mills was known to mold with clay. Early biographer Benedict R. Maryniak wrote:

Long before he could read and write to a teacher's satisfaction, [he] would return from the field and use charred wood to scratch out pictures of things he'd seen. Clay turned up by his plow would be molded info figures of barnyard animals ... people instantly recognized the things he had shaped and sketched.

Abigail had died by late 1855. In 1857, at age 15, Mills moved to Buffalo to become an artist. Maryniak believed Mills's father endorsed this as a step towards developing business sense. Mills became an apprentice bank-note engraver to Jack Jamison, but suffered eye strain. He then took up marble work with sculptor William Lautz and painting with Lars Gustaf Sellstedt and, with encouragement from William H. Beard, began doing portraits. At age 17, Mills painted a portrait of his father. He camped along the Niagara River 1859–1860 and sold paintings. That year in the fall he was noted as a member of the Nameless Club and had given a talk. By December 1860, Mills had rented rooms for a studio in Buffalo, in the Weed Block building.

== War experience ==
After the April 1861 Battle of Fort Sumter, Mills enlisted for the Union in the Civil War, aged 19. On May 8, he mustered out with the 21st New York Volunteer Infantry, which joined the Army of the Potomac for the duration of the war. By May 21, they had established "Camp Buffalo" and then "Fort Buffalo" at Washington, DC. Mills carried out the record keeping of the regiment in the early days of their deployment. He also painted some portraits of soldiers and camps. They took part in the First Battle of Bull Run on July 21, 1861, during which Mills was a private of Company D.

He next fought on August 30, 1862, in the Second Battle of Bull Run. He later recorded personal details of the battle in his Chronicles.

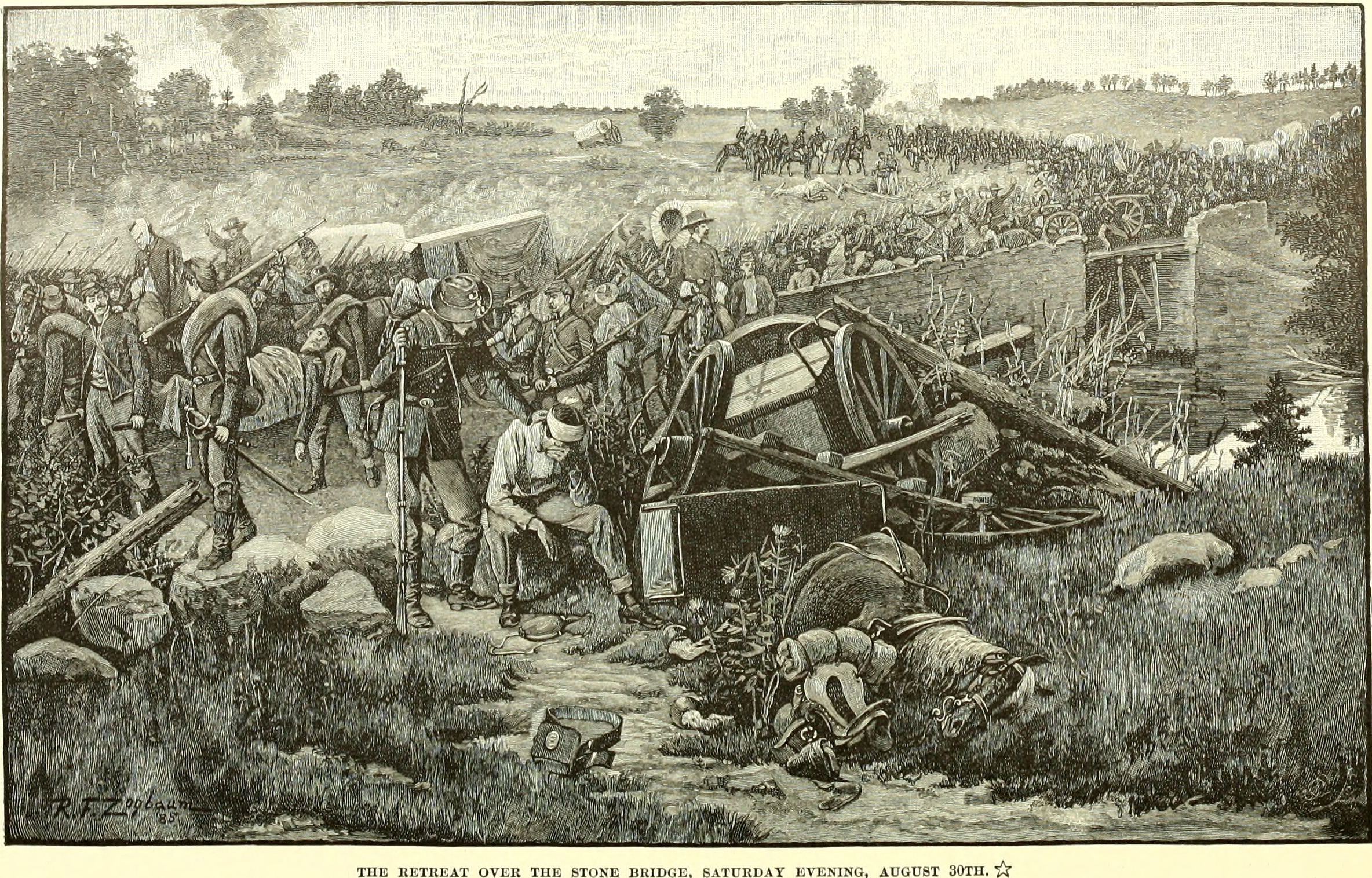
Artistic rendering of the August 30 retreat

we feel the pounding breath of batteries, grape and canister sweep broad gaps in our little line, and it melts like the first snow of winter before this awful wind of bullets.

Mills's company began to engage in hand-to-hand combat at the front line when he was struck down, and evacuated by ambulance as a retreat was called. One report stated that his leg had been shattered, and Mills later called it a knee injury, but it was a bullet lodged through the front of his pelvis which was removed from the back side. "They cut where I told them and when they pulled it out the suction made a noise... a sort of whistle that I will never forget." Some reports were that he nearly died and Mills gained the title "the name who would not die". He was registered as totally disabled.

Mills spent four months recovering and made some drawings which he sold on return to Buffalo. While convalescing, he began the work that led to the Chronicles of the 21st Regiment. He also visited the old Smithsonian Institution during this time and saw George Catlin's Indian and war paintings. Mills was discharged December 22, 1862, and filed paperwork for his military pension, marked as an invalid.

== Artistic career ==
=== Establishment ===
Mills returned to Buffalo and wrote his first notable work, Chronicles of the 21st Regiment of New York. The first edition was published in six parts, from August 1863 to July 1866. Some of the writing was delayed due to complications from his injury and a further serious illness. During this time, Mills continued to paint and was awarded a bronze medal from the New York State Agricultural Society for a painting of a bull.

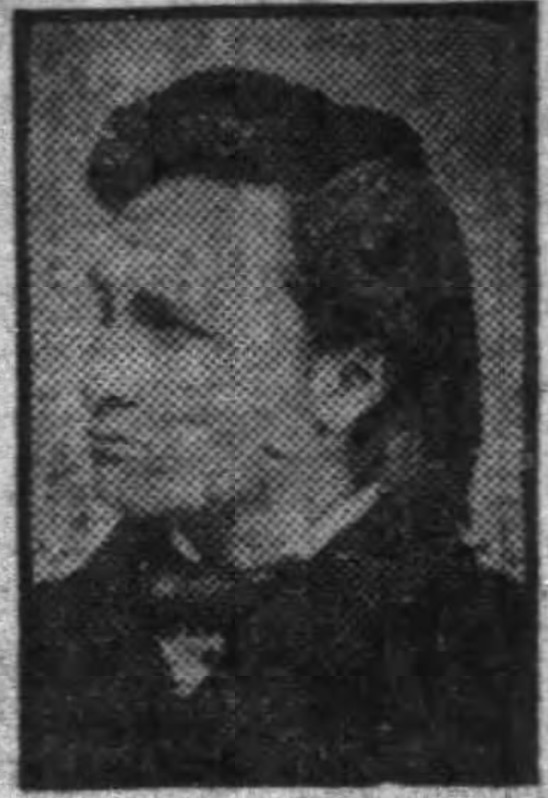
John Harrison Mills, c. 1865

The funeral train of Abraham Lincoln came to Buffalo on April 27, 1865. Mills was an honor guard for the coffin in St. James Hall, despite looking out of place due to his disability and his hair being in the long fashion of an artist rather than a soldier. For two hours while a reception area was being finished, Mills was allowed to sketch Lincoln. From these he made a bust of plaster about ten inches tall. Some gray-tinted copies were made, which were mass reproduced in the fall of 1865. In 1865, Mills was described by the president of the Buffalo Nameless Club (of which he had been a member for more than five years) as "equally at home in sculpture, poesy, and painting. His bust of Abraham Lincoln, his poem of 'Booths', and twin pictures 'A dream of life' each are master pieces of conception and composition."

In 1867, Mills sketched scenes of the Angola Horror railroad disaster for Frank Leslie's Illustrated Newspaper. In 1869, Mills became a partner in a lithography business.

From 1869 to 1872, Mills was on the staff of the Buffalo Morning Express, starting as a copy reader and rising to assistant editor under Samuel Clemens. For a time Mills was responsible for converting drawings into wood-stock for printing, and he reworked Clemen's illustrations for a Buffalo Express series of articles spoofing coverage of a tightrope walker crossing Niagara Falls. During this time, Mills and Clemens were both members of the "Nameless Club" of war veterans. By December 1869, Mills was an elected senior vice-commander of the Grand Army of the Republic (GAR) veterans' association of Post Chaplin in Buffalo.

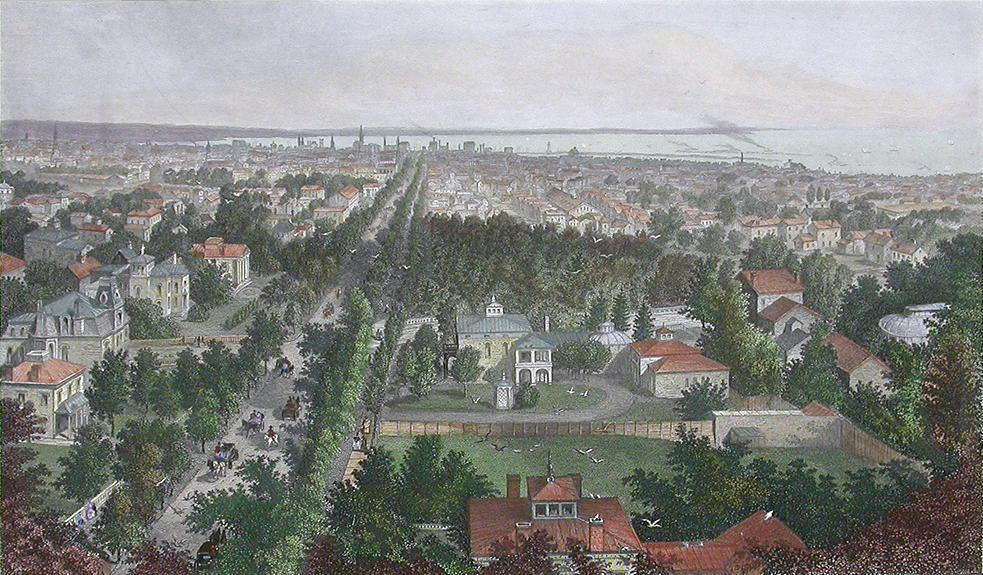
City of Buffalo c. 1873

Mills had married Henrietta Fell, a Canadian, on August 25, 1865. Their first child, Harrison Winthrop, was born c. 1867, followed by Margaret Elvira about a year later. Another daughter Bertha was born in 1869 but died after a few months. The family lived in the home of Henrietta's father, a civil engineer. Henrietta suffered illness and in summer 1872, due to concerns for her health, the family moved to Colorado, where Mills's brother Aaron had an engraving company.

=== Frontier artist ===
Mills bought 5 acres of land in town. He took a prize at the Art Department of Colorado's Agricultural Fair, and painted a sheep for a stockmen's show. A poem of his was published in Denver's Rocky Mountain News. In 1873, Mills was joined by Buffalo artist Hamilton Hamilton, and together they sold art during the year. They went on the Upper Arkansas expedition invited by the Chain & Hardy Bookshop owners. Mills took other horse trips into the mountains to paint water colors, and by 1873 offered art classes in Denver.

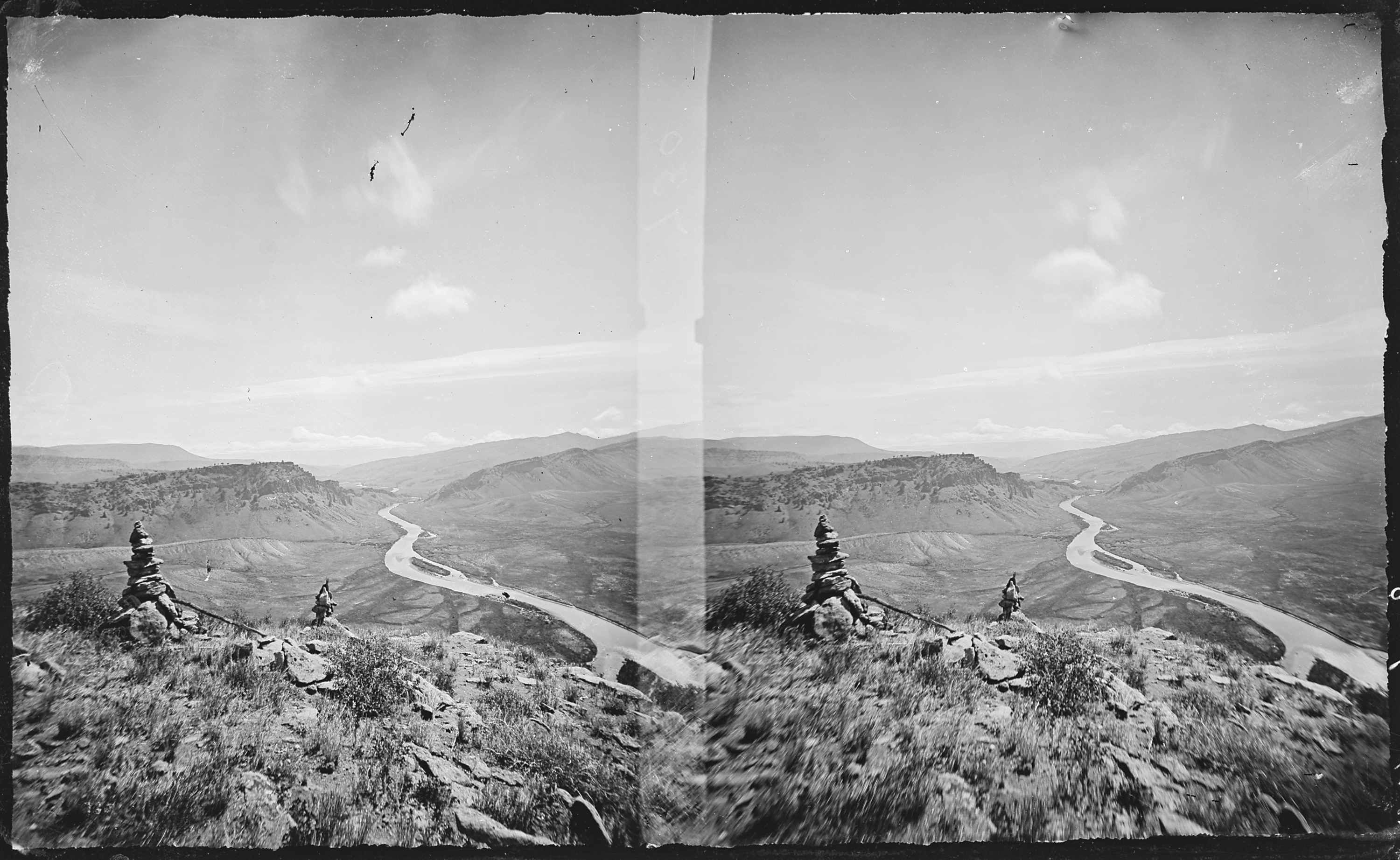
Stereoscopic view east from hot springs, Middle Park, 1874

Mills continued to sell paintings and contributed art and articles to publications, while periodically travelling into the mountains to sketch. As his wife's health improved, they bought a wagon and began to travel the lands. They made a trip to the Colorado Basin, called "Middle Park", and found a place to make a homestead. Around 1874 they were living in what was then called Hot Sulphur Springs, where Henrietta held a school. This later became the subject of his painting "First School in Middle Park". However, while the scenery was rich and inspiring, there was no local market for his art and it was a difficult life. At one point, Mills suffered from rheumatic fever and had to be rescued by hunters.

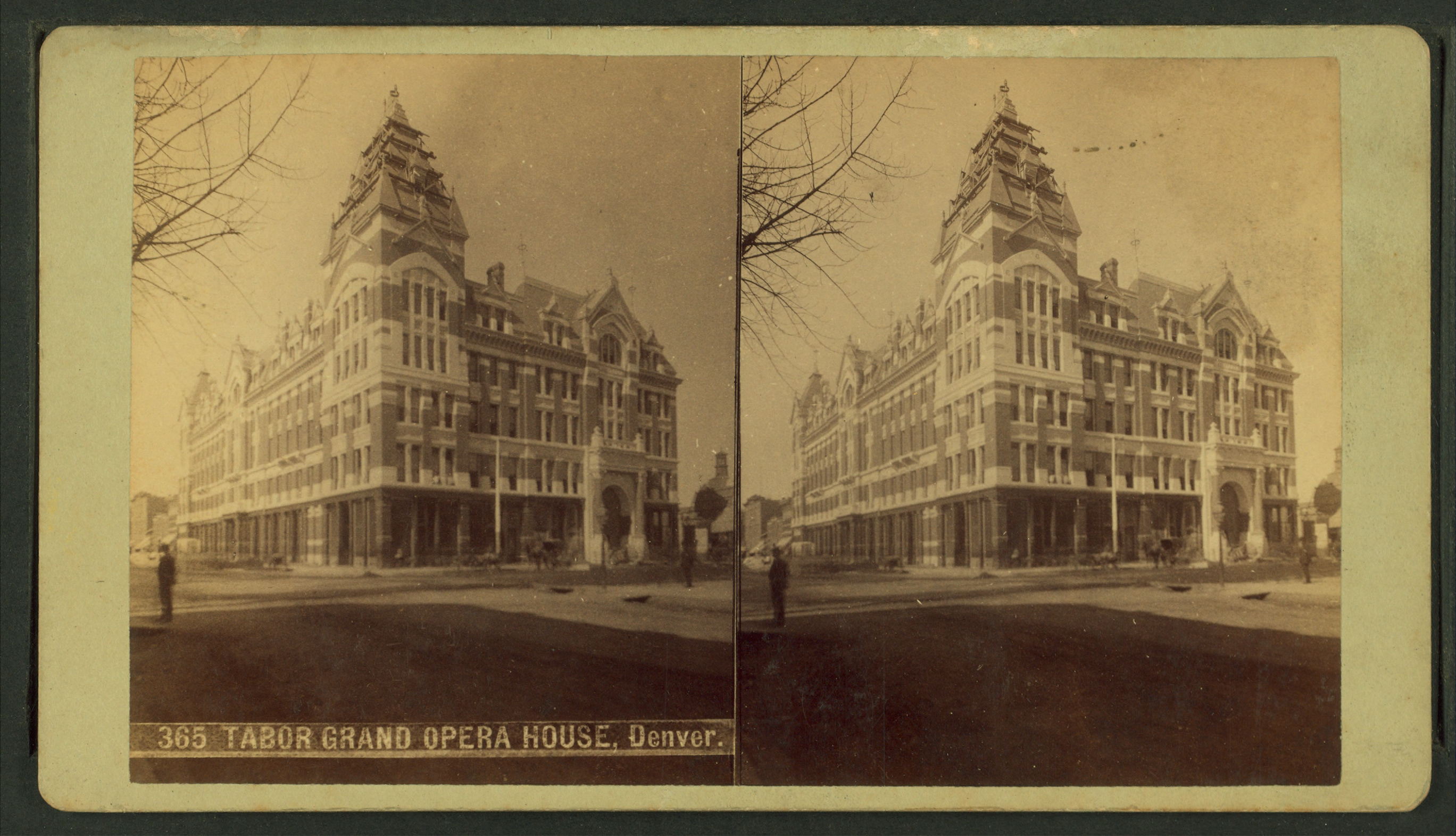
Stereoptic view of Tabor Grand Opera House

In 1876, the family moved into a brick house in Denver and Mills took a studio at what later grew to become the Tabor Grand Opera House. Mills organized short-lived art schools and associations. He was also appointed a probate judge, seemingly on his reputation for mediating differences between whites and Ute people, and also became secretary of the local Republican party.

Engraving was his success in these times. Mills sold wood engravings and writing to Scribner's Monthly and Harper's Magazine. In particular, a 12-page article in Scribner's with mostly his own sketches with the story "Hunting the Mule-Deer in Colorado" was published in September 1978. He sold another illustrated article for the October 1879 Scribner's titled "The Camp of the Carbonates". Mills was commissioned by George Crofutt to do illustrations and wood-engravings for several guidebooks, among which the 1881 "Colorado Springs, Pike's Peak Sunset", was called his greatest wood-engraving. The engraving/publishing company Mills was a partner in expanded in 1881, and Mills was also co-owner of a publishing shop in Denver.

In January 1882, Mills's painting "Frontier School" was reported sold to Wolfe Londoner, later mayor of Denver, for $1000 (more than $25,000 in 2020 dollars). Mills did multiple "pioneer-life dugout" paintings including "News from Home" (1882) which is now in the Colorado Springs Pioneers Museum. As president of the Academy of Fine Arts of Colorado, Mills worked with state senator and mining tycoon Horace Tabor to set up the Mining and Industrial Exposition in the summers of 1882 and 1883. Mills taught through the Academy as well, holding meetings in the Tabor Opera House building. Among his students was political caricaturist Albert Wilbur Steele. Despite the short-lived nature of some groups he founded – such as the Colorado Academy of Design, which suffered from conflicts – Mills had great influence in developing artists and an art market in Colorado.

Henrietta's health returned and she bore a third child – John Eghert – on June 19, 1882. In July 1883, Henrietta was a delegate from the Denver chapter of the Ladies Auxiliary to the national meeting. The Woman's Relief Corps was established by the GAR at Farragut Post, chartered with Mills present. Henrietta was a charter member and founded the Colorado state chapter in the Mills home in Denver, becoming its first president. (It was named the Farragut Corps [after Farragut Post].) In October, Mills wrote an article reporting on the organization and local militia groups. In mid-December Mills aided the organization of the GAR corp in Delta, Colorado, and in late December Mills was elected commander of the Farragut GAR corps.

=== Exhibition organizer ===
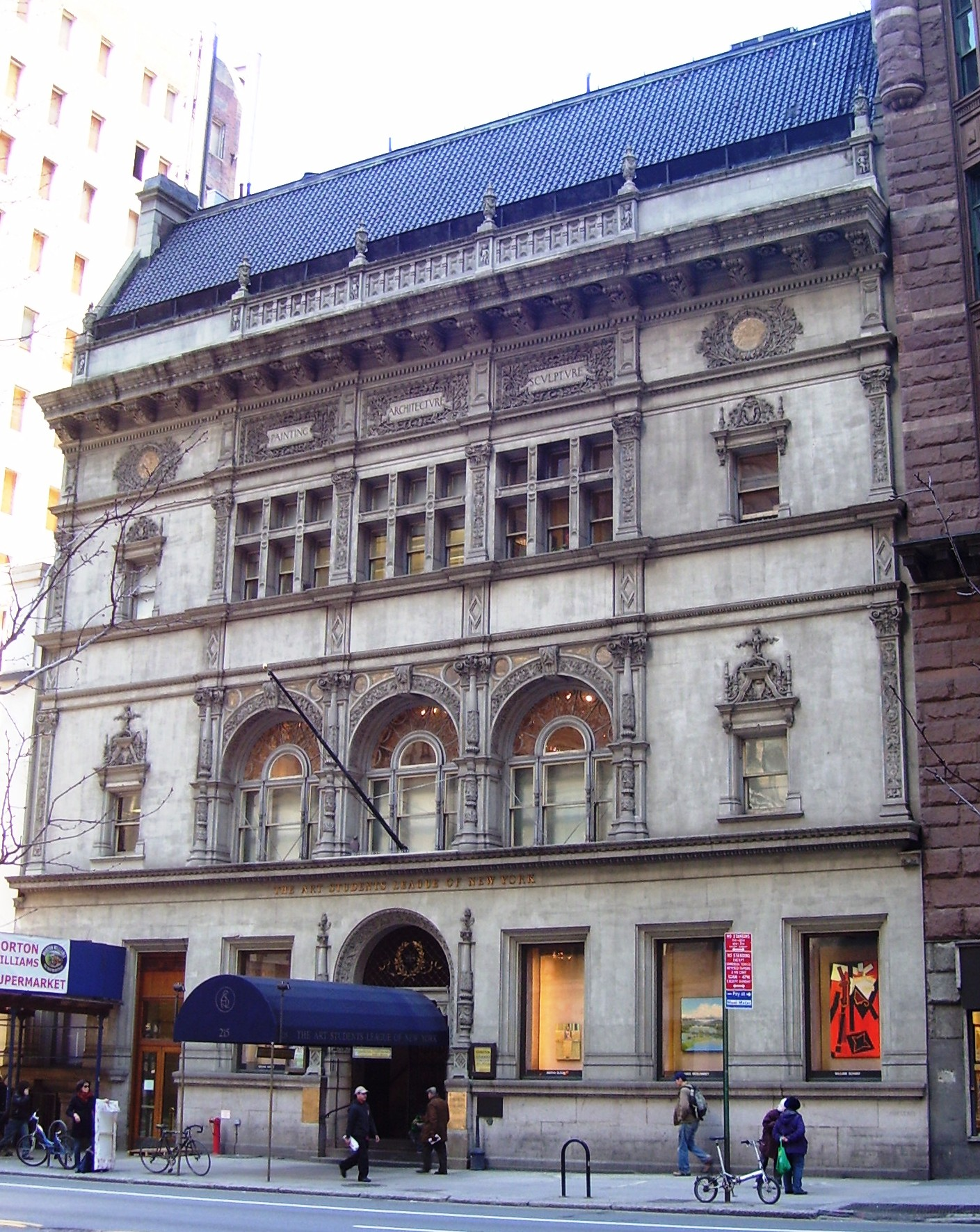
American Fine Arts Society Building, built 1891–92

Exhibitions at the American Art Association in New York City (c. 1885–1888) spread Mills's reputation and he moved to Manhattan where he was invited to the founding of the New York Art Guild, becoming its general manager under president Thomas Moran. In 1889, the American Fine Arts Society was incorporated in New York with Mills among the trustees. He held a similar position when the New York Art Guid incorporated in 1891. Mills commented at this time that he was too busy for more than brief trips into the countryside for inspiration.

In 1892, Mills was coordinating the New York component of the country's contribution to the World of Art exhibition at the Smithsonian in Washington, where Henrietta hosted a White House reception for the artists. Mills had also opened a shipping company for artists (which was taken over by his son Harrison by 1898). In June, Mills contributed the painting "On the Croquet Ground of Central Park" toward fundraising for Grant's Tomb. He exhibited at the World's Columbian Exposition of 1893 in Chicago. Mills organized many art exhibitions during this time, including the 1898 "Art Kalendarium" exhibition series for the New York Art Guild.

In 1895, Mills organized a retreat for art students at a summer home in Rothesay, New Brunswick, then organized an art school and student's exhibition series. In August 1897, a bicyclist ran into Mills and his arm was broken.

By April 1901, Mills had moved to Westford, New York, where Henrietta had formed a branch of the Sunshine Society club (a service club which often worked with the blind). In 1902, Mills won a $100 prize from the New York Herald for best poem on the anniversary of the Battle of Gettysburg. His poem, "The Third Day", did not have universal critical acclaim, but it was widely circulated and brought Mills considerable publicity. It ends:

They laid the wounded on the floor,

The little house would hold no more:
The little maid was not afraid,
But the tender eyes ran o'er;
The spent shot swept the town,
With the dying she lay down;
The little maid smiled – she was not afraid

To die as the sun went down

=== Buffalo artistic community ===
In 1904, Mills and his wife moved back to Buffalo. Now in his sixties, Mills hosted artists, and held artists' meetings and exhibitions in his house, often on a weekly basis. A profile of Mills in the 1905 Artists Year Book, published in Chicago, noted that he had exhibited at the National Academy of Design in New York and was a member of professional arts clubs including New York's Salmagundi Club and some Philadelphia clubs. Mills continued to paint largely creating portraits at this time. He also taught a class on clay modeling and exhibited the work of his art students.

Mills became a founding director of the Artists and Illustrators Club of Buffalo, and joined the Buffalo Historical Society. Mills was also active with the Buffalo Society of Artists, with which he exhibited some paintings. Mills exhibited several times at the Albright Gallery. Among the groups the Mills hosted was the Progressive Thought League. Its 1908 business meeting was held at their home, and Mills was listed as the vice-president.

In January 1910, Mills presented a painting of the new commander of the Chapin Post at a GAR reception. In 1911, Mills visited Bull Run for the 50th anniversary of the battles there, and made some commemorative portraits. Mills wrote a memorial poem for Gettysburg, "To the devoted departed". He was honored at a GAR gathering for Gettysburg, and later at a reunion of veterans of the 21st Regiment. He remained an elected officer of the GAR corps until his death.

Mills joined the Guild of Allied Arts in January 1916. In March, Mills wrote a booklet on the early artists of Colorado.

== Promotion of Buffalo Baháʼí community ==
Mills stated that had been interested in the Baháʼí Faith since 1898, when he was living in New York City. Mills may have been introduced to the religion through his daughter Margaret's husband, Charles Sprague, who had been an active Baháʼí in New York in 1900. Margaret moved to Buffalo in March 1906, and a series of talks by her the following month were the first mentions of the Baháʼí Faith in local newspapers. This was about the time that the first meetings of the Baháʼís were later credited as beginning.

The Mills sought to have more Baháʼís to work with. Religious scholar Robert Stockman summarized a November 1906 letter to Henrietta from the Baháʼí House of Spirituality of Chicago (a precursor of the Baháʼí administrative institution the Local Spiritual Assembly) as: "We don't know of any believers there."

Margaret spoke at the Progressive Thought League (organized that year by Elizabeth Marney Conner and Grace Carew Sheldon), and presented a paper which was published in the local newspaper. By mid-July, Margaret was vice-president of the League.

Through August 1906, the Mills hosted Baháʼí Alma Knobloch, who promoted that faith through publications in local newspapers and meetings held at the Mills home.

Margaret wrote to ʻAbdu'l-Bahá, the head of the religion, expressing her wish for martyrdom. Before she received a reply, Margaret suffered a night of hysteria and broke her arm while running from her parents' house; she was placed in a state hospital.

In April and May 1907, Mills gave the talks: "Bahais [sic] at home and abroad" and a talk on the religion's "mission as a unifier of all faiths". The following year he gave an extended talk at the League, "Basis of the Bahai Faith" which was published in the Buffalo Times. Mills counted some 35 people as the Buffalo Baháʼí community, and called the faith the "cord which binds all faiths in God as One". Baháʼí literature could be obtained free from Mills's home.

Mills represented the Buffalo Baháʼís at the national convention in March 1909, where he voted for the precursor of the national organization of Baháʼís. Regular Baháʼí meetings continued at the Mills home. He was described as the president of the local Baháʼí community and his meetings were listed in first editions of Star of the West (the national Baháʼí magazine). In June 1912, Mills received ʻAbdu'l-Bahá in Buffalo. The meetings at the home continued after Mills's death, and some visitors from abroad referred to it as the "Bahai center".

== Death and remembrance ==
Mills died on October 23, 1916. His absence was noted in a poem published in November. The Art Institute of Chicago exhibition showed his work in December. A group of Civil War veterans marched the following summer in remembrance of Mills and others who had been lost.

Biographer Nelson A. Reiger called Mills a "highly intelligent, deeply caring, sensitive man, greatly motivated, widely experience[d]". An exhibition on Mills with newspaper clippings and art was held at the Denver Public Library in the early 1930s.

There was renewed interest in Mills c. 1992 with the rediscovery of When Mark Twain lived in Buffalo, and his "Campsite in the Rockies" painting was included in the Western America: Landscapes and Indians collection for 1994–1998. Biographies began to appear. "From Bowmansville and back: the odyssey of John Harrison Mills" (1999) and "The Most Humane of Humans: Mark Twain and John Harrison Mills" (2002) were published in the Buffalo area. The review says that Mills's original text When Mark Twain lived in Buffalo, remains unknown except for the excerpts printed in newspapers. These excerpts were reprinted by the Western New York Heritage Institute's magazine. A 2004 biographical review of Mark Twain noted Mills.

In 2009, a biography of Mills's early years as a Colorado painter was published. The Huntington Library in San Marino, California, exhibited a painting of Mills in 2011.

The holdings of Mills's work continue to be found at Albright-Knox Gallery and Colorado Springs Pioneers Museums.

== Notable works ==
=== Poetry ===
- Booths
- Poem about 1871, title unknown (1873)
- Over the Range (1874)
- "Colorado" (1880)
- "The Third Day" (year unknown)
- "What they did to the flag" (year unknown)
- "Uplift" (year unknown)
- "To the devoted departed" (year unknown)

=== Other writings ===
- Chronicles of the 21st Regiment, published in five parts (1863–1866)
- "Indian Summer" (1874)
- "Hunting the Mule-Deer in Colorado" (1878) 12-page story with illustrations for Scribner's Monthly
- "The Camp of the Carbonates" (1879) story with illustrations for Scribner's Monthly
- When Mark Twain lived in Buffalo(1910)

=== Sculpture ===
- Death bust of Abraham Lincoln, 1865
- Bust of Jesse Ketchum (year unknown)

=== Paintings ===
- Painting of a bull (title and year unknown), received a bronze medal from the New York State Agricultural Society in 1864.
- A dream of life
- Portrait of Mark Twain, title unknown (1870)
- Painting of a sheep (title unknown, 1873)
- Painting of "Boulder Falls" (title and year unknown)
- "East on the So. Boulder"
- "West on the Grand"
- "Artist Painting a Satirical Painting"
- "First School in Middle Park" (1876)
- "Through fire and flood" (1878)
- "Frontier School" (year unknown)
- "News from Home" (1882)
- "Morgan Road (year unknown)
- "Forgotten Martyrs" (year unknown)
- "the Captive" (year unknown)
- "Embarkation at the Street" (year unknown)
- "His Father a Soldier" (year unknown)
- "Campsite in the Rockies" (1887)
- "Portrait of Henrietta Fell Mills" [his wife], 1889
- Portrait of Charles Walter Couldock (1888)
- "On the Croquet Ground of Central Park" (year unknown)
- Portrait of the youngest son of Seneca Chief Red Jacket (1906)
- Portrait of Baháʼí 'Abdu'l-Karim (1908)
- "Peace Resurgent" (year unknown)

=== Sketches and illustrations ===
- Viewing the remains of the victims of the Angola Disaster for Identification, at the Soldier's Rest, Buffalo (1867)
- Untitled humorous sketch of a policeman 'brawling' with kids
- "Life and scenes in Denver, Colorado", 1873 illustrations for Frank Leslie's Weekly
- "A street scene – buying outfits for the mountains and the mines", 1873 illustrations for Frank Leslie's Weekly
- "Hunting the Mule Deer" (1876) for The Century Magazine

=== Engravings ===
- Illustrations for "Chicago Lakes, below Towering Mount Evans" (1880)
- Illustrations for "Colorado Springs, Pike's Peak Sunset" (1881)
- Illustrations for "Nearing Kenosha Hill, Union Pacific Railway" (1881)
- Illustrations for "South Park from Kenosha Hill" (1881)
