= James Nicholls =

James Nicholls may refer to:

- James Fawckner Nicholls (1818–1883), English antiquarian and librarian
- James Nicholls (footballer) (1908–1984), English football goalkeeper
- James Nicholls (rugby league) (1915-1982), rugby league player of the 1940s
- Jim Nicholls (1919–2002), English football goalkeeper

== See also ==
- James Nichols (disambiguation)
- Jamie Nicholls (disambiguation)
