= Alex Nicholls =

Alex Nicholls may refer to:

- Alex Nicholls (footballer) (born 1987), English footballer
- Alex Nicholls (academic) (born 1964), lecturer in social entrepreneurship at the University of Oxford
- Alex Nicholls (rugby union) (born 1961), Zimbabwean rugby union player
