= USS Falmouth =

Sloops-of-war of the United States Navy

History

United States
- Name: USS Falmouth
- Builder: Boston Navy Yard
- Launched: 3 November 1827
- Decommissioned: 24 May 1859
- Fate: Sold, 1863

General characteristics
- Type: Sloop of war
- Displacement: 703 long tons (714 t)
- Length: 127 ft (39 m)
- Beam: 33 ft 9 in (10.29 m)
- Draft: 16 ft (4.9 m)
- Propulsion: Sail
- Complement: 190 officers and enlisted
- Armament: 24 × 24-pounder guns

USS Falmouth was a sloop of war in the United States Navy during the mid-19th century.

Falmouth was launched on 3 November 1827 by Boston Navy Yard, and declared ready for sea 19 January 1828, Commander C. W. Morgan in command.

Between 1828 and 1840, Falmouth made two cruises with the West Indies Squadron and two with the Pacific Squadron. Between cruises, she was in ordinary for repairs and refittings at either New York or Norfolk or Norfolk Navy Yard.

Recommissioned after such a period in ordinary 16 December 1841, Falmouth joined the recently organized Home Squadron. Falmouth cruised from the Banks of Newfoundland to the mouth of the Amazon and in the Caribbean and Gulf of Mexico with this squadron until 1846, aside from necessary repair periods. She operated chiefly in the Gulf of Mexico, carrying messages and government officials, convoying Army transports to Texas, and protecting American interests in Mexico. From September 1845 to March 1846, she was flagship for the squadron's commander, Commodore David Conner. During the opening months of the Mexican–American War, from April to September 1846, she blockaded Mexican ports, then sailed north for repairs. She lay in ordinary at Boston from 22 November 1846 until recommissioned on 26 April 1849.

Sailing for the Pacific on 16 May 1849, Falmouth protected the new American settlements on the west coast, and voyaged to various Pacific islands before returning to Norfolk on 29 January 1852. Again she lay in ordinary, from 4 February 1852 until 18 November 1854.

Between 16 December 1854 and August 1855 Falmouth cruised through the West Indies in an unsuccessful search for news of Albany, missing since September. Returning to New York, she was in ordinary until 12 January 1857, when she was recommissioned for service on the Brazil Station. Falmouth joined in the Paraguay expedition to Paraguay late in 1858, when relations with the United States were strained, and cruised in the Paraná River and the Río de la Plata until tension eased. She sailed into New York Harbor on 19 May 1859, and on the 24th was decommissioned.

Fitted out as a stationary storeship, Falmouth departed New York on 1 April 1860 for Aspinwall, Panama, the port later known as Colón. She served there as store ship for operating in the Gulf of Mexico, until sold in October 1863.

== Narrative Accounts ==
- Lars Gustaf Sellstedt described his life onboard from 1837 to 1840 in his autobiography (1904) From Forecastle to Academy: Sailor and Artist. Buffalo, NY: Matthews-Northrup Works, pp 131–203.
