= Paul Nicholls =

Paul Nicholls may refer to:

- Paul Nicholls (actor) (born 1979), English actor
- Paul Nicholls (horse racing) (born 1962), British National Hunt horse trainer
- Paul Nicholls (sportsman) (1946–2009), Australian cricketer/WAFL footballer

== See also ==
- Paul Nichols (born 1981), American college football coach and former player
- Paul F. Nichols (born 1952), American politician
- Paul Nicolas (1899–1959), French international footballer
- Paul Nicholas (born 1944), English actor and singer
- Paul Nicholson (disambiguation)
