= Henry Nichols =

Henry Nichols may refer to:

- Henry E. Nichols (died 1899), U.S. Navy officer and the commander of the Department of Alaska
- Henry F. C. Nichols (1833–1890), American politician
- Henry L. Nichols (1823–1915), American physician and Democratic politician from California
- Hank Nichols (1936–2026), American basketball referee
- Hobart Nichols (Henry Hobart Nichols, Jr., 1869–1962), American landscape painter and illustrator

== See also ==
- Harry Sidney Nichols (died 1939), antiquarian book dealer and publisher and printer of high-end erotica
- Henry Nicols (1973–2000), haemophiliac who became a campaigner for fellow AIDS victims
- Henry Nicholls (disambiguation)
