= Matthew Nicholls =

Matthew or Matt Nicholls may refer to:

- Mathew Nicholls, Australian rules football field umpire
- Matthew Nicholls (classicist) (born 1978), professor of classics
- Matt Nicholls, English drummer for Bring Me the Horizon

== See also ==
- Matt Nichols (born 1987), American player of Canadian football
