= Joe Nicholls =

Joe Nicholls may refer to:

- Joe Nicholls (footballer, born 1905) (1905–1973), English footballer for Darlaston, Northfleet United, Tottenham Hotspur and Bristol Rovers
- Joe Nicholls (footballer, fl. 1914–1925), English footballer for Clapton Orient

== See also ==
- Joe Nichols, American country music artist
- Joseph Nichols, New Zealand soldier and cricketer
- Joe Nichols (journalist), American sports journalist
