= Burr H. Nicholls =

American painter (1848–1915)

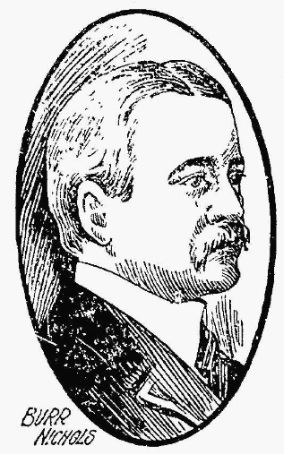
- Born: December 9, 1848; Lockport, New York, U.S.
- Died: May 12, 1915 (aged 66); Stamford, Connecticut, U.S.
- Education: Carolus-Duran
- Spouse: Rhoda Holmes Nicholls

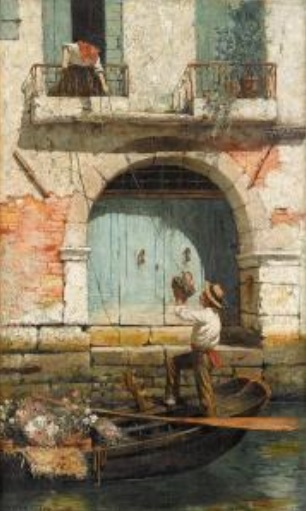
Burr H. Nicholls, The Flower Seller, Venice, 1883

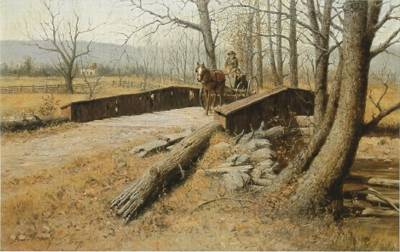
Burr H. Nicholls, An Old New England Bridge

Burr H. Nicholls (December 9, 1848 – May 12, 1915) was an American painter who studied art with Carolus-Duran in Paris and first exhibited his work in London at Dudley Gallery. Most of his works were based upon scenes from the seven years that he studied and lived in Europe.

Nicholls was married three times, but it was his marriage to his second wife, Rhoda Holmes Nicholls, that caused a media sensation across the United States. In 1897 both Burr and Rhoda Nicholls submitted paintings to the Paris Salon; Rhoda's was accepted with honorable mention but Burr's was rejected. This triggered a period of marital discontent followed by separation. Their divorce was finalized in 1906 and was reported in many American newspapers. Journalists warned women of the peril of pursuing vocations that put them in competition with their husbands.

== Early life ==
Burr H. Nicholls was born in Lockport, New York to Luman Nicholls and Ann Halliday Nicholls. Painters in his family included his mother and his nephew Henry, son of his brother Mark. Henry made copies of several of Burr's paintings including a Brittany farm scene and The Red Staircase.

== Marriage ==
His first of three marriages was to Alice McDonald or Alethea P. McConnell in 1871; she died in 1876.

Nicholls met the English artist Rhoda Holmes during a trip to Venice. They married in 1884 at Lyminster Church in Sussex, England, honeymooned in Venice and sailed for the United States in the spring of 1884.

The couple exhibited their works in some of the same shows, like the Chicago Interstate Industrial Expositions. In 1893 the Nicholls lived in a "cosey" home and both had studios on the top floor. By 1896, Nicholls lived with his wife in a West 50th Street mansion in New York City with their daughter and son, Rhoda Olive and Arundel Holmes Nicholls.

The couple's marriage became contentious when in 1897 one of Rhoda Holmes Nicholls works was accepted with honorable mention by the Paris Salon, but Burr's work was denied. The couple separated the following year. (Note: In 1898 he and his mother lived in the same house in Lockport, New York. and in 1902 he had an art studio in the Coal & Iron Exchange Building in Buffalo.) Their divorce was finalized by September 18, 1906 and "newspapers widely warned women about the dangers of success and its potential influence on marital and domestic bliss."

His final marriage was to Josephine Lewis of Buffalo, New York. Her brother was Dr. Park Lewis, a "well-known physician".

== Education and career ==
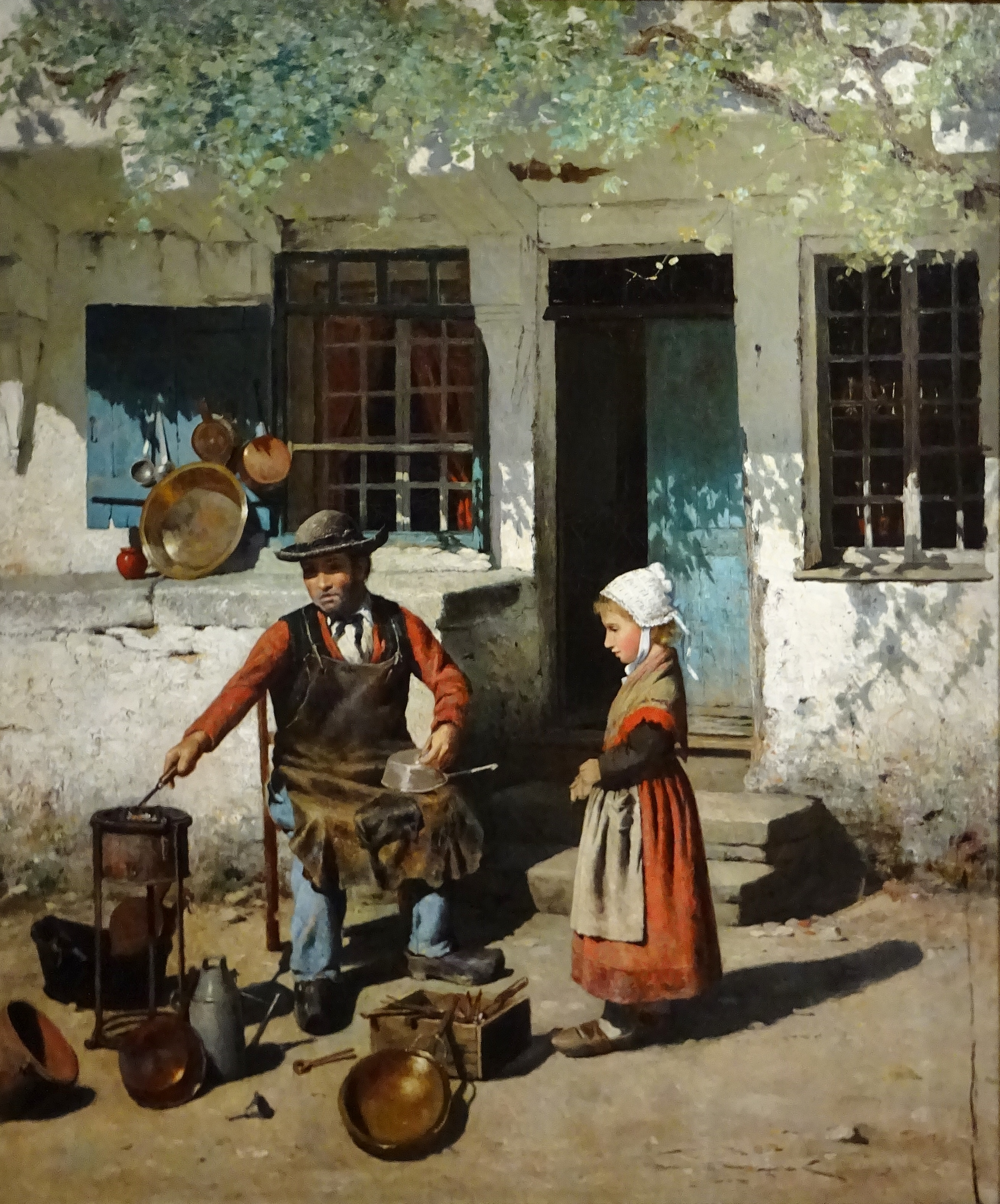
Buur H. Nicholls ː Le rétameur (vers 1881-1882, huile sur toile, musée de Pont-Aven).

Nicholls studied art in Buffalo, New York with Lars (L.G.) Sellstedt and with Carolus-Duran at the Paris Beaux Arts. He studied and worked in England, Paris, Italy and Brittany for seven years which provided inspiration for his paintings for years. Most of Nicholl's paintings were made of European subjects and settings, like A Street Scene in France and A Quiet Corner, Venice, exhibited at the Pan-American Exposition of 1901 held in Buffalo, New York.

His first exhibition was in 1879 at London's Dudley Gallery. Nicholls exhibited at "every important exhibition in America" and the Paris Salon. His work was favorably received at the 1891 Society for the Promotion of Art exhibition at Eden Musée [New York].

The Buffalo Fine Arts Academy, now the Albright-Knox Art Gallery, had acquired works by Nicholls by 1882.

He and his third wife were members of the Buffalo Historical Society.

== Death ==
Nicholls died in May, 1915 in Lockport, New York. (Note: The Union List of Artists Names records Stamford, Connecticut as the place of death.)

== Collections ==
- Albright–Knox Art Gallery: Hunting up a Quotation and A Group of Fowls
- Peabody Institute: The Vegetable Garden
- Pennsylvania Academy of the Fine Arts: Effect of Sunlight

Andrew Carnegie and Parisian M. Johannot were collectors of his works.
