= Jamie Nicholls =

Jamie Nicholls may refer to:

- Jamie Nicholls (politician) (born 1971), Canadian politician
- Jamie Nicholls (snowboarder) (born 1993), British snowboarder

== See also ==
- James Nicholls (disambiguation)
