= Alex Nicholls (academic) =

Alex Nicholls (born 10 July 1964) is a professor of social entrepreneurship at Saïd Business School, University of Oxford, a fellow of Harris Manchester College and a member of the Skoll Centre for Social Entrepreneurship. He was the first staff member of the Skoll Centre.

== Research ==
Nicholls' research interests range across several key areas within social entrepreneurship, including: the interface between the public and social sectors; organisational legitimacy and governance; the development of social finance markets; and impact measurement and innovation. Nicholls is widely published in peer-reviewed journals and has done consultancy work for not-for-profits, social enterprises, and the UK government. He is the co-author of a major research book on Fair Trade (with Charlotte Opal, Sage, 2005). His 2006 edition of a collection of key papers on the state of the art of social entrepreneurship globally was published in paperback edition by Oxford University Press in 2008.

Nicholls has held lectureships at a wide variety of academic institutions including at the University of Toronto, Leeds Metropolitan University, University of Surrey and Aston Business School.

He has been a Fellow of the Academy of Marketing Science and Member of the Institute for Learning and Teaching in Higher Education. Nicholls also sat on the regional social enterprise expert group for the South East of England and is a non executive director of a major Fair Trade company.

== Peer-reviewed journal articles ==
- Nicholls, A (2002), 'Strategic Options in Fair Trade Retailing', International Journal of Retail and Distribution Management (2002), 30.1, pp. 6–17
- Nicholls, A., and Cullen, P. (2004) 'The Child-Parent Purchase Relationship: Pester Power, Human Rights and Retail Ethics', Journal of Retailing and Consumer Services, 11, pp. 75–86
- Nicholls, A. (2004), 'Fair Trade New Product Development', Service Industries Journal, 24.2, pp. 102–117
- Nicholls, A., and Watson, A. (2005) 'Implementing E-Value Strategies in UK Retailing', International Journal of Retail and Distribution Management, 33.6, pp. 426–443
- Nicholls, A. (2006), 'Playing the Field: A New Approach to the Meaning of Social Entrepreneurship', Social Enterprise Journal, 2.1, pp. 1–5
- Nicholls, A., and Alexander, A. (2007) ‘ Rediscovering Consumer-Producer Involvement: A Network Perspective on Fair Trade Marketing in the UK ', European Journal of Marketing, 40.11-12, pp.1236–1253
- Nicholls, A., and Lee N. (2007) 'Purchase Decision-Making in Fair Trade and the "Ethical Gap"', Journal of Strategic Marketing, 14, pp. 369–386

== Books ==
- Nicholls, A., and Opal, C. (2005), Fair Trade: Market-Driven Ethical Consumption, London: Sage
- Nicholls, A. (ed) (2008), Social Entrepreneurship: New Models of Sustainable Social Change, Paperback Edition, Oxford University Press

== Book chapters ==
- Nicholls, A. (2004), 'Social Entrepreneurship: The Emerging Landscape', in Financial Times Handbook of Management: Third Edition (2004), pp. 636–43
- Nicholls, A. (2006), 'Introduction: The Nature of Social Entrepreneurship', in Nicholls, A. (ed.), Social Entrepreneurship: New Models of Sustainable Social Change, Oxford University Press, pp. 1–35
- Nicholls, A., and Cho, A. (2006), 'Social Entrepreneurship: The Structuration of a Field', in Nicholls, A. (ed), Social Entrepreneurship: New Models of Sustainable Social Change, Oxford University Press, pp. 99–118
- Nicholls, A. (2006), 'Social Entrepreneurship', in Carter, S. and Evans-Jones, D. (eds.), Enterprise and Small Business: Principles, Practice and Policy. 2nd Edition, FT Prentice Hall, pp. 220–242
- Nicholls, A. (2008), 'Capturing the Performance of the Socially Entrepreneurial Organisation (SEO): An Organisational Legitimacy Approach', in Robinson, J., Mair, J., and Hockerts, K. (eds), International Perspectives on Social Entrepreneurship Research, Palgrave MacMillan (forthcoming)
- Nicholls, A., and Young, R. (2008), 'Introduction: The Changing Landscape of Social Entrepreneurship', in Nicholls, A. (ed.), Social Entrepreneurship: New Models of Sustainable Social Change, Paperback Edition, Oxford University Press
- Nicholls, A. (Ed.). (2008). Social entrepreneurship: New models of sustainable social change. OUP Oxford.

== Other publications ==
- Nicholls, A. (2007), What is the Future of Social Enterprise in Ethical Markets?, London, Office of The Third Sector.
- Nicholls, A., and Pharaoh, C. (2007), The Landscape of Social Finance, Skoll Centre for Social Entrepreneurship Research Paper.
