= Danni Nicholls =

British singer-songwriter

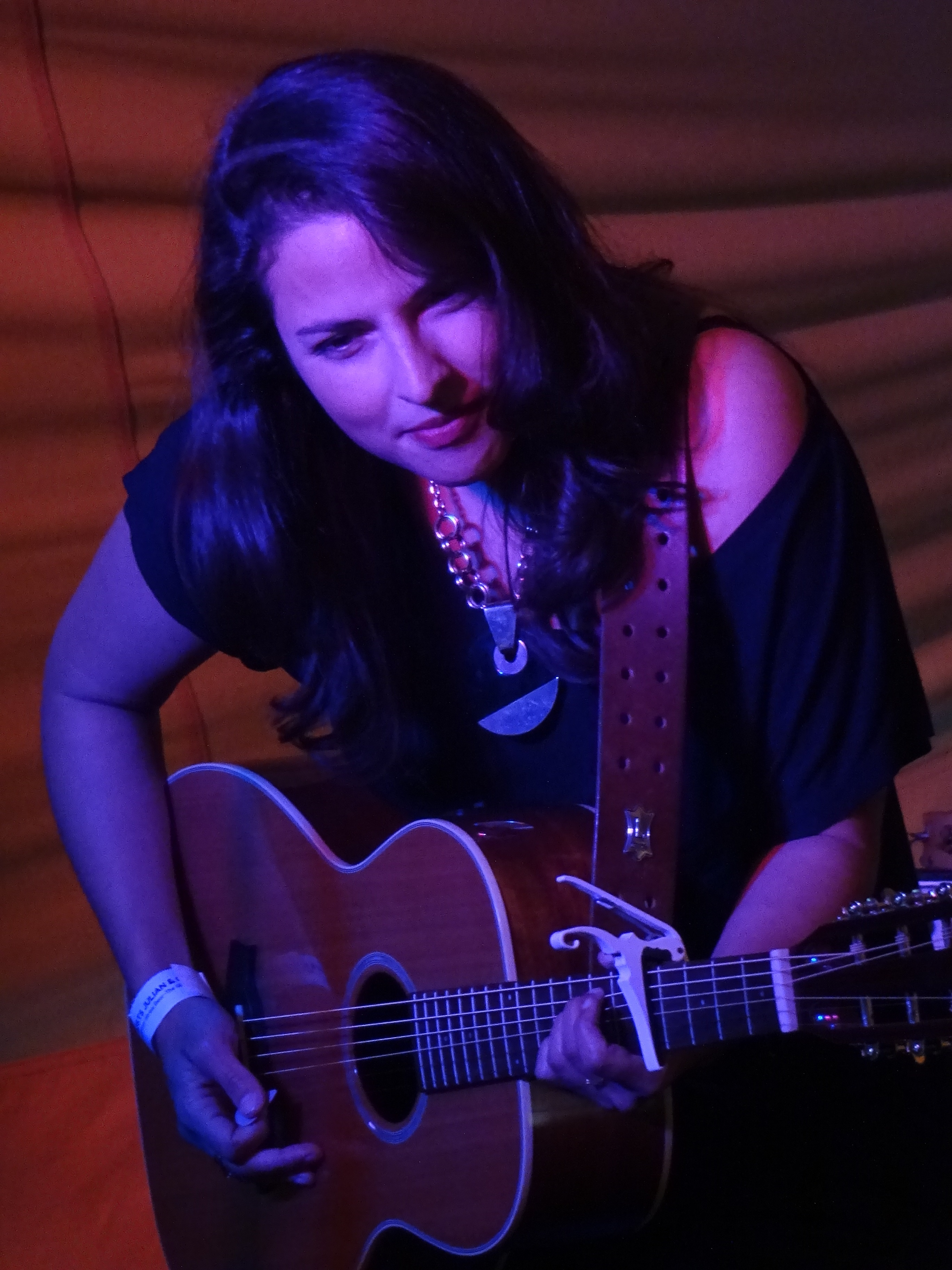

Background information
- Origin: Bedford, England
- Genres: Americana, roots music, country blues, country soul
- Occupation: Singer-songwriter
- Instruments: Vocals, guitar
- Website: danninicholls.com

Danni Nicholls (born 28 August 1985) is a British multi award nominated Americana singer-songwriter. Her song, "First Cuckoo of Spring", was featured in the TV series Sons of Anarchy (season 7, 2014). Nicholls has also toured and opened for artists such as Shakin' Stevens, Lucinda Williams and The Secret Sisters.

== Early years ==
Growing up in Bedfordshire, England on the American roots music of her Anglo-Indian grandmother's record collection, at 16, Nicholls inherited, a 1963 Burns London shortscale electric jazz guitar from her uncle Heathcliff. The guitar is rumoured to have once belonged to English rock and roll artist Billy Fury. She has a BA in drama from Kingston University (2004–2007). She studied songwriting and the music business in Brighton, England, while promoting her own music nights in several venues.

== Career ==
=== 2009–2012 ===
Nicholls toured throughout the UK during this period to promote her two released EPs, Heavy Shoes (2009) and Time (2012).

=== 2012–2014 ===
Nicholls recorded her first studio album, A Little Redemption, in Nashville, Tennessee, at the Yackland Studios East Nashville, produced by Chris Donohue. The team included engineer and mixer Stephen Leiweke and musicians Will Kimbrough, Al Perkins, Billy Livsey, Jordan Hamlin, Brigitte DeMeyer and Butterfly Boucher amongst others. The album was released on 1 July 2013. "First Cuckoo of Spring" from the album was featured in the TV series Sons of Anarchy (season 7, 2014).

=== 2015–2016 ===
Nicholls also recorded her second studio album Mockingbird Lane in Nashville, produced by Chris Donohue, engineered and mixed by Stephen Leiweke, and mastered by Alex McCullough. Musicians included Will Kimbrough, Ralph T Lofton, Brandy Zdan, Chris Donohue and Stephen Leiweke amongst others. The album was released on 23 October 2015.

=== 2017 ===
Mockingbird Lane was nominated at The Americana Music Association UK 2017 Awards for 'UK Album of the Year' and she performed her song "Beautifully Broken" at the St John's Church in Hackney, London. Later that year, Nicholls performed an official showcase at The Americana Music Association AmericanaFest 2017 in Nashville. In addition to her own headline tours in the UK, Nicholls performed at festivals in the UK and Denmark, notably several sets including the Women's Circle (also featuring Kaia Kater from Canada, Tami Neilson from New Zealand along with Laura Mo and Dorthe Gerlach both from Denmark) at the Tonder Festival in Denmark. Nicholls also opened as support for Lucinda Williams at the De La Warr Pavilion, Bexhill-on-Sea, for one of only two shows in the UK and completed 28 dates on a full UK with Shakin' Stevens on his 'Echoes of our Time' tour at venues such as O2 Shepherd's Bush, the Blackpool Opera House and the Glasgow Royal Concert Hall. She released a live album, The Vintage TV Recordings, with a launch show in April at the St Pancras Old Church in London. The album is made up of songs recorded and aired by Vintage TV UK from three sessions: Live Sessions from Dingwalls, Camden, London that featured Nicholls with a full band, Live At The Water Rats, London supporting Toyah Willcox as a duo with guitarist Max Milligan and Live With from the Metropolis Studios. In April 2017, Nicholls was featured as 'Artist of the Month' by Caffe Nero.

=== 2018 ===
In 2018, Nicholls was nominated for 'UK Artist of the Year' at The Americana Music Association UK 2018 Awards and was nominated for 'Best Country/Folk Act' for the 2018 Unsigned Music Awards. Nicholls performed an official showcase at the Folk Alliance International conference in Kansas City. followed by a support tour for The Secret Sisters in the UK and Ireland and festival appearances at the Black Deer Festival and Long Road Festival. During the summer, Nicholls returned to Nashville to record her new studio album The Melted Morning, planned for release in spring 2019, at the Moxe Studio with producer Jordan Brooke Hamlin and featuring artists The Secret Sisters and Kyshona Armstrong.

=== 2019 ===
The Melted Morning was released on 12 April 2019 worldwide. Nicholls toured the UK as a trio with musicians Tom Dibb and Mark Lewis. The song "Hear Your Voice" from The Melted Morning was nominated for UK Song of the Year by the Americana Music Association UK. Nicholls showcased at AmericanaFest, Nashville.

=== 2020 ===
Nicholls opened the 2020 Americana Music Association UK Awards show at Troxy, London, with 'Song of the Year' nominated "Hear Your Voice".

== Discography ==
Year	Title	Format
2009	Heavy Shoes	EP
2012	Time	EP
2013	A Little Redemption	CD
2015	Mockingbird Lane	CD
2017	The Vintage TV Recordings	CD
2019	The Melted Morning	CD
2022	"Little Fictions"	Single
2022	"The River"	Single

=== Videos ===
Year	Title	Format
2013	"Hey There, Sunshine"	Single
2017	"Beautifully Broken"	Single
2019	"Lemonade"	Single

== Nominations ==
Year	Organisation	Award
2017	Americana Music Association UK	'UK Album of the Year'
2018	Americana Music Association UK	'UK Artist of the Year'
2018	Unsigned Music Awards	'Best Country/Folk Act'
2020	Americana Music Association UK	'UK Song of the Year'
