= Jim Nickalls =

English footballer

Personal information
- Full name: James Horatio Nickalls
- Date of birth: 29 May 1934
- Place of birth: Amble, England
- Date of death: June 2016 (aged 82)
- Place of death: Northumberland, England
- Position: Centre half

Youth career
- 19??–1953: Amble B.C.

Senior career*
Years	Team	Apps	(Gls)
1953–1954	Sunderland	0	(0)
1954–1955	Darlington	18	(0)
- * Club domestic league appearances and goals

James Horatio Nickalls (29 May 1934 – June 2016) was an English footballer who played as a centre half in the Football League for Darlington. He was on Sunderland's books without representing them in the League.
