= James Nicholls (rugby league) =

English rugby league footballer

Playing information
Club
Years	Team	Pld	T	G	FG	P
1941–49	Castleford	117	10	0	0	30

James Nicholls was a professional rugby league footballer who played in the 1940s. He played at club level for Castleford. He was born on 1 December 1915 in Lancashire, and died on 16 January 1982 in Pontefract General Infirmary.
