= Ron Nicholls =

Ron Nicholls can refer to:

- Ron Nicholls (cricketer, born 1933) (1933–1994), English cricketer and footballer
- Ron Nicholls (cricketer, born 1951), Australian cricketer
