= Stephen Nicholls =

Australian cardiologist (born 1971)

Stephen Nicholls FRACP FAHMS FACC FESC FAHA
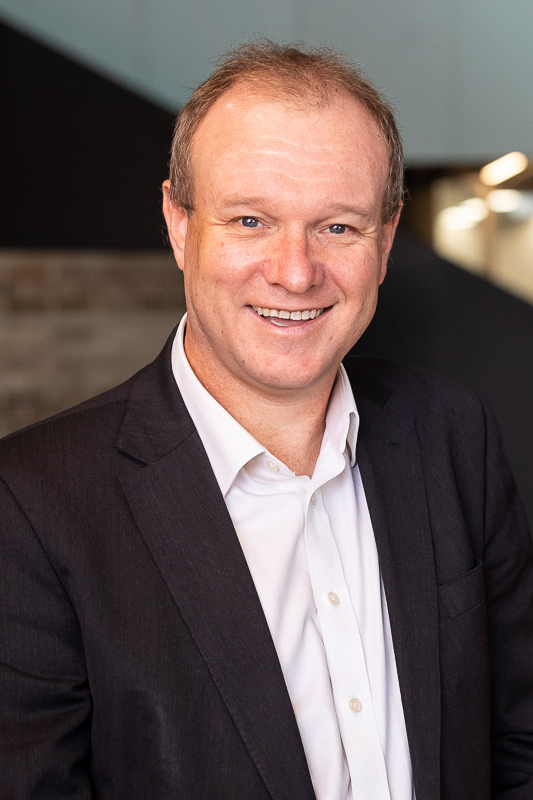
- Born: Stephen James Nicholls; 29 May 1971 (age 55); Gawler, South Australia, Australia
- Education: University of Adelaide
- Scientific career
- Fields: Cardiology; Medicine
- Workplaces: University of Adelaide; Cleveland Clinic; SAHMRI; Monash University
- Thesis: The role of anti-inflammatory properties of high density lipoproteins in atheroprotection (2004)

Stephen J. Nicholls (born 29 May 1971) is an Australian cardiologist. He was appointed to the position of director of MonashHeart, Monash Health and professor of cardiology, Monash University in October 2018. He is the inaugural clinical director of the Victorian Heart Hospital. He is also the inaugural director of Monash University’s Victorian Heart Institute, an organisation dedicated to creating the cardiovascular health solutions of the future.

== Education ==
Nicholls completed his cardiology training at John Hunter Hospital, undertook his doctoral studies at the University of Adelaide focussing on the anti-inflammatory properties of HDL and had a faculty appointment at the Cleveland Clinic before returning to Australia in 2012.

== Career ==
Prior his appointment at MonashHeart, he was the deputy director and inaugural heart health theme leader at the South Australian Health and Medical Research Institute (SAHMRI). He also held positions as professor of cardiology at the University of Adelaide and worked as a cardiologist at the Central Adelaide Local Health Network (SA Health).

Nicholls is a preventive cardiologist. His clinical interest is focused on identifying those at risk of heart disease earlier, and more effectively, and preventing catastrophic cardiovascular events from occurring. Noting that heart disease is no longer a disease of affluence, he is committed to solutions which improve equity across risk and management, focusing on women’s heart health and other under-served populations.

Nicholls' work spans the translational spectrum from the lab bench to the bedside, with a focus on understanding the factors that promote plaque formation, novel vascular imaging and leadership of large-scale clinical trials of new therapies designed to reduce the risk of heart disease.

He is a Principal Research Fellow of the National Health and Medical Research Council, an inaugural Fellow of the Australian Academy of Health and Medical Sciences. He is the Honorary Secretary of the Cardiac Society of Australia and New Zealand, President of the Australian Atherosclerosis Society and serves as a board member of the International Atherosclerosis Society and Australian Cardiovascular Alliance. In August 2021 he was announced as the next president of The Cardiac Society of Australia and New Zealand, Australia's peak body for cardiologists, commencing in mid-2022 and running for 24 months.

Nicholls has extensive academic and industry collaborations, having raised more than $100 million in research funding and has written more than 800 manuscripts, book chapters and conference proceedings.

== Recognition ==
- 2011 - Cleveland Clinic Innovator Award
- 2015 - Fellowship, Australian Academy of Health and Medical Sciences
- 2016 - NHMRC Research Excellence Award (Top Ranked Research Fellow)
- 2018 - RT Hall Prize, Cardiac Society of Australia and New Zealand
- 2022 - Eric Susman Prize (co-awarded), Royal Australasian College of Physicians
