= Laura Nicholls =

Laura Nicholls may refer to:

- Laura Nicholls (swimmer) (born 1978), Canadian Olympic freestyle swimmer
- Laura Nicholls (basketball) (born 1989), Spanish Olympic basketball player
