= Emmanuel Presbyterian Church (Rochester, New York) =

Historic church in New York, United States

- U.S. National Register of Historic Places
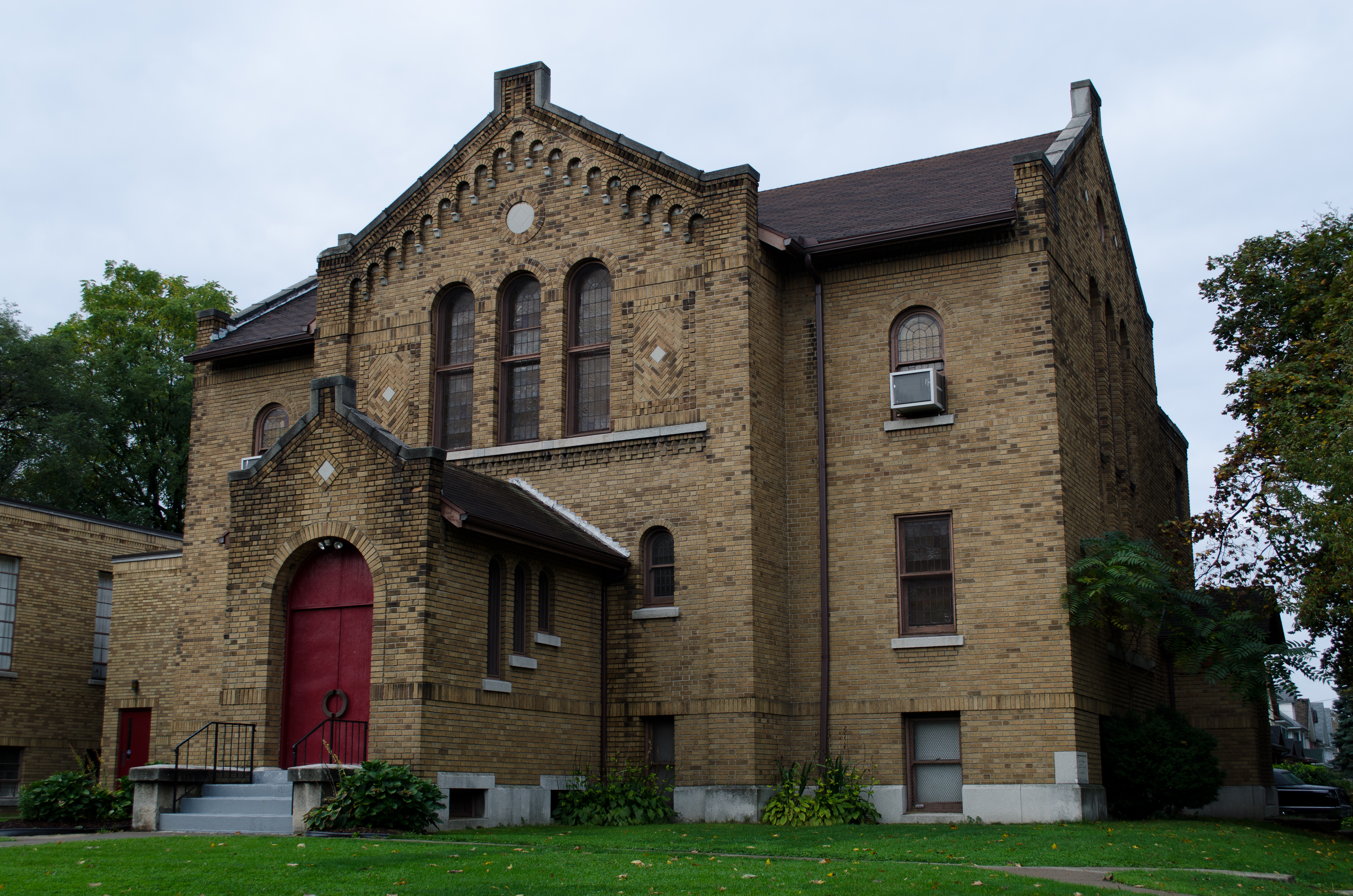
- Emmanuel Presbyterian Church, October 2012

- Location within New York Location within the United States
- Location: Jefferson Ave. at 9 Shelter St., Rochester, New York
- Coordinates: 43°8′19″N 77°37′47″W
- Area: less than one acre
- Built: 1915
- Architect: Heech, O.J.
- Architectural style: Late 19th And Early 20th Century American Movements
- NRHP reference No.: 01000295
- Added to NRHP: March 29, 2001

Emmanuel Presbyterian Church, also known as Trinity Emmanuel Presbyterian Church, is a historic Presbyterian church located at Rochester in Monroe County, New York. It is an Arts and Crafts / American Craftsman style building constructed in 1914–1915. The main, original two story block of the building is cruciform in plan with slightly longer arms at the north and south ends.

It was listed on the National Register of Historic Places in 2001.

== Gallery ==
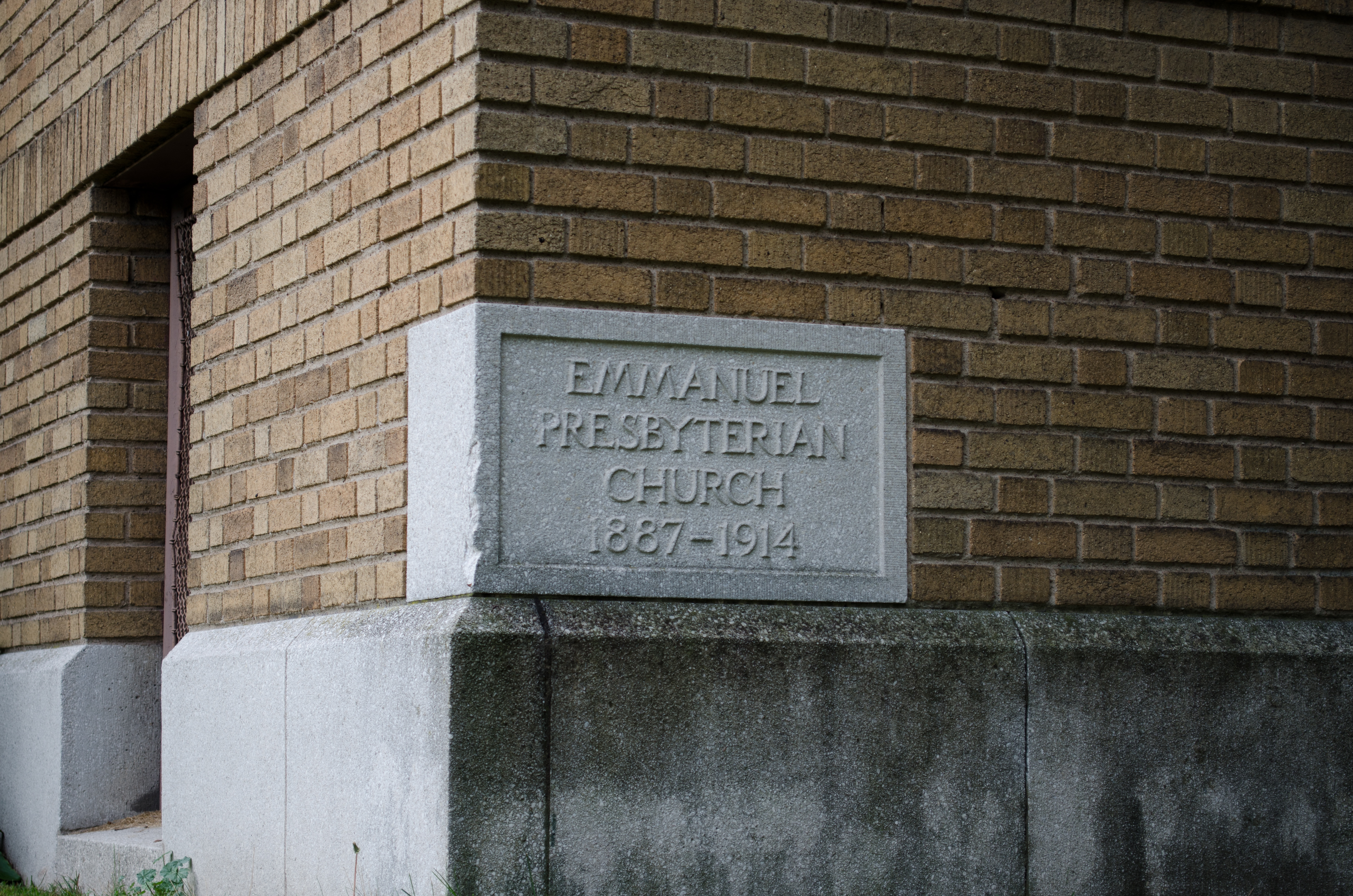
Church cornerstone
