= Matthew Nicholls (classicist) =

British researcher (born 1978)

Matthew C. Nicholls (born 1978) is visiting professor of classics at the University of Reading and senior tutor at St John's College, University of Oxford. He is a specialist in libraries in the Roman empire and the history of the city of Rome. He has also created a large scale digital reconstruction of the ancient city of Rome, which is the basis of a popular Massive Open Online Course or MOOC.

== Selected publications ==
- "Bibliotheca Latina Graecaque: on the possible division of Roman libraries by language". Latomus: SIEN Neronia VIII (2011), 327 . pp. 11–21. ISSN 0023-8856
- "Galen and libraries in the Peri Alupias", Journal of Roman Studies, Vol. 101 (2011), pp. 123–142. ISSN 1753-528X doi: https://doi.org/10.1017/S0075435811000049
- "Public libraries in the cities of the Roman Empire" in G. Woolf et al. (eds.) (2013) Ancient Libraries. Cambridge University Press. ISBN 9781107012561
- "Libraries and literature in Rome" in A. Claridge & C. Holleran (eds.) (2013) Companion to the City of Rome. Wiley-Blackwell. ISBN 9781405198196
- "A library at Antium?" in C. K. Rothschild & T. W. Thompson (eds.) (2014) Galen's De Indolentia: essays on a newly discovered letter. Studien und Texte zu Antike und Christentum (88). Mohr Siebeck, Tübingen, pp. 65–78. ISBN 9783161532153
- "Le biblioteche come centri di cultura nel mondo Romano" in R. Meneghini & R. Rossella (eds.) (2014) La biblioteca Infinita: i luoghi di sapere nel mondo antico. Electa, Milan, pp. 82–97. ISBN 9788837098551
- "Libraries and networks of influence in the Roman world", Segno e Testo, 13 (2015), pp. 125–146. ISSN 2037-0245
- "Libraries and communication in the Ancient World" in F. S. Naiden & R. J. A. Talbert (eds.) (2017) Mercury's Wings: exploring modes of communication in the ancient world. Oxford University Press, New York. ISBN 9780195386844
- "Sketchup and digital modelling for Classics" in B. Natoli & S. Hunt (eds.) (2019) Teaching Classics with Technology. Bloomsbury, London, pp. 131–144. ISBN 9781350110939
- "'Bookish places' in Imperial Rome: bookshops and the urban landscape of learning" in S. A. Adams (ed.) (2019) Scholastic Culture in the Hellenistic and Roman Eras: Greek, Latin, and Jewish. De Gruyter, pp. 51–68.
