= Joe Nicholls (footballer, fl. 1914–1925) =

English footballer

Personal information
- Full name: Joseph Edward Nicholls
- Place of birth: Bilston, England
- Position: Full back

Senior career*
| Years | Team | Apps | (Gls) |
| 1914–1915 | Wolverhampton Wanderers | 0 | (0) |
| 1918–1919 | Bilston United | | |
| 1919–1925 | Clapton Orient | 117 | (2) |
| 1925 | Bilston United | | |
| Total | | 117 | (2) |
- * Club domestic league appearances and goals

Joseph Edward Nicholls was an English footballer who played in the Football League for Clapton Orient.
