= Rhoda Holmes Nicholls =

American painter (1854–1930)

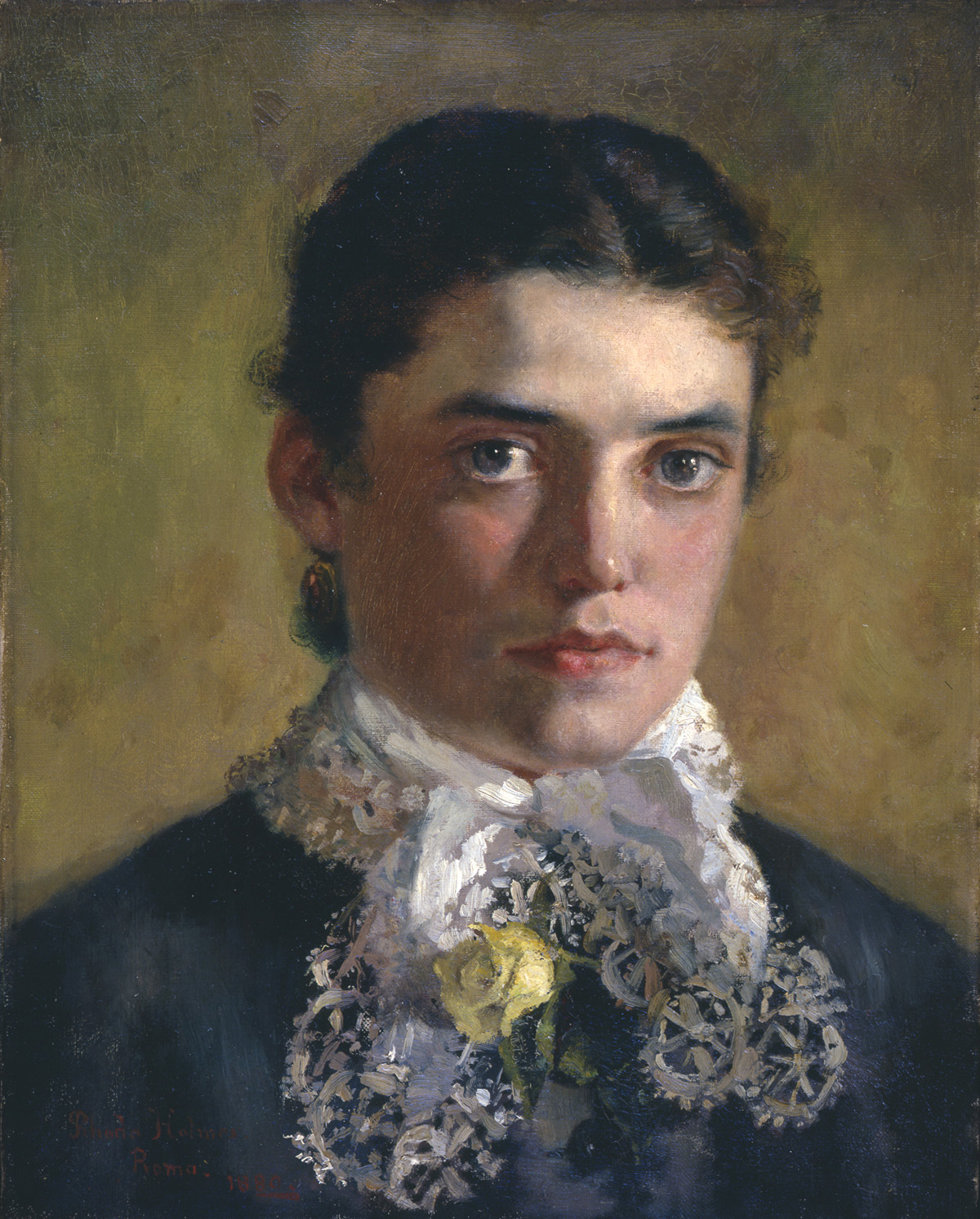
- Self-portrait
- Born: Rhoda Carlton Marian Holmes; March 28, 1854; Coventry, England
- Died: September 7, 1930 (aged 76); Stamford, Connecticut
- Education: Bloomsbury School of Art, London
- Known for: Painting
- Spouse: Burr H. Nicholls

Rhoda Holmes Nicholls (March 28, 1854 – September 7, 1930) was an English-American watercolor and oil painter, born in Coventry, England. She studied art in England and Italy, and her work was viewed and praised at the time by the queens of both countries. A body of work was created in South Africa by Nicholls of Port Elizabeth area's scenery, wildlife and architecture. She lived there on her brothers' 25,000-acre ostrich farm for one year.

Her watercolor paintings and illustrations were published in journals, and her oil paintings won awards in the United States and Europe. Nicholls was a successful artist, writer and art instructor. She was actively involved in many art organizations as a member and leader.

== Early life ==
Rhoda Carleton Marian Holmes, the daughter of Rev. William Grome Holmes and Marion Cooke Holmes, (Note: Her father's name was also stated as Rev. George Holmes.) was born in Coventry, England. Her father, an Oxford University graduate, was vicar of the parish Littlehampton, Sussex. When she was ten years old her family moved to Hertfordshire.

She was educated by governesses and at a boarding school. During her childhood she had musical and artistic training. She "inherited intellectuality and a cultured taste" from her parents and graduated from school with honor.

== Education ==
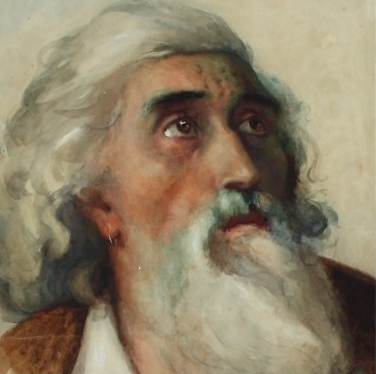
Roma (study of a peasant man), c. 1880, watercolor

Holmes studied art at the Bloomsbury School of Art, now the Royal College of Art, one of the Kensington Museum's schools in London. She won the Queen's prize at the end of her first year, which granted her £60 (Note: Her biographical sketch in A Woman of the Century stated that the prize for three years was £40 each year.) annually for three years and an additional £10 directly from Queen Victoria's personal budget "in token of high approval" of her work. After studying in London for a year, she decided to continue her studies in Italy, thereby forfeiting the prize. Holmes studied the human figure with Giuseppe Cammarano and landscape painting with Achille Vertunni in Venice or in Rome. In the winter of 1881 she met with and showed her work to Queen Margherita of Italy who praised her talent and achievement. Holmes joined Circolo Artistico, a club of multi-national professional artists, where she took evening classes. She was the second woman elected to the Società degli Aquarellisti (Society of Watercolorists).

Her studies later continued with William Merritt Chase at the Shinnecock Hills Summer School of Art.

== South Africa ==
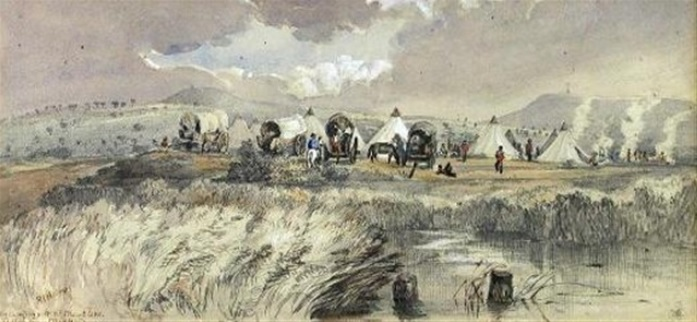
Encampment near Mount Coke, Kaffraria, Cape of Good Hope, South Africa, watercolor

She and her mother spent one year near Port Elizabeth in South Africa on the 25,000-acre ostrich farm owned by her two brothers. "Enchanted" with the Karoo desert and mountainous scenery, fauna, wildlife, and architecture, Holmes made many paintings during her stay. She also hunted and rode horseback with her brothers.

== Marriage ==
Rhoda Holmes met American artist Burr H. Nicholls during a subsequent trip to Venice. They got married in 1884 at Lyminster Church in Sussex, England, honeymooned in Venice and sailed for the United States in the spring of 1884.

Burr Nicholls, born in 1848, and his wife exhibited their works in some of the same shows, such as the Chicago Interstate Industrial Expositions.

In 1893, the couple lived in a "cosey" home and both had studios on the top floor. By 1896, Nicholls and her husband were living in a West 50th Street mansion in New York City. They had a daughter, Rhoda Olive, and a son, Arundel Holmes Nicholls, who became favored subjects for her works.

The couple's marriage became contentious when one of Holmes Nicholls works was accepted by the Paris Salon for exhibition, but her husband's work was rejected. The couple divorced and "newspapers widely warned women about the dangers of success and its potential influence on marital and domestic bliss." Burr Nicholls died in 1915.

== Career ==
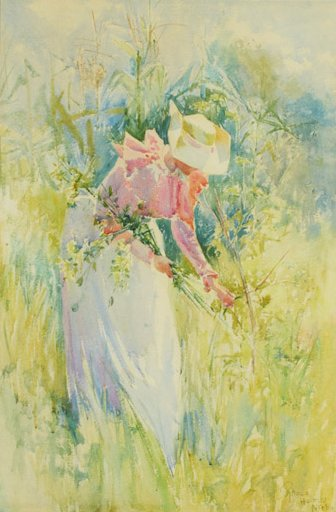
Picking Wildflowers, c. 1900, High Museum of Art

She returned to England following four years in Italy and South Africa, and her work was shown and positively received at Royal Academy of Arts exhibitions. After moving to the United States with her husband, Nicholls exhibited her works at the Society of American Artists. She exhibited her work at the Palace of Fine Arts and the Woman's Building at the 1893 World's Columbian Exposition in Chicago, Illinois. She received awards in Europe and the United States, including the Chicago World's Fair, a silver medal in Boston in 1885 for Venetian Sunlight, and a gold medal at the American Art Association of New York for Those Evening Bells. Aside from the Chicago World's Fair, Nicholls won medals at many expositions between 1893 and 1904. She preferred working in oils and won the highest honors for her oil paintings. After living in the city for eight years, she was described as "one of New York's best known artists".

Her work is described in The Symposium: A Monthly Literary Magazine:

The first characteristic of this artist's work are strength, accurate knowledge, sure intention, and vigor of expression. What she has to express she sets forth unhesitatingly with clearness and vim. There is always great charm in her color; it is pure, vibrating, strong, and yet refined.

— Susan M. Ketcham

Nicholls created illustrations for Howells' Venetian Life in which she captured the "'serene, sunny moods of the sea city,' with its transparent atmosphere and the still heat of its unflinching sun, and the most vivid contrasts are made with a skill that blends without obliterating." Her works were reproduced in Art Amateur and Art Interchange. Although she won more awards for her oil paintings, she is best known for her watercolors that were published in these and other publications. Other mediums Nicholls employed were pastels, crayons, and wash drawings.

Examples of her paintings of figures are Those Evening Bells, Searching the Scriptures, and The Scarlet Letter. She made paintings of still life, such as A Rose and Cherries.

Nicholls invented tools and techniques for watercolor paintings, was an innovator in the use of color in her painting of shadows, and was considered "one of the foremost painters of Venetian subjects" in the United States.

Her paintings were shown at the MacDowell Club, which was established by women to exhibit and promote their works. She was a member of the Woman's Art Club of New York. Nicholls was made vice-president of the New York Water Color Club and belonged to the American Society of Miniature Painters and the American Water Color Society. Nicholls served as co-editor of Palette and Bench.

Nicholls taught art from her 7th Avenue studio in New York, at the Art Students League of New York, William Merritt Chase's Shinnecock School of Art on Long Island, and in towns in the eastern United States. One of her students was Adele Williams of Richmond, Virginia.

== Death ==
Nichols died on September 7, 1930, in Stamford, Connecticut, as the result of the osteoarthritis that had made her an invalid for the last 10 years of her life.

In 2006, the Williams College Museum of Art held an exhibition of 25 of her watercolors and oil paintings—including landscapes, seascapes, and still lifes—from the collection of Walter and Berta Burr of Hoosick, New York.

== Collections ==
- Boston Art Club, Massachusetts
- High Museum of Art, Atlanta, Georgia
- Museum of Fine Arts, Boston, Massachusetts
- Smithsonian American Art Museum, Washington, District of Columbia
- Strong Museum, Rochester, New York
