= Henry Nicholls =

Henry or Harry Nicholls may refer to:

- Henry Richard Nicholls (1830–1912), Australian journalist and newspaper editor
  - H. R. Nicholls Society, a right-wing Australian think tank on industrial relations
- Henry Nicholls, explorer and member of the African Association
- Henry Nicholls (cricketer) (born 1991), New Zealand cricketer
- Henry Nicholls (politician) (1893–1962), British politician, MP for Stratford West Ham, 1945–1950
- Henry George Nicholls (1825–1867), English Anglican priest and writer
- Henry George Nicholls (pastor) (c. 1852–1936), Congregational minister in England and South Australia and Presbyterian minister in Victoria, Australia
- Sir Henry Alfred Alford Nicholls (1851–1926), physician, horticulturist, legislator in, and publicist for Dominica
- Harry Nicholls (VC) (1915–1975), English recipient of the VC
- Harry Nicholls (comedian) (Henry Thomas Nicholls, 1852–1926), English actor, comedian, songwriter and playwright
- Ginger Nicholls (Harry Edgar Nicholls, 1900–1978), New Zealand international rugby union player

== See also ==
- Henry Nichols (disambiguation)
