= Reg Nicholls =

Reg Nicholls may refer to:

- Reg Nicholls (footballer) ( 1922–1990), Australian rules footballer
- Reg Nicholls (athlete), English athlete
