= A. W. Steele =

American cartoonist (1862–1925)

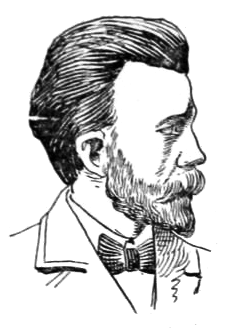

Albert Wilbur Steele (June 18, 1862 – March 12, 1925) was an American political cartoonist associated with the Denver Post and Rocky Mountain News. Steele was born in Malden, Illinois, the sixth child of Henry Danforth and Louisa (Peabody) Steele. His family came to Colorado when he was four, and he grew up in Denver. He was cartoonist with the Rocky Mountain News from 1890 to 1897, and joined the Post in 1897. His cartoons were reproduced frequently in national magazines such as Review of Reviews and Cosmopolitan, as well as New York and Chicago newspapers. He married Anna Crary, a children's writer, on March 27, 1884.
