= Arthur Nicholls =

Arthur Nicholls may refer to:

- Arthur Bell Nicholls (1819–1906), curate to Patrick Brontë, and husband of Patrick's daughter Charlotte Brontë
- Arthur Nicholls (British Army officer) (1911–1944), British recipients of the George Cross
- Arthur G. Nicholls (1879–1956), Australian medical missionary
