= Paul Nicholson =

Paul Nicholson may refer to:

- Paul Nicholson (ice hockey) (1954–2011), Canadian ice hockey forward
- Paul Nicholson (darts player) (born 1979), English-born Australian darts player
- Paul Nicholson (businessman) (1938–2025), English industrialist and Lord Lieutenant of County Durham
- Paul Nicholson (footballer) (born 1986), professional footballer
- Paul Nicholson, graphic designer known for creating the Aphex Twin logo
