= Anthony Nicholls =

Anthony Nicholls may refer to:

- Anthony Nicholls (actor) (1902–1977), English film, television, and stage actor
- Anthony Nicholls (physicist), CEO and president of OpenEye Scientific Software

== See also ==
- Anthony Nicholl or Nichols, English politician
- Tony Nichols, bishop
