= Lars Gustaf Sellstedt =

American painter (1819–1911)

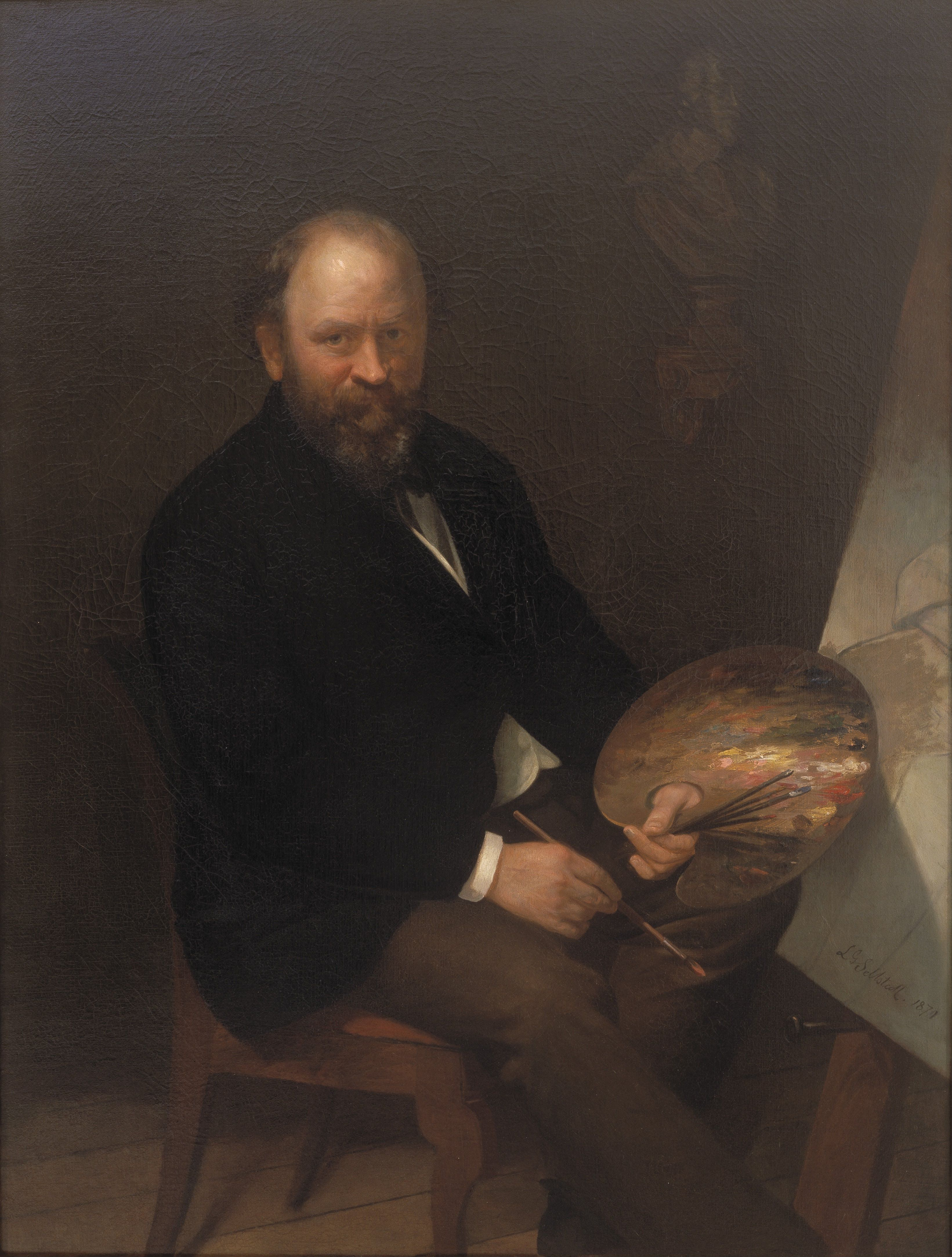
- Self Portrait, 1871
- Born: April 30, 1819; Sundsvall, Västernorrland, Sweden
- Died: June 4, 1911; Buffalo, New York

Lars Gustaf Sellstedt (April 30, 1819 – June 4 1911) was a Swedish-American painter known for his portraits and landscapes and for his role in establishing and developing the Buffalo Fine Arts Academy in Buffalo, New York.

== Early years ==
Lars Gustaf Sellstedt was the son of Eric Sellstedt and Eva Thorén and was born and raised in Sundsvall, Sweden, the administrative center of Västernorrland and an important port city on the Baltic Sea located 375 km (230 miles) north of Stockholm. When he was eleven, his father died (30 August 1828) and a year later his mother remarried. Sellstedt was taken out of school by his stepfather prompting him to go off to sea as a cabin boy in 1831.

From 1831 to 1842 Sellstedt was a sailor in the Baltic and Mediterranean Seas, the Atlantic Ocean, and the Great Lakes. During the years 1837–1840 he sailed along the Atlantic and Pacific coasts of South America aboard the sloop USS Falmouth, an American warship. In his spare time aboard ship, he began to develop his artistic skills working in scrimshaw, tattoo art, and watercolor painting.

In 1842 Sellstedt traveled to Buffalo, New York, to join friends from the Falmouth who had moved there and became a resident of this port city. In 1847 he began classes in the newly formed School of Medicine of the University of Buffalo. In January 1850, he married Louise Lovejoy. She died in October 1850 from cholera.

In 1853 Sellstedt left Buffalo to travel back to Sundsvall. He was able to reunite with his mother and sister and remained in Sundsvall through the winter earning money by painting portraits and teaching English. He returned to the United States the next summer.

== Career in Buffalo ==
After returning to Buffalo, Sellstedt continued painting and developed a reputation as a portrait artist. In 1856 he married Caroline Scott, a daughter of the notable Buffalo physician William K. Scott.

Two U.S. Presidents, Millard Fillmore and Grover Cleveland sat for a portrait by Sellstedt. He also painted portraits of James O. Putnam, William Fargo, E.G. Spaulding, William Letchworth, and Sherman S. Rogers.

In 1862, Sellstedt and Amos W. Sangster along with former President Millard Fillmore were among the twenty-six who founded the Buffalo Fine Arts Academy. Sellstedt served as the Academy's superintendent for 28 years and served as president for two years (1876–77). In 1911, he was named honorary president of the Academy.

In 1874, Sellstedt was elected as a National Academician by the National Design Academy.

Lars Gustaf Sellstedt died at the age of ninety-two on June 4, 1911, in Buffalo, New York. His wife Caroline (Scott) Sellstedt had predeceased him in 1909.

== Exhibitions ==
- 1882 Mrs. Sellstedt, portrait at the National Academy of Design
- 1901 Mrs. Sellstedt, Self-Portrait, and Millard Fillmore portraits at the Exposition Art Gallery of the Pan American Exposition.
- 1962 100: Buffalo Fine Arts Academy Centennial Exhibition at the Albright-Knox Art Gallery included 50 paintings by Sellstedt
- 1972 The Lars Sellstedt Heritage Exhibition at Burchfield Penney Art Center at Buffalo State University

== Publications ==
- Lars Gustaf Sellstedt (1904). From Forecastle to Academy: Sailor and Artist. Buffalo, NY: Matthews-Northrup Works.
- Lars Gustaf Sellstedt (1910). Art In Buffalo. Buffalo, NY: Matthews-Northrup Works.
