= Emmanuel Presbyterian Church (Colorado Springs, Colorado) =

Historic church in Colorado, United States

- U.S. National Register of Historic Places
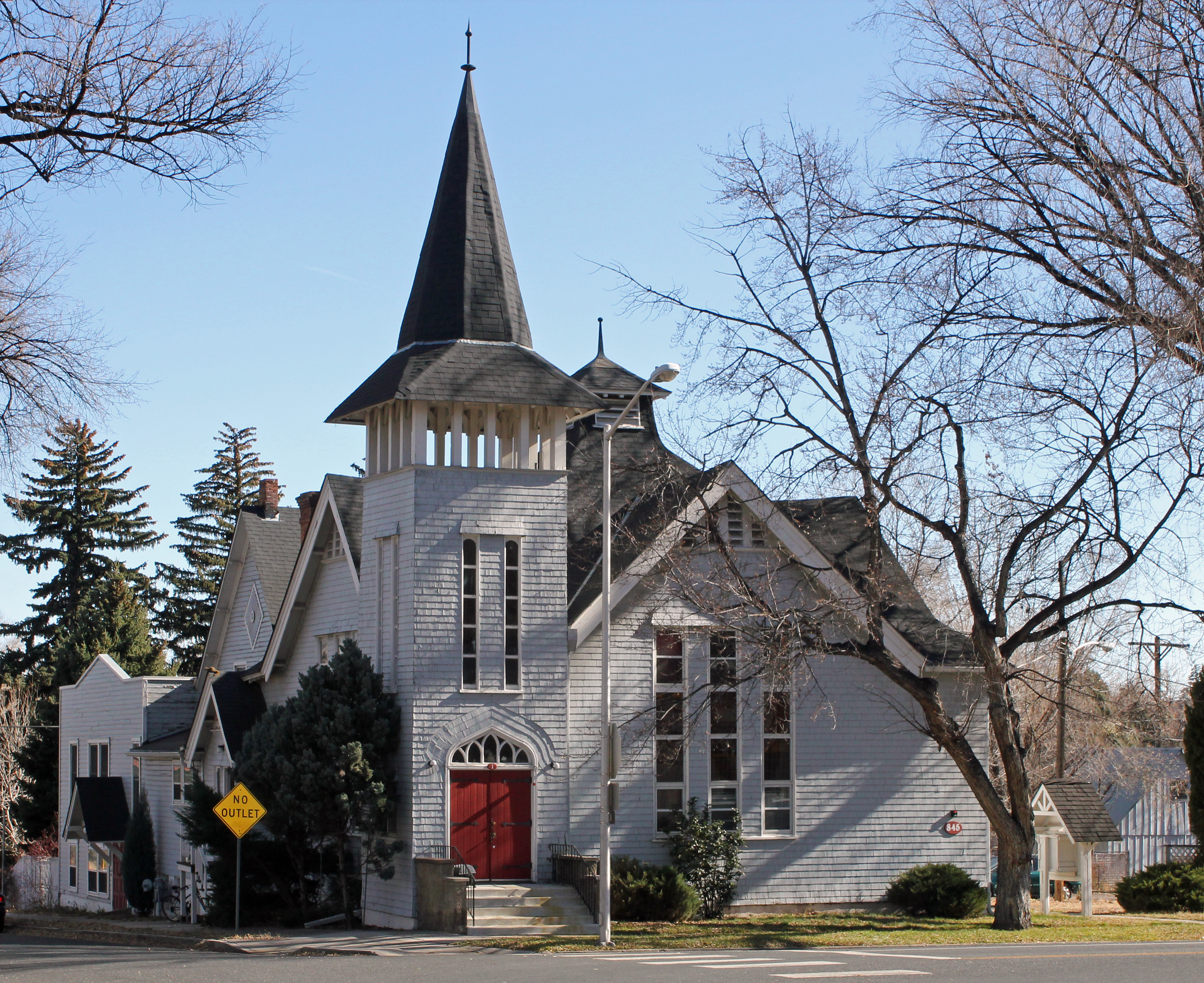

- Location within Colorado Location within the United States
- Location: 419 Mesa Rd., Colorado Springs, Colorado
- Coordinates: 38°50′45″N 104°49′54″W
- Area: 1.6 acres (0.65 ha)
- Built: 1903
- NRHP reference No.: 84000830
- Added to NRHP: May 17, 1984

Emmanuel Presbyterian Church (Unity Church of the Nazarene) is a historic church at 419 Mesa Road in Colorado Springs, Colorado. It was built in 1903 and was added to the National Register in 1984. The Emmanuel Presbyterian Church is significant as one of the few remaining examples of vernacular ecclesiastical architecture of landmark proportions in Colorado Springs.
