= Nicolson =

Nicolson is a patronymic surname meaning "son of Nicholas". There are alternate spellings. Notable people with the surname include:

- Adam Nicolson (born 1957), English author
- Alexander Nicolson (1827–1893), Scottish lawyer
- Arthur Nicolson, 1st Baron Carnock (1849–1928), British diplomat and politician
- Benedict Nicolson (1914–1978), British art historian and author
- Charles Hope Nicolson (1829–1898), Scottish settler, lawman and police magistrate in the colony of Victoria
- Dan Henry Nicolson (1933–2016), American botanist
- David Nicolson (1922–1996), British business executive and politician
- David Nicolson, 4th Baron Carnock (1920–2008), British peer and solicitor
- Don Nicolson (born 1939), Australian rules footballer
- Donald Nicolson (died between 1698 and 1702), Scottish clergyman
- Edward Nicolson (born 1964), English cricketer
- Garth L. Nicolson (born 1943), American biochemist
- Gerda Nicolson (1937–1992), Australian actress
- Harold Nicolson (1886–1968), British diplomat, politician and writer
- Harry Nicolson (born 2001), Scottish footballer
- Helen Nicolson (1924–2021), Scottish child psychiatrist
- Hugo Nicolson, English record producer and engineer
- Iain Nicolson (born 1976), Scottish footballer
- Ian Nicolson (born 1986), Zimbabwean cricketer
- James Nicolson (disambiguation), multiple people
- Jamie Nicolson (1971–1994), Australian boxer
- John Nicolson (disambiguation), multiple people
- Joseph Nicolson (1706–1777), English antiquarian
- Juliet Nicolson (born 1954), British author and journalist
- Ken Nicolson (1902–1975), Australian rules footballer
- Lewis Nicolson (born 2004), Scottish footballer
- Lorne Nicolson (1936–2021), Canadian educator and political figure
- Marianne Nicolson (born 1969), Canadian First Nations visual artist
- Marjorie Hope Nicolson (1894–1981), American literary scholar
- Mark Nicolson, American tenor and voice teacher
- Max Nicolson (1917–1997), Australian rules footballer
- Nigel Nicolson (1917–2004), British publisher, writer and politician
- Phyllis Nicolson (1917–1968), British mathematician
- Skye Nicolson (born 1995), Australian professional boxer
- Thomas Nicolson (disambiguation), multiple people
- Tom Nicolson (1879–1951), British athlete
- Violet Nicolson (1865–1904), British poet
- William Nicolson (1655–1727), British bishop

== Fictional characters ==
- Georgia Nicolson

== See also ==
- Nicolson Institute, school on the Isle of Lewis
- Clan Nicolson, Scottish clan
- Clan MacNeacail, Scottish clan
