= Clan Nicolson =

Lowland Scottish clan

- MacNeacail
- Motto: Generositate (By generosity)

Profile
- Plant badge: Sprig of juniper

Chief
- Adam Nicolson, 5th Baron Carnock
- 5th Baron Carnock

Clan Nicolson is a Lowland Scottish clan. The clan claims descent from an Edinburgh lawyer who lived in the 16th century and from a distinguished line of Aberdeen merchants who preceded him. During the mid-1980s David Nicolson, 4th Baron Carnock was recognised by the Lord Lyon King of Arms as the chief of Clan Nicolson. Around the same time, a Nicolson who claimed descent from the Highland clan of "Nicolsons" historically centred on Skye, petitioned the Lord Lyon King of Arms to be recognised as chief of his own clan. The Lord Lyon King of Arms accepted this man's petition on the condition he took the surname MacNeacail. In consequence there are two Scottish clans with similar names—the lowland Clan Nicolson and the highland Clan MacNeacail.

== History ==
=== Origins of the name ===
The surname Nicolson means "son of Nicol". The personal name Nicol meaning "victory people". The surname is shared by two Scottish clans—the lowland Clan Nicolson and the unrelated Clan MacNeacail of Skye. This is because in late 17th century members of Clan MacNeacail began to Anglicise their Gaelic name to Nicolson.

=== Origins of the clan ===
According to the heraldry of the Clan Nicolson and the Clan MacNeacail the two clans are linked: The chiefs of both clans have a gold shield with birds of prey, with falcons for the Nicolsons and hawks for the MacNeacails. However, there is little genealogical evidence to support a link between the chiefs of the two clans. In Scottish Gaelic, Nic signifies daughter. The Norse raided all around the coast of Scotland as well as the north of England, and the name Nicolson can also be found throughout Tyneside and Yorkshire in England.

==== Scottish-Norwegian War ====
During the Scottish–Norwegian War, the last Norse king who invaded Scotland, Haakon IV of Norway, sent an advance party under Anders Nicolassen who was his foster brother and one of his chief barons, to plunder the Isle of Bute before joining the main Norse fleet off the coast of Largs. In the ensuing Battle of Largs, the Norsemen were defeated but there is a persistent tradition that Anders Nicolassen settled in Scotland after he had been sent as an envoy from Norway to conclude the Treaty of Perth. The treaty finally ceded Norwegian sovereignty of the isles over to the king of Scotland.

=== 16th and 17th centuries ===
The chiefly line of Clan Nicolson claims descent from James Nicolson, an Edinburgh lawyer who died around 1580. His ancestors had been burgesses of Aberdeen in the 15th century. He had two sons, John and James. James entered the Church and became Moderator of the General Assembly of the Church of Scotland in 1595. By 1606 he was appointed Bishop of Dunkeld, though died in 1607. James's older brother, John, acquired the lands of Lasswade from Sinclair of Dryden in 1592. In 1629, his son was created a Baronet in Nova Scotia as Nicolson of that Ilk and Lasswade. His titled was succeeded by his grandson who became a Commissioner of Parliament for Edinburgh in 1672.

=== 19th century ===
The direct male line however died out by 1826, and the titles were claimed by a descendant of the branch descending from Nicolson Bishop of Dunkeld.

The title Baron of Carnock passed to another cousin Major General Sir William Nicolson, who was an only son of George Nicolson of Tarviston. The general saw service in the Americas, India, Ireland and Mauritius. He died in 1820 to be succeeded by his son, Admiral Sir Frederick Nicolson. In 1879, the admiral's eldest son, Frederick, was killed fighting the Zulus, so the title was passed to the second son, Arthur, in 1899. In June 1916 Arthur was created Baron Carnock of Carnock.

In the 1980s, David Nicolson, 4th Baron Carnock petitioned the Lord Lyon King of Arms to be recognised as the chief of Clan Nicolson, in virtue of his ancestor—John Nicolson of that Ilk, 1st Baronet of Lasswade (d. 1651). At around the same time another Nicolson was in the process of putting forward a petition to become chief of the Highland Nicolsons. In 1985, after matriculating arms, David Nicolson, 4th Baron Carnock was recognised by the Lord Lyon King of Arms as chief of the name Nicolson. The position of chief of clan Nicolson is currently vacant, although Adam Nicolson, 5th Lord Carnock, could legitimately claim it.

== Heraldry ==
Baron Carnock

Nicholson of that Ilk

Nicholson of Clunie

Nicholson, Baron of Balvenie

Stewart-Nicholson of Carnock

Today members of Clan Nicolson may show allegiance to their clan and chief by wearing a Scottish crest badge. This badge contains the chief's heraldic crest and heraldic motto. The motto which appears on the crest badge is GENEROSITATE, which translates from Latin either as "by generosity" or "by inheritance", or a combination of the two. The crest itself is a lion issuant Or armed and langued Gules. The heraldic elements with the crest badge are derived from the Arms of Nicolson of that Ilk. These arms are blazoned Or three falcons' heads erased Gules armed Argent. Note that the arms of the chiefs of the clans Nicolson and MacNeacail are very similar. In fact, the arms of the MacNeacail chief are subordinate to those borne by the Nicolson chief.

== See also ==
- Baron Carnock
- Nicolson Baronets
- Clan MacNeacail, the Highland "Nicolsons" historically centred on the Isle of Skye.
