= McNicoll =

McNicoll is an anglicised version of the Scottish Gaelic surname, MacNeacail.

Notable people with the surname include:

- Alan McNicoll (1908–1987), Australian navy officer
- Carol McNicoll (born 1943), English pottery artist
- Cedric McNicoll (born 1988), Canadian ice hockey player
- Craig McNicoll (born 1971), English speed skater
- Daniel McNicoll, American film producer and director
- Elle McNicoll (born 1992), Scottish writer
- Frances McNicoll (died 1993), English-Australian writer, wife of Alan McNicoll
- Helen McNicoll (1879–1915), Canadian impressionist painter
- Iain McNicoll (born 1953), Scottish Royal Air Force officer
- Kinley McNicoll (born 1994), Canadian soccer player
- Ronald McNicoll (1906–1996), Australian army general
- Steven McNicoll (born 1970), Scottish actor
- Sylvia McNicoll (born 1954), Canadian author
- Walter McNicoll (1877–1947), Australian brigadier general, Administrator of Territory of New Guinea

== See also ==
- Mount McNicoll, British Columbia
- Port McNicoll, Ontario
- Nicoll
- McNicol
- McNicholl
