= Arthur Nicolson =

Arthur Nicolson may refer to:

- Arthur Nicolson, 1st Baron Carnock (1849–1928), diplomat
- the name of several Nicolson baronets

== See also ==
- Arthur D. Nicholson, military intelligence officer
