= Alexander Hamilton (of Ballincrieff) =

Alexander Hamilton of Innerwick and of Ballencrieff

Member of Parliament for Linlithgowshire
- In office 1727–1741
- Preceded by: George Dundas
- Succeeded by: George Dundas

Personal details
- Born: 1684
- Died: 28 December 1763 (aged 78–79)
- Spouse: Lady Margaret Kerr
- Relations: Sir Thomas Nicolson, 2nd Baronet (grandfather)
- Parent(s): James Hamilton; Margaret Nicolson Hamilton

Alexander Hamilton (1684 – 28 December 1763) of Innerwick and of Ballencrieff, Linlithgow was a Scottish politician who sat in the House of Commons from 1727 to 1741.

== Early life ==
Hamilton was the only son of James Hamilton of Ballencrieff and his wife Margaret (née Nicolson) Hamilton. After his father's death, his mother remarried to Sir Thomas Nicolson, 1st Baronet, with whom she had several daughters (his half-sisters), one of whom was Margaret Nicolson, the wife of William Kerr, 3rd Marquess of Lothian (Hamilton's brother-in-law).

His maternal grandparents were Sir Thomas Nicolson, 2nd Baronet and Lady Margaret Livingstone (daughter of Alexander Livingstone, 2nd Earl of Linlithgow), and his paternal grandfather was Andrew Hamilton of Monktonhall.

In 1687, at age three, he succeeded his father. His wardship was granted to George Baillie in 1692. He succeeded Sir Francis Hamilton, 3rd Baronet, to the name but not the lands of Innerwick in 1714. His family, the Hamiltons of Innerwick, acquired their lands in the fourteenth century.

== Career ==
At the 1727 British general election, Hamilton was returned unopposed as Member of Parliament for Linlithgowshire with the backing of Lord Hopetoun. He was appointed Secretary for Scotland to the Prince of Wales by 1733. He was returned again for Linlithgowshire after a contest at the 1734 British general election. He voted with the Administration in all recorded divisions. He did not stand at the 1741 British general election. He was given a place as Postmaster General for Scotland in 1746, holding the post for the rest of his life.

== Personal life ==
He married before 1724, Lady Margaret Kerr (1691–1768), daughter of William Kerr, 2nd Marquess of Lothian and Lady Jane Campbell, the third daughter of Archibald Campbell, 9th Earl of Argyll. Together, they were the parents of:

- James Hamilton, who was keeper of His Majesty's Stores, appointed as of Chattam, and succeeded his father.
- Alexander Hamilton
- Col. Archibald Hamilton (1728–1795), who married the Alice Colden, daughter of Alexander Colden and granddaughter of Cadwallader Colden, a colonial governor of New York.
- Jean Douglas Hamilton, who married Alexander Hay of Mordington (d. 1788).

Hamilton died on 28 December 1763 leaving five sons and a daughter.

=== Descendants ===
Through his eldest son James, he was a grandfather of Alexander James Hamilton (b. 1755), who served in the 45th Regiment and fought in America from 1776 to 1778, when he married Mary Deane (1759–1851), daughter of Irish-born Richard Deane of New York, where Hamilton thereafter resided.

Parliament of Great Britain
Preceded by George Dundas	Member of Parliament for Linlithgowshire; 1727–1741	Succeeded by George Dundas
