= Erskine Nicolson, 3rd Baron Carnock =

British peer and sailor (1884-1982)

Erskine Arthur Nicolson
- Born: 26 March 1884; Athens, Greece
- Died: 2 October 1982 (aged 98)
- Education: Royal Naval College, Dartmouth
- Known for: British peer and sailor
- Predecessor: Frederick Archibald Nicolson
- Successor: David Nicolson
- Spouse: Katharine Frederica Albertha (m. 1919; died 1982)
- Children: David Nicolson; A younger son and daughter
- Parents: Arthur Nicolson (father); Mary Catharine Hamilton (mother)
- Awards: Legion of Honour - Knight (1916)

Erskine ("Eric") Arthur Nicolson, 3rd Baron Carnock DSO, JP (26 March 1884 – 2 October 1982), styled The Honourable from 1916 until 1952, was a British peer and sailor.

== Background and education ==
Born in Athens, Nicolson was the second son of Arthur Nicolson, 1st Baron Carnock, at that time chargé d'affaires at the British legation. His mother was Mary Catharine, the daughter of Archibald Rowan-Hamilton, a soldier in the 5th Dragoon Guards. In 1952, Nicolson succeeded his older brother Frederick as Baron Carnock. A third brother was the author Harold Nicolson. When James Lees-Milne was writing his biography of Harold Nicolson, he visited Lord Carnock, at this point in his mid-nineties and living in a Devon nursing home; he "opined that Harold was a liar and a coward and not worth a biography".

== Military career ==
Nicolson entered the Royal Navy and was educated at the Royal Naval College, Dartmouth, called HMS Britannia. In 1912, he was awarded an Officer of the Order of the Crown of Italy for his participation in the British rescue mission after the 1908 Messina earthquake. He went to the Royal Naval Staff College in 1913 and afterwards became a war staff officer in a light cruiser squadron, fighting in the First World War. For his services in France, Nicolson was appointed a knight of the Legion of Honour on 15 September 1916.

After the war he was decorated with the Distinguished Service Order in 1919 and received also the Order of St Anne of Russia. He retired as a commander in 1924 and was nominated a Justice of the Peace for the county of Devon.

== Family ==
On 9 October 1919, Nicolson married Katharine Frederica Albertha, eldest daughter of Henry Lopes, 1st Baron Roborough. They had three children, one daughter and two sons. His wife died in 1968 and Nicolson survived her until 2 October 1982. He was succeeded in the barony by his older son David Nicolson, 4th Baron Carnock.

== Notes ==
Peerage of the United Kingdom
| Preceded by Frederick Nicolson | Baron Carnock; 1952–1982 | Succeeded by David Nicolson |
