= Thomas Nicolson of Carnock =

Sir Thomas Nicolson of Carnock, 1st Baronet (Before 1605 – 8 January 1646) was a Scottish lawyer, landowner, commissioner for Stirlingshire, and postmaster.

== Early life ==
According to some sources, he was the son of John Nicolson of Lasswade (died 1605) and Elizabeth (née Henderson) Nicolson. His father was a practising advocate at Edinburgh. His elder brother was Sir John Nicolson of Lasswade (grandfather of Sir John Nicolson, 2nd Baronet), was created a baronet in 1629 and died in 1651. Other writers state thate his father was Thomas Nicolson of Cockburnspath (died 1625), commissary of Aberdeen.

His paternal grandparents were James Nicolson (the Burgess of Edinburgh and of Sheriff Clerk of Aberdeen) and Janet (née Swinton) Nicolson and his maternal grandparents were Edward Henderson (son of George Henderson, 2nd of Fordell) and Helen (née Swinton) Henderson. His grandmothers were sisters, both being daughters of Sir John Swinton, 18th of that Ilk.

== Career ==
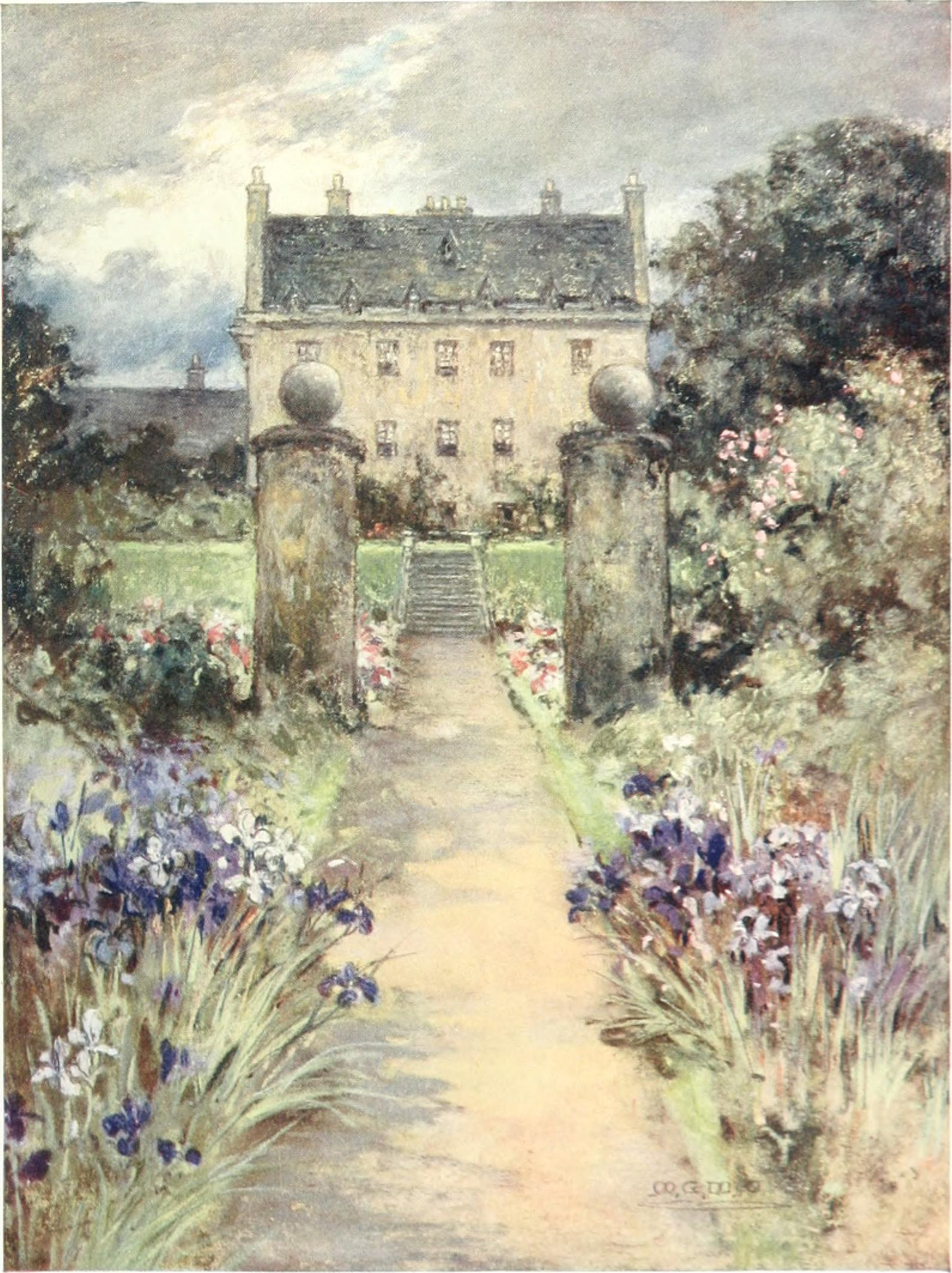
Carnock House, Stirlingshire, (demolished)

An advocate from 1612, in 1623 Nicolson was rewarded with the office of postmaster of Cockburnspath for his assistance to John Murray, 1st Earl of Annandale.

In 1634, Nicolson bought Carnock House near Stirling from John Drummond the grandson of Robert Drummond of Carnock. His son John Drummond of Drummondshall married Margaret Rollock, daughter of his business partner John Rollock, and their lands became the Bannockburn estate. Nicolson was said to have been a great patron and encourager of the minister James Guthrie.

He was created Baronet Nicolson of Carnock, Nova Scotia on 16 January 1637, and he decorated his house at Carnock with his new heraldry in stone and plasterwork. Historic Environment Scotland has some plasterwork from a ceiling from the house including the Nova Scotia arms of Nicolson of Carnock.

A number of Nicolson's letters and charters are held by the National Archives of Scotland.

== Personal life ==
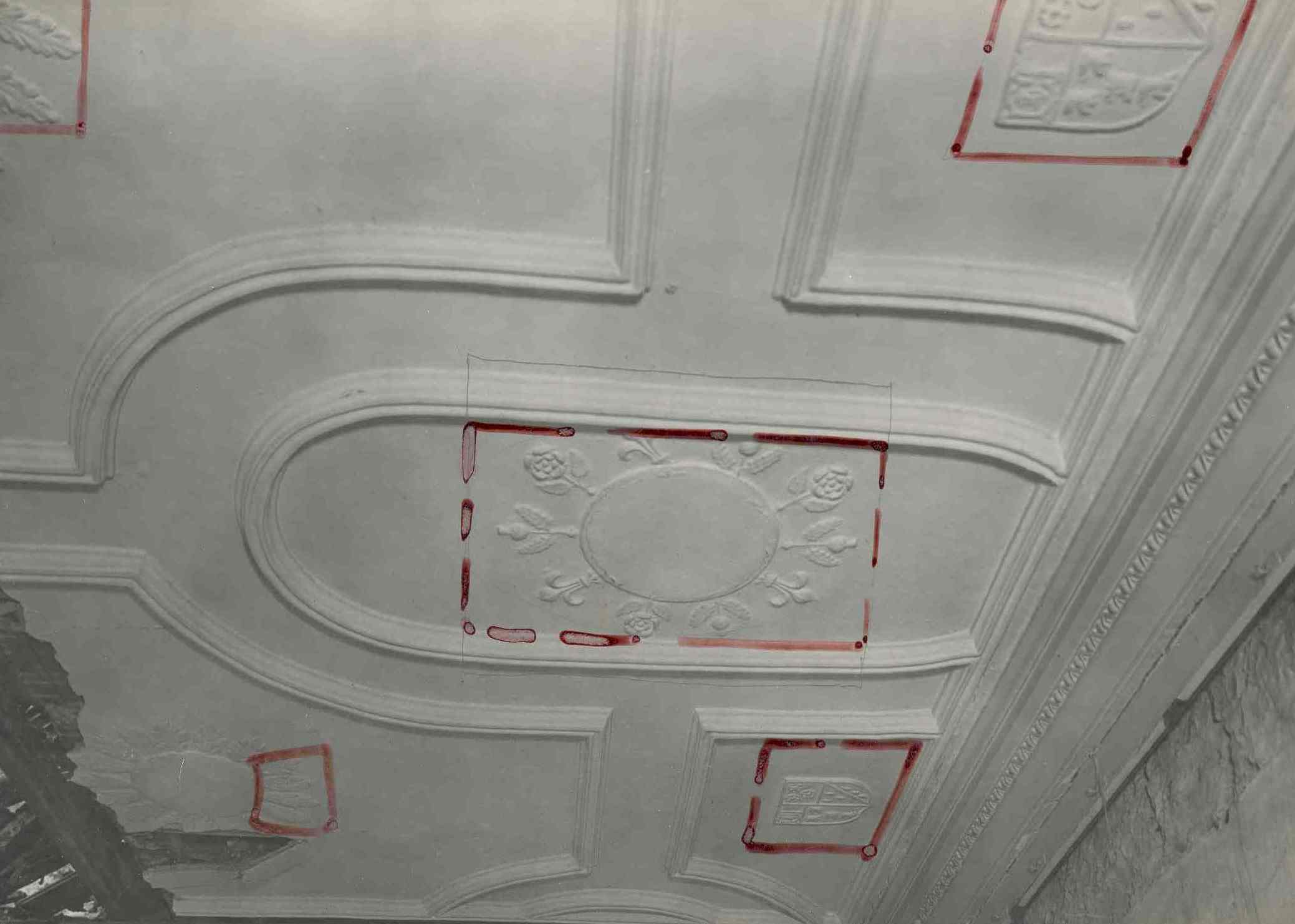
Ceiling of Carnock House during demolition in 1942 (Historic Environment Scotland)

Nicolson married Isobel Henderson, a daughter of Walter Henderson of Granton. Their children included:

- Elizabeth Nicolson, who married Thomas Drummond of Riccarton.
- Ann Nicolson, who married Sir George Stirling, 6th of Keir and 3rd of Cawder, son of Sir James Stirling, as his third wife in 1654.
- Sir Thomas Nicolson (1628–1664), who married Lady Margaret Livingstone, daughter of Alexander Livingston, 2nd Earl of Linlithgow and Lady Mary Douglas (daughter of William Douglas, 10th Earl of Angus).
- Sir John Nicolson of Tillicoultry (1629–1683), who married Sabina Colyear, daughter of Colonel Walter Colyear.
- Jane Nicolson, who made her brother John her heir.

Sir Nicolson died on 8 January 1646 and was succeeded by his eldest son, who became Sir Thomas Nicolson of Carnock, 2nd Baronet.

=== Descendants ===
Through his eldest son Sir Thomas, he was a grandfather of Margaret Nicolson (mother of Alexander Hamilton of Ballincrieff, MP for Linlithgowshire and Margaret Nicolson, wife of William Kerr, 3rd Marquess of Lothian) and Thomas Nicolson (1649–1670), who married Jean Napier and succeeded Sir Thomas as the 3rd Baronet in 1664. The 3rd Baronet was the father of Thomas Nicolson (1669–1688), who became the 4th Baronet as well as the 4th Lord Napier, which he inherited from his maternal uncle, Archibald Napier, 3rd Lord Napier. As the 4th Baronet died in 1688, unmarried and childless, the Carnock estate and the baronetcy passed to his paternal uncle, the 1st Baronets grandson, Sir Thomas Nicolson, 5th Baronet (d. 1699).

Baronetage of Nova Scotia
New creation	Baronet (of Carnock); 1637–1646	Succeeded by Thomas Nicolson
