= Robert Drummond of Carnock =

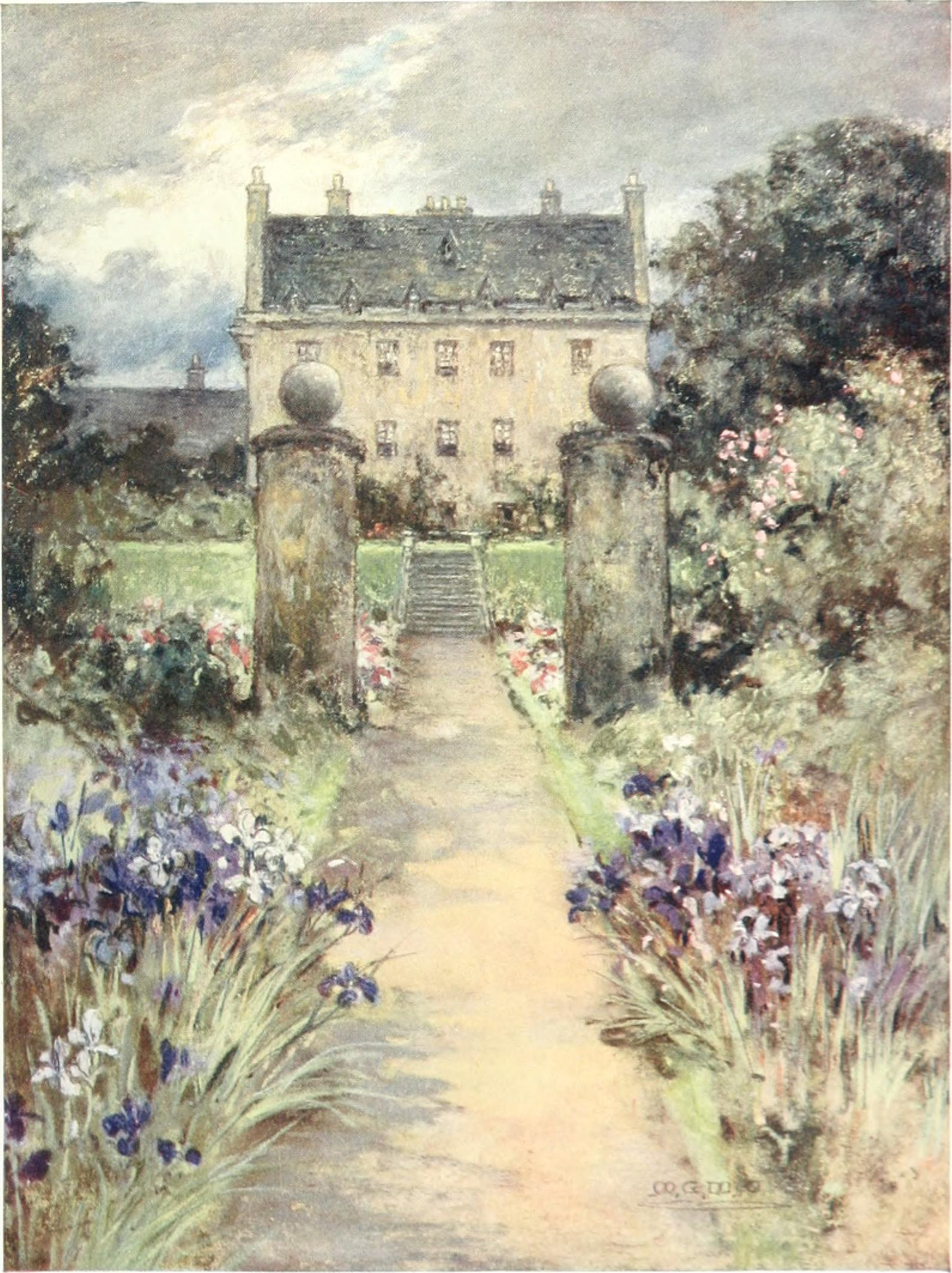
Watercolour of Carnock House from Herbert Maxwell, Scottish Gardens (1908)

Sir Robert Drummond of Carnock (died 1592) was Master of Work to the Crown of Scotland from 1579 to 1583. This was the responsibility for building and repair of palaces and castles. His appointment was made to be "as Sir James Hamilton of Finnart had it."

== Life ==
Robert Drummond was the eldest son of Alexander Drummond, of Carnock and Arnmore (Ernmore), and Marjory Bruce of Auchinbowie. Arnmore is a location at Kippen, Stirlingshire, neighbouring Broich, the home of William Schaw, his successor as Master of Work who is regarded as a founder of Freemasonry.

Alexander Drummond had been a supporter of the Earl of Angus and went with him to exile to England in 1529. Carnock, the location, is to the east of Stirling. Robert built up the Carnock lands into a holding recognised as a free barony.

Robert's first wife, Agnes (or Margaret), was a sister of Sir William Kirkcaldy of Grange. With Robert's permission, Agnes Kirkcaldy sold a tenement in Dysart called the "Slate House" in 1540. Agnes's sister Elizabeth married John Mowbray grandson of Robert Barton of Over Barnton. Some time after 1542, Robert married Marjorie Elphinstone, the sister of his neighbour Lord Elphinstone. She seems to be noted as "Margere Helfiston" among the companions of Mary of Guise during her trip to France in 1550.

In 1553 the affairs of Lord Elphinstone were put in the hands of Lord Erskine, John Drummond of Innerpeffray, and Robert Drummond of Carnock. He was knighted as a supporter of Henry Stuart, Lord Darnley, in 1565. He had fought for Darnley's father, Matthew Stewart, 4th Earl of Lennox, against Regent Arran at Glasgow Muir in 1544.

"Dominus Drummond", as he is referred to in the Annals of Dunfermline, is said to have been responsible for the repairs to Dunfermline Abbey in 1570. A family contract concerning the lands of a kinsman Henry Drummond of Riccarton made in 1575 suggest that Robert had some influence with Regent Morton, able to forward his family business with Scotland's ruler.

== Surveying the Scottish royal palaces ==
Robert Drummond was appointed master of work on 6 May 1579. As an architect his significance lies in the inventory of repairs for royal palaces of 7 May 1583 with its appreciation of the landscape around Stirling Castle, with its river valleys dotted with the castles of the Scottish nobility. Drummond hoped to design and build a gallery and roof terrace on the west quarter of the palace to appreciate the views. He also intended to re-site the royal chapel. In the words of his estimate:

"The westquarter thairof to be all tane downe to the ground thane to big and beild the same up agane in the maist plesand maner that can be devyssit: quhilk quarter off the said paleys is the best and maist plesand situatioune off ony of his hienes palayes by ressone it will have the maist plesand sycht of all the foure airthis (directions), in speciall park and gairdin, deer thairin, up the riverais of Forthe, Teyth, Allone, and Guddy to Lochlomwnd, ane sycht rownd about in all pairtis and downe to the revear of Forthe quhair thar standis many greit stane howssis"

The west quarter thereof to be all taken down to the ground then to build the same up again in the most pleasant manner that can be divised: which quarter of the said palace is the best and most pleasant situation of any of his majesty's palaces by reason it will have the most pleasant sight of all the four directions, especially the park and garden, the deer there, up the rivers of Forth, Teith, Allan, and Guddy, to Loch Lomond, a sight round about in all parts and down to the river of Forth where there stands many great stone houses.

Nothing was done to the west quarter of Stirling Palace at this time, and by 1625 a part of the building had fallen down the hillside. The rest of quarter survives as a passage or gallery used in 1594 during the baptism of Prince Henry. Drummond also predicted that a dilapidated part of Linlithgow Palace was in danger of collapse, and recommended immediate intervention. The building fell twenty years later;

"Item the westquarter of the Paleys of Lythquow is altogidder lyk to fall downe that ane hunder pundis will do mair presently to the said work nor ane thowsand pundis will do quhen it is fallin downe."

Item the west quarter of the Palace of Linlithgow is altogether likely to fall down, that £100 will do more presently to the said work than £1000 will do when it is fallen down.

Drummond did not have an opportunity to carry out these works. His successor William Schaw rebuilt the chapel in 1594. Drummond's only certain works are repairs and alterations to roof and parapet at Doune Castle and some repairs at Stirling Castle.

== The "Association" and the Ruthven Regime ==
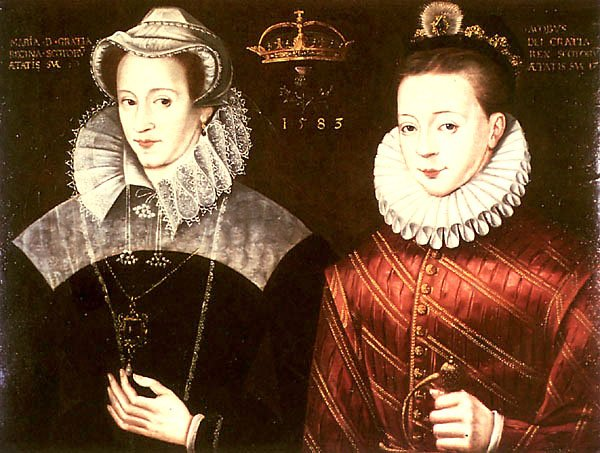
A double portrait at Blair Castle of Mary, Queen of Scots and James VI by an anonymous artist dated 1583 may reflect plans for Mary to return to Scotland and rule in "association" with her son.

In 1582 Robert's eldest son Patrick Drummond of Monzie feuar of Carnock, was involved in the Ruthven Raid. In July 1583 he lost his court role as a master of the stable and went into exile in England. His brother John Drummond of Slipperfield and Hawthornden was also discharged from his place as usher. Robert's son-in-law Adam Erskine, Commendator of Cambuskenneth, was a leader of the Gowrie regime. These connections may have led to Robert's replacement as royal master of work by William Schaw before November 1583, after the fall of the Gowrie Regime.

Robert Drummond's inventory of repairs of May 1583 makes provision for Mary, Queen of Scots, or perhaps the potential bride of James VI, at Stirling Castle suggesting the rebuilding the Chapel Royal to accommodate ladies in waiting in a loft or gallery:

"to tak away the cheppell and to big the same neirby the northe bak wall in ane other sort of biging, to the pwrpois oure Queyne withe hir tryne of ladyis may pas forthe off this new devissit work into the said chappell loft"

to take away the chapel and to build the same nearby the north back wall in another sort of building, to the purpose our Queen with her train of ladies may pass forth from this new devised work into the said chapel loft.

The estimate demonstrates Drummond's involvement with the Ruthven regime and, perhaps, its cynical negotiation with Queen Elizabeth I for the "Association of Mary, Queen of Scots, and James VI" in 1583. This was a plan for Mary, Queen of Scots, to enter into joint rule in Scotland with her son, James VI. A double portrait of Mary and James of 1583 was made for this negotiation.

Drummond crossed the Tweed into exile in England at Wark Castle on 27 April 1584 with the Earl of Angus and his followers.

== Family, estate, and coal ==
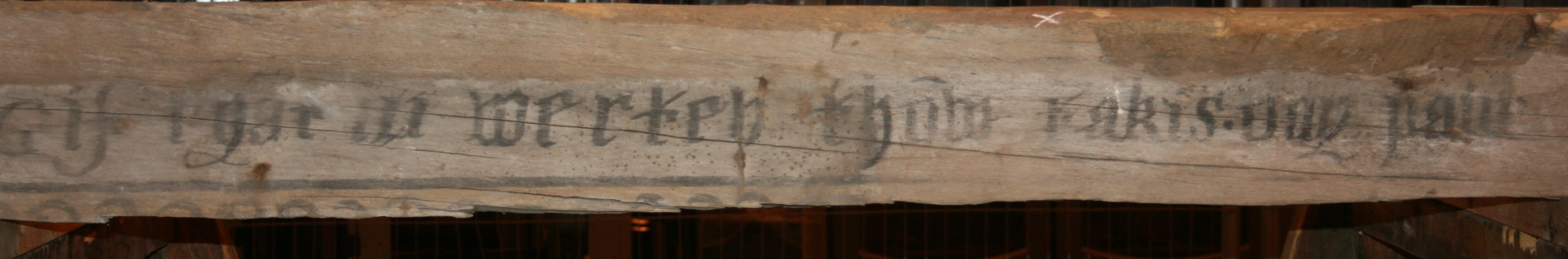
Beam from Carnock House, with inscription: "Gif that in werteu thow takis ony paine", (HES)

Robert Drummond had coal mines in his lands. He supplied coal for domestic uses to the town of Stirling and made an agreement with William Bell, a merchant in Stirling, to set and use a standard measure for a "burgess load", for coal supplied from his mine of Bannockburn. Drummond's agreement with the town's officials was recorded in the official Register of Deeds, a register of obligations still preserved at the General Register House in Edinburgh.

Drummond's own house at Carnock in Stirlingshire was demolished in 1941. It was abandoned and unsafe due to subsidence caused by essential coalworking during the 1914-18 war. It had an interesting plan with two staircases. The armorial panel of 1548 with his coat of arms and that of Marjorie Elphinstone can be seen at Sissinghurst Castle Garden. Painted ceiling boards and the front door of the house are displayed at Stirling Smith Museum and Art Gallery. The oak beams from the ceiling, retained by Historic Environment Scotland have been dated to 1589 and carry inscriptions exhorting moral precepts, some from the Bible, some from the Stoic philosopher Gaius Musonius Rufus, perhaps following the English author William Baldwin although using Scottish spellings. Two now incomplete lines are: "Gif that in werteu thow takis ony paine ..." and "Naikit I cam into the warld ..." The use of the first of these mottoes reflects the schoolroom of James VI at Stirling Castle, where he penned a Latin version into a catalogue of his library compiled by his tutor Peter Young. Mary I of England wrote an English version in her Book of Hours. Historic Environment Scotland also has some plasterwork from a later ceiling from the house including the Nova Scotia arms of Nicolson of Carnock.

Midhope Castle, filmed as the Lallybroch setting in Outlander, belonged to a brother, Alexander Drummond. Possibly changes and alteration at Midhope were due to his brother, the master of work. Another brother, Charles, was Provost of Linlithgow.

== Later life ==
Drummond, his son-in-law Adam Erskine, Commendator of Cambuskenneth, and his sons Patrick, John, Robert, and William, were accused by Duncan Forrester of Queenshaugh of threatening him. In July 1586 when Forrester was travelling from Kirkliston to Edinburgh, William Drummond shot at him with a pistol. James Drummond, Commendator of Inchaffray, agreed to offer £1,000 as a caution for their good behaviour.

In 1587 Carnock got into difficulties selling a property to Thomas Forrester of Durrishall, and Carnock, Bannockburn and his Stirling townhouse were obtained for a time by Lord Doune.

Robert was witness at the christening in Stirling on 19 October 1589 of Mr William Drummond and Christine Brodie's daughter Janet.

He died in 1592.

== Epitaph ==
The poet Alexander Montgomerie who flourished at the court of James VI in the same years as Drummond wrote an epitaph to the architect. The poem speaks of Robert Drummond as a leader in building and planting in Scotland. In the manuscript volume of Montgomerie's poems called the "Ker Manuscript" Drummond's name was added to the title by his grandson, the poet William Drummond of Hawthornden.

Stay Passinger thy Mynd, thy futt, thy ee,
Vouchsaif a we his Epitaph to vieu
Quha left bot feu, behind him sik as he
Syn leirnd to de to live agane aneu.

All knoues this treu, who noble Carnok kneu.

This Realme may reu that he is gone to grave.
All buildings brave bids DROMMOND nou adeu;
Quhais lyf furthsheu he lude thame by the laiv.
Quhair sall we craiv sik policie to haiv?
Quha with him straiv to polish, build or plante?
These giftis I grant god lent him by the Laiv.

(modernised spelling)

Stay Passenger thy mind, thy foot, thy eye,
Vouchsafe a while his epitaph to view
Who left but few, behind him such as he
Since learned to die to live again anew

All knows this true, who noble CARNOCK knew.

This Realm may rue that he is gone to grave.
All buildings brave bid Drummond now adieu,
Whose life demonstrated he loved them more than any other.
Where now shall we seek building and estate improvement?
Who with him strive to adorn, build or plant?
These gifts, I grant, God lent him more than any other.

In Scottish folklore, Drummond's second wife Marjorie Elphinstone has been identified as the subject of the story of the "Lady with the Ring". After the death of his grandson in 1636, Carnock was sold to Thomas Nicolson a member of the Clan Nicolson family, holders of the title Baron of Carnock, a Nova Scotia baronetcy.

== Children ==
Robert's children included:

- Margaret Drummond, daughter of Agnes Kirkcaldy, married Alexander Erskine, Commendator of Cambuskenneth, her daughter Annabella married Sir John Buchanan of that Ilk.
- Patrick Drummond of Monzie, feuar of Carnock, royal master stabler, who married Margaret Scott heiress of Monzie. His son Alexander Drummond inherited Carnock and married Elizabeth Hepburn, his son Alexander (d.1645) married Margaret Rollo, and was killed at the battle of Alford. A daughter Margaret married James Kinross younger of Kippenross.
- John Drummond of Slipperfield and Hawthornden, royal usher, who married Susanna Fowler, daughter of Janet Fockart, and was father of the poet William Drummond of Hawthornden.
- William Drummond, a student at St Andrews with disputed appointment as Canon of Alloway in 1571.
- Edward Drummond, son of Marjorie Elphinstone.
- Agnes Drummond, married James Lockhart, younger of Lee.

| Preceded by (1) William MacDowall (2) John Scrimgeour of Myres | Master of Work to the Crown of Scotland; 1579–1583 | Succeeded by William Schaw |
