= Helen Nicholson =

Helen Nicholson or Nicolson may refer to:

- Helen Nicholson (medical academic), New Zealand medical academic specialising in male reproductive health
- Helen Nicolson (child psychiatrist), British child psychiatrist
- Helen J. Nicholson, British historian
- Helen Thayer, née Nicholson, New Zealand-born explorer in the United States
