= Thomas Nicolson =

Thomas Nicolson or Nicholson may refer to:

- Thomas Nicolson of Carnock (died 1646), commissioner for Stirlingshire
- Sir Thomas Nicolson, 6th Baronet (died 1693), of the Nicolson baronets
- Thomas Nicolson (bishop) (1645–1718), Roman Catholic bishop
- Thomas Nicolson, 4th Lord Napier (1669–1688), Scottish peer
- Sir Thomas Nicolson, 1st Baronet (died 1728), of the Nicolson baronets
- Thomas Nicholson (architect) (1823–1895), British architect
- Thomas Nicholson (rugby union) (fl. 1893), English international rugby union player
- Thomas Nicholson (cricketer) (1876–1939), English cricketer
- Tom Nicolson (1879–1951), British track and field athlete
- Thomas Nicholson (educator), American health educator and drug policy specialist

== See also ==
- Nickolson Thomas (born 1982), Trinidadian footballer
