= MacNicol =

MacNicol is a surname. It is a patronymic form of the personal name Nicol, which is a form of Nicholas. It comes from both German and Celtic origins.

Notable people with the surname include:

- Bessie MacNicol (1869–1904), Scottish painter
- Donald MacNicol (1735–1802), Scottish clergyman
- John Ritchie MacNicol (1878–1950), Canadian politician
- Quinn MacNicol (born 2008), Australian soccer player
- Peter MacNicol (born 1954), American actor

== See also ==
- MacNicol (crater), crater on Mercury
- Clan MacNeacail, sometimes known as Clan MacNicol, Scottish clan long associated with the Isle of Skye
