= Nicol =

Nicol is a unisex given name and a surname. Notable people with the name include:

== Given name ==
- Nicol Allan (1931–2019), American artist
- Nicol Anderson (1882–1953), British Anglican priest
- Nicol Hugh Baird (1796–1849), Scottish surveyor
- Nicol Burne (fl. 1574–1598), Scottish Roman Catholic controversialist
- Nicol Camacho (born 1999), Colombian footballer
- Nicol Čupková (born 1992), Slovak ice hockey player
- Nicol Dalgleish, 16th-century minister of the Church of Scotland
- Nicol Alexander Dalzell (1817–1877), Scottish botanist
- Nicol David (born 1983), Malaysian squash player
- Nicol Delago (born 1996), Italian alpine skier
- Nicol Galanderian (1881–1944), Armenian composer
- Nicol Gastaldi (born 1990), Argentinian alpine skier
- Nicol Mac Flainn (fl. 1283), archbishop-elect of Tuam, Ireland
- Nicol McColl (1812–1878), Canadian farmer and political figure
- Nicol Mostert (born 1985), South African rugby union player
- Nicol Muschat (1695–1721), Scottish physician
- Nicol Nicolson, Scottish broadcast journalist
- Nicol Paone, American comedian, director, water, and actress
- Nicol Perez (born 1993), American youth politician
- Nicol Pitro (born 1975), German badminton player
- Nicol Ó Duibhghiolla (fl. 1574–1598), Bishop of Kilmacduagh
- Nicol Ó Leaáin (fl. 1358–1393), Bishop of Kilmacduagh
- Nicol Raidman (born 11 June 1986), Israeli businesswoman
- Nicol Ruprecht (born 1992), Austrian rhythmic gymnast
- Nicol Sanhueza (born 1992), Chilean footballer
- Nicol Smith (1873–1905), Scottish footballer
- Nicol Smith (writer), American writer
- Nicol Sponberg (born 1970), American Christian music singer
- Nicol Stenhouse (1806–1873), Scottish-Australian lawyer and writer
- Nicol Stephen (born 1960), Scottish politician
- Nicol Uddert (c. 1550 – c. 1610), Scottish merchant
- Nicol Voronkov (born 2001), Israeli rhythmic gymnast
- Nicol Williamson (1936–2011), Scottish actor

== Surname ==
- Nicol (surname), list of people with the surname

== See also ==
- Nicol prism
- Nikol
- Nicoll
- Nichol
- Nicholl
- Nicols
- Nicholls
- Nicola
- Nicole
- Nicolle
- Nicolson
- McNicol
- MacNicol
