= Luisa Vertova =

Italian art historian (1920–2021)

Luisa Felicita Vertova
- Born: 30 December 1920; Firenze, Italy
- Died: 28 June 2021 (aged 100); Florence, Italy
- Occupation: Art historian
- Years active: 1943–2020
- Spouse: Benedict Nicolson
- Children: 1 (Vanessa Nicolson)

Luisa Felicita Vertova (30 December 1920 – 28 June 2021) was an Italian art historian. Her research work mostly focused on Renaissance Italian painters such as Piero della Francesca, Mantegna, Paolo Veronese, Titian, Botticelli and Caravaggio. In addition, she undertook numerous projects as editor of several editions of her mentor Bernard Berenson's and her husband Benedict Nicolson's writings.

== Early life and education ==
Vertova was born to philosopher Giacomo Vertova, a descendant of a noble family in Bergamo. Giacomo Vertova was forced out of his university teaching job due to his anti-fascist ideals. Despite his liberal views, he was described as "intolerant and authoritarian" and led a strict household. Vertova had two siblings, brother Gino and sister Nori.

Vertova spent her childhood in Florence, Italy, but when she was six the family moved from Florence to a villa in Fiesole, Italy with their extended family.

Vertova originally wanted to be an artist, but art school was considered unsuitable for a girl from a "good family." Vertova studied art history and archaeology at the University of Florence in the 1940s.

== Career ==
During the German occupation of Italy, Vertova survived with her knowledge of the German language. At about this time, anti-fascist friends of her father's took her to meet Bernard Berenson, who was under house arrest at Villa I Tatti, in the outskirts of Florence. Two years later, he learned she was ill and malnourished, and so invited her to villa I Tatti to recover. Although she had been awarded a postgraduate bursary to study in Germany, she turned that down - and remained at i Tatti until her marriage. Vertova impressed Berenson and became his assistant, working on his photographic collection, and remained so even after moving to London. She worked with Elisabetta "Nicky" Mariano and Berenson until his death in 1959.

Vertova was a consultant for Christie's and curated their catalogs. She worked as Old Master Paintings and Drawings Specialist and from the 1960s to the 1980s, she was advisor for most auctions for Christie's in Milan, Florence, and Rome.

In 2018, Vertova gave the Federico Zeri Foundation her archive of art books, auction catalogs, photos and other documents from her time at Christie's. " Most of the photographs – gelatin silver prints and negative film – are of works of 19th-century Italian art as documented by major photographic studios: Cooper of London, Boccardi of Rome, Luigi Artini of Florence."

== Marriage and children ==
Vertova met Benedict Nicolson at villa i Tatti while they were both guests of Berenson. They married on 8 August 1955 in the Palazzo Vecchio in Florence, Italy. There was conflict between Vertova and her family because of gossip that Nicolson was homosexual, but he had already told her. One year later, they had a daughter, Vanessa Pepita Giovanna Nicolson in 1956.

At the end of 1955, she moved to England with Nicolson. Vertova felt "isolated and trapped" in England after leaving her career and family in Italy. She had "been her own person, a respected art historian, rather than just 'Mrs. Benedict Nicolson.'" They divorced in 1962.

Vertova's relationship with her daughter Vanessa was loving but complex and often difficult.

== Works ==
- Botticelli (Electa, Florence, 1949)
- Giovanni Bellini (Electa, Florence, 1949)
- Mantegna (Electa, Florence, 1950)
- Tiziano (Electa, Florence, 1951)
- Vittore Carpaccio|Carpaccio (Electa, Florence, 1952)
- L'Arco di Costantino o Della decadenza della forma With Berenson, B. (Milan, 1952)
- Botticelli (Vol.3 of Art et artistes: Série les peintres) (Hatier, Paris, 1952)
- Mantegna (Art et artistes) (Hatier, Paris, 1952)
- Fra Angelico (Vol.8 of Art et artistes) (Hatier, Paris, 1953)
- Veronese (Electa, Florence, 1953)
- Vittore Carpaccio|Carpaccio (Electa, Florence, 1954)
- I disegni dei pittori fiorentini With Berenson, B. & Mariano, N. (Milan, 1961)
- I Cenacoli Fiorentini (ERI, 1965)
- Firenze: I Tatti (EDAM, Florence, 1969)
- Giulio Licino (1976)
- Carlo Ceresa: un pittore bergamasco nel '600 (Bergamo, 1983)
- Carlo Ceresa (Bolis, 1984)
- Caravaggism in Europe With Nicolson, B. (Allemandi, Turin, 1989)
- Ben Nicolson (Pitti arte e libri, Florence, 1991)
- Luisa Vertova (Pitti arte e libri, Florence, 1991)
