= Benedict Nicolson =

British art historian (1914–1978)

Lionel Benedict Nicolson MVO
- Born: 6 August 1914; Sissinghurst Castle, Kent, England
- Died: 22 May 1978 (aged 63); Sissinghurst Castle, Kent, England
- Resting place: Trinity Church Cemetery, Sissinghurst, Kent
- Education: Eton College
- Alma mater: Balliol College, Oxford
- Occupations: Art historian & author
- Spouse: Luisa Vertova (m. 1955; div. 1962)
- Children: 1
- Parents: Harold Nicolson (father); Vita Sackville-West (mother)
- Relatives: Nigel Nicolson (brother)
- Military career
- Allegiance: United Kingdom
- Branch: British Army
- Service years: 1939-1945
- Rank: Captain
- Unit: Intelligence Corps
- Conflicts: World War II

Lionel Benedict Nicolson MVO (6 August 1914 – 22 May 1978) was a British art historian and author. He was the author of The Painters of Ferrara (1950) and Hendrick Terbrugghen (1958).

== Biography ==
Nicolson was born on 6 August 1914. He was the elder son of authors Harold Nicolson and Vita Sackville-West and the brother of writer and politician Nigel. His godmothers were Violet Trefusis, Olive Custance and Rosamund Grosvenor.

The boys grew up at Sissinghurst Castle, in the rural depths of Kent, surrounded by the renowned gardens that are now run by the National Trust. Nicolson was educated at Eton College and Balliol College, Oxford, studying modern history. In 1939, he was appointed Deputy Surveyor of the King's Pictures under Kenneth Clark, but soon after, war was declared and he joined the Intelligence Corps, rising to the rank of captain. In 1945 he resumed his Royal post as Deputy Surveyor, then under Anthony Blunt.

After being appointed a MVO, Nicolson resigned from the Royal Household in 1947 and became editor of The Burlington Magazine (1947–1978). Nicolson spent much of his life collecting photographs of early seventeenth-century works in the Caravaggio manner which he wrote about in The Burlington Magazine and which eventually filled three large volumes.

=== Personal life ===
He was bisexual and had relationships with men and women. He was married on 8 August 1955 to Luisa Vertova, the elder daughter of Professor Giacomo Vertova of Florence, with whom he had a daughter, Vanessa Pepita Giovanna (b. 1956). He divorced in 1962.

Nicolson died on 22 May 1978 and was buried in Trinity Church Cemetery in Sissinghurst, Kent, adjacent to his father.

== Archive and library ==
Nicolson's archive is in the Paul Mellon Centre where it is fully catalogued and available for consultation. The archive includes material created and collected by Nicolson, largely in a personal rather than professional capacity, throughout his life. The majority pertains to 1933–1939. The collection primarily includes journals and correspondence.

== Ancestors ==
Ancestors of Benedict Nicolson

16. Maj.-Gen. Sir William Nicolson, 9th Baronet, of Carnock
8. Adm. Sir Frederick Nicolson, 10th Baronet, of Carnock
17. Mary Russell
4. Arthur Nicolson, 1st Baron Carnock
18. James Loch
9. Mary Loch
19. Ann Orr
2. The Hon. Sir Harold Nicolson
20. Cap. Gawin William Rowan-Hamilton
10. Cap. Archibald Rowan-Hamilton
21. Catherine Cockburn
5. Mary Katherine Rowan-Hamilton
22. Rev. George Caldwell
11. Catherine Anne Caldwell
23. Harriet Abdy
1. Benedict Nicolson
24. George Sackville-West, 5th Earl De La Warr
12. The. Hon. William Edward Sackville-West
25. Lady Elizabeth Sackville, 1st Baroness Buckhurst
6. Lionel Sackville-West, 3rd Baron Sackville
26. George Dodwell
13. Georgina Dodwell
27. Victoria Gethin
3. The Hon. Vita Sackville-West
28. George Sackville-West, 5th Earl De La Warr (= 24)
14. Lionel Sackville-West, 2nd Baron Sackville
29. Lady Elizabeth Sackville, 1st Baroness Buckhurst (= 25)
7. Victoria Sackville-West
30. Pedro Durán
15. Josefa Durán y Ortega
31. Catalina Ortega

== Works ==
- The Painters of Ferrara (1950)
- Hendrick Terbrugghen (1958)
- Wright of Derby: Painter of Light (1968)
- The Treasures of the Foundling Hospital (1972)
- Courbet: The Studio of the Painter (1973)
- Georges de La Tour (1974)

== Sources ==
- Playing by the Rules - Kennedy Fraser
- Dictionary of Art Historians

== See also ==
- List of Bloomsbury Group people

Court offices
Preceded by ?	Deputy Surveyor of the King's Pictures; 1939–1947	Succeeded by Oliver Millar
