= Juliet Nicolson =

British writer

Juliet Nicolson (born 9 June 1954) is a British author and journalist.

== Biography ==
Nicolson was born in Bransgore, England to the writer and publisher Nigel Nicolson and his wife Philippa Tennyson-d’Eyncourt, and grew up at Sissinghurst. She read English Literature at St Hugh’s College, Oxford.

She is the granddaughter of the writers Vita Sackville-West and Harold Nicolson. She is the sister of the writer Adam Nicolson, and the publisher Rebecca Nicolson.

== Writing ==
=== Publishing and journalism ===
Between 1976 and 1994, she worked in publishing, first in London before spending ten years in New York working for Grove Atlantic Publishers.

On returning to England in 1994 she became a literary agent at Ed Victor Ltd before becoming a freelance journalist in 2000 writing for publications including the Daily and Sunday Telegraph, The Guardian, the Evening Standard, The Spectator, and Harper's Bazaar where she is now a contributing editor.

=== Books ===
Nicolson has published five books, including three works of social history, one memoir and a novel. Three of these were selected as a BBC Radio 4 “Book of the Week”. The journalist Tina Brown has said: ‘Juliet Nicolson has invented a new kind of social history.’

The Perfect Summer (published 2006) focuses on one sweltering season in 1911. The Great Silence (published 2009) is about three consecutive November 11ths from 1918-1920. Frostquake (published 2021) tells the story of one locked-down, snowy winter of 1962-3.

Nicolson's memoir, A House Full of Daughters (published 2016) is an account of seven generations of daughters in her own family beginning with her great great grandmother, Pepita de Oliva, a Spanish flamenco dancer born in Malaga in 1830 and culminating with her granddaughter born in London in 2013.

Nicolson’s novel Abdication (published 2012) is set in 1936 against the backdrop of the British Royal Family’s famous constitutional crisis.

== Personal life ==
Nicolson has been married twice. Her first husband was James Macmillan-Scott, with whom she had two daughters. Her second husband is Charles Anson CVO, a former press secretary to Queen Elizabeth II.

== Books ==
- The Perfect Summer, Dancing into Shadow in 1911 (John Murray, 2006)
- The Great Silence 1918-20, Living in the Shadow of the Great War (John Murray, 2009)
- Abdication, a novel (Bloomsbury, 2012)
- A House Full of Daughters, a memoir (Chatto & Windus 2016)
- Frostquake, the frozen winter of 1962 and how Britain emerged a different country (Chatto & Windus, 2021)
- The Book of Revelations: Women and Their Secrets From the 1950s to the Present Day (Chatto & Windus, 2025)
