= Baron Carnock =

Barony in the Peerage of the United Kingdom

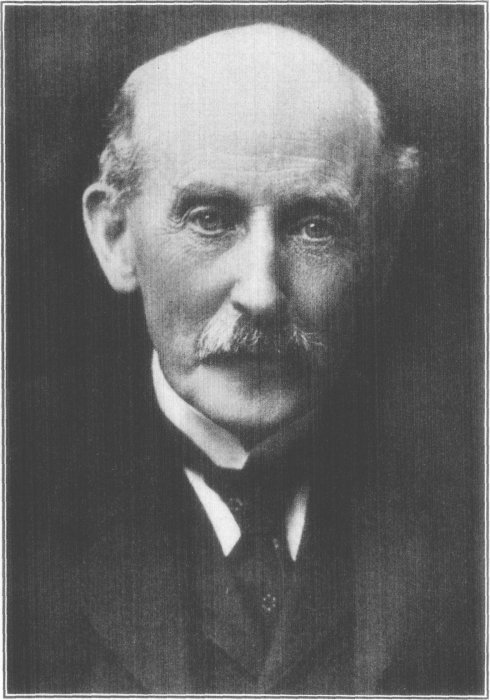
Arthur Nicolson, 1st Baron Carnock

Baron Carnock, of Carnock in the County of Stirling, is a title in the Peerage of the United Kingdom. It was created in 1916 for the former Permanent Under-Secretary in the Foreign Office, Sir Arthur Nicolson, 11th Baronet.

The Nicolson family descends from Thomas Nicolson. In 1636 he was created a Baronet, of Carnock in the County of Stirling, in the Baronetage of Nova Scotia. His great-grandson, the fourth Baronet, succeeded as the Fourth Lord Napier of Merchistoun in 1683. However, on his death three years later the barony passed to his maternal aunt Margaret Brisbane, while he was succeeded in the baronetcy by his cousin and heir-male, the fifth Baronet. He was succeeded by his son, the sixth Baronet. On the death of his younger son, the eighth Baronet, this line of the family failed. The latter was succeeded by his cousin, the ninth Baronet. He was a major-general in the Army, while his son, the tenth Baronet, was an admiral in the Royal Navy.

The latter was succeeded by his son, the eleventh Baronet. In 1916 he was raised to the peerage as Baron Carnock, of Carnock in the County of Stirling. His two eldest sons succeeded as second and third Baron, in 1928 and 1952; the fourth Baron succeeded his father in 1982. In 1984 Lord Carnock was recognised as thirteenth Baronet of that Ilk and of Lasswade and as Chief of Clan Nicolson by the Lord Lyon with the undifferenced arms of Nicolson. He was separately recognised in this title by the Registrar of the Baronetage. For earlier history of this title, see Nicolson Baronets. As of 2017 the titles are held by his cousin once removed, the fifth Baron. He is the son of the writer Nigel Nicolson and grandson of the famous diplomat Sir Harold Nicolson, who was the third son of the first Baron and husband of Vita Sackville-West.

The family seat is Perch Hill Farm, near Robertsbridge, East Sussex.

== Nicolson Baronets, of Carnock (1636) ==
- Sir Thomas Nicolson of Carnock (d. 1646)
- Sir Thomas Nicolson, 2nd Baronet (1628–1664)
- Sir Thomas Nicolson, 3rd Baronet (1649–1670)
- Sir Thomas Nicolson, 4th Lord Napier, 4th Baronet (1669–1688)
- Sir Thomas Nicolson, 5th Baronet (d. 1699)
- Sir George Nicolson, 6th Baronet (d. 1771)
- Sir Walter Philip Nicolson, 7th Baronet (d. 1786)
- Sir David Nicolson, 8th Baronet (d. 1806)
- Sir William Nicolson, 9th Baronet (1758–1820)
- Sir Frederick William Erskine Nicolson, 10th Baronet (1815–1899)
- Sir Arthur Nicolson, 11th Baronet (1849–1928) (created Baron Carnock in 1916)

== Barons Carnock (1916) ==
- Arthur Nicolson, 1st Baron Carnock (1849–1928)
- Frederick Archibald Nicolson, 2nd Baron Carnock (1883–1952)
- Erskine Arthur Nicolson, 3rd Baron Carnock (1884–1982)
- David Henry Arthur Nicolson, 4th Baron Carnock (1920–2008)
- Adam Nicolson, 5th Baron Carnock (b. 1957)

The heir apparent is the present holder's son the Hon. Thomas Nicolson (b. 1984).

== Arms ==
Coat of arms of Baron Carnock
Crest A lion issuant Or armed and langued Gules. Escutcheon Or three falcons' heads erased Gules armed Argent in fess point an inescutcheon Argent a saltire Azure surmounted of an inescutcheon Or charged with a lion rampant within a double tressure flory counterflory Gules ensigned of an Imperial Crown Proper being the addition of the arms of Nova Scotia as a baronet. Supporters Two eagles Or armed Gules. Motto Generositate; Nil Sistere Contra

== See also ==
- Lord Napier of Merchistoun
- Nicolson Baronets
- Robert Drummond of Carnock
