= Adam Nicolson =

British author (born 1957)

The Right Honourable The Lord Carnock FSA FSA Scot FRSL
- Born: 12 September 1957 (age 68); Bransgore, England
- Education: Magdalene College, Cambridge
- Occupation: Writer
- Spouse(s): Olivia Fane (divorced) Sarah Raven (m. 1992)
- Children: 5
- Relatives: Nigel Nicolson (father); Philippa née Tennyson-d'Eyncourt (mother); Vita Sackville-West (grandmother); Juliet Nicolson (sister)
- Writing career
- Period: 1981 to present
- Genres: History, memoir, nature, place

Adam Nicolson, FSA, FSA Scot, FRSL (born 12 September 1957) is an English author who has written about history, landscape, great literature and the sea. He is also the 5th Baron Carnock, but does not use the title.

== Biography ==
Adam Nicolson is the son of writer Nigel Nicolson and his wife Philippa Tennyson-d'Eyncourt. He is the grandson of the writers Vita Sackville-West and Sir Harold Nicolson, and great-grandson of Sir Eustace Tennyson d'Eyncourt and Arthur Nicolson, 1st Baron Carnock. He was educated at Eaton House, Summer Fields School, Eton College where he was a King's Scholar, and Magdalene College, Cambridge. He has worked as a journalist and columnist on the Sunday Times, the Sunday Telegraph, the Daily Telegraph, National Geographic Magazine and Granta, where he is a contributing editor. He is a Fellow of the Royal Society of Literature, the Society of Antiquaries and the Society of Antiquaries of Scotland.

He is noted for his books Sea Room (about the Shiant Isles, a group of uninhabited islands in the Hebrides); God's Secretaries: The Making of the King James Bible; The Mighty Dead (US title:Why Homer Matters) exploring the epic Greek poems; The Seabird's Cry about the disaster afflicting the world's seabirds; The Making of Poetry on the Romantic Revolution in England in the 1790s; and Life Between the Tides, a boundary-crossing account of the tides in human and animal life.

He has made several television series (with Keo Films) and radio series (with Tim Dee, the writer and radio producer) on a variety of subjects including the King James Bible, 17th-century literacy, Crete, Homer, the idea of Arcadia, the untold story of Britain's 20th-century whalers and the future of Atlantic seabirds.

Between 2005 and 2009, in partnership with the National Trust, Nicolson led a project which transformed the 260 acres (110 ha) surrounding the house and garden at Sissinghurst into a productive mixed farm, growing meat, fruit, cereals and vegetables for the National Trust restaurant. And between 2012 and 2017, together with the RSPB, the EU and SNH, Nicolson and his son Tom were partners in a project to eradicate invasive predators from the Shiant Isles, Outer Hebrides, Scotland. In March 2018, the islands were declared rat-free.

In December 2008 he succeeded his cousin David Nicolson, 4th Baron Carnock, as 5th Baron Carnock.

== Personal life ==
In 1982, Nicolson married Olivia Mary Rokeby Fane, daughter of daughter of Lt.-Cdr. Antony Charles Reynardson Fane, with whom he had three sons. In 1992, they divorced, and he married the writer and gardener, Sarah Raven with whom he has two daughters.

== Awards and recognition ==
- 1986 Somerset Maugham Award Frontiers
- 1987 PBFA Topography Prize (winner) Wetland (with Patrick Sutherland)
- 1997 British Press Awards Feature Writer of the Year (shortlist)
- 1998 British Book Awards Illustrated Book of the Year (shortlist) Restoration
- 2002 Duff Cooper Prize (shortlist) Sea Room
- 2004 Royal Society of Literature Heinemann Award (winner) Power and Glory
- 2005 Fellow of the Royal Society of Literature
- 2006 Royal United Services Institute Duke of Westminster's Medal for Military Literature (shortlist) Men of Honour
- 2009 Royal Society of Literature Ondaatje Prize (winner) Sissinghurst: An Unfinished History
- 2009 Samuel Johnson Prize (longlist) Sissinghurst: an Unfinished History
- 2010 Fellow of the Society of Antiquaries
- 2014 Samuel Johnson Prize (longlist) The Mighty Dead: Why Homer Matters
- 2014 Scottish BAFTA (winner, Factual Series) Britain's Whale Hunters
- 2015 London Hellenic Prize (shortlist) The Mighty Dead: Why Homer Matters
- 2017 Richard Jefferies Society Award for Nature Writing (winner) The Seabird's Cry
- 2018 Gomes Lecturer, Emmanuel College, Cambridge
- 2018 Wainwright Prize (winner) The Seabird's Cry
- 2019 Costa Biography Award (shortlist) The Making of Poetry
- 2021 Sunday Times Audible Short Story Award (longlist) The Fearful Summer
- 2022 Richard Jefferies Society Award for Nature Writing (shortlist) the sea is not made of water: Life between the Tides
- 2022 Wainwright Prize (longlist) the sea is not made of water: Life between the Tides
- 2024 Runciman Award (shortlist) How to Be: Life Lessons from the Early Greeks
- 2024 Pleasure of Reading Prize

== Books ==
- The National Trust Book of Long Walks (Weidenfeld & Nicolson, 1981)
- Long Walks in France (Weidenfeld & Nicolson, 1983)
- Frontiers (Weidenfeld & Nicolson, 1985)
- Wetland (Michael Joseph, 1987)
- Two Roads to Dodge City (Weidenfeld & Nicolson, 1988) with Nigel Nicolson
- Prospects of England: Two Thousand Years Seen Through Twelve English Towns (co-author with Peter Morter) (Weidenfeld & Nicolson, 1989)
- On Foot: Guided Walks in England, France, and the United States (Weidenfeld/Harmony, 1990)
- Restoration: Rebuilding of Windsor Castle (Michael Joseph, 1997)
- Regeneration: The Story of the Dome (HarperCollins, 1999)
- Perch Hill: A New Life (Constable, 2000)
- Mrs Kipling: The Hated Wife (Short Books, 2001)
- Sea Room (HarperCollins, 2001; Farrar, Straus & Giroux, 2002)
- Power and Glory: The Making of the King James Bible (US title: God's Secretaries) (HarperCollins, 2003) (2011 reissued in UK as When God Spoke English)
- Seamanship (HarperCollins, 2004)
- Men of Honour: Trafalgar and the Making of the English Hero (US title: Seize the Fire: Heroism, Duty, and the Battle of Trafalgar) (HarperCollins, 2005)
- Earls of Paradise (US title: Quarrel with the King) (HarperCollins, 2008)
- Sissinghurst: An Unfinished History (HarperCollins, 2008; US revised edition Viking, 2010)
- Arcadia: The Dream of Perfection in Renaissance England (a revised paperback edition of Earls of Paradise) (HarperCollins, 2009)
- About Eton (co-author with Eric Anderson) (Long Barn Books, 2010)
- The Smell of Summer Grass (an updated edition of Perch Hill) (HarperCollins, 2011)
- The Gentry: Stories of the English (HarperCollins, 2011)
- The Mighty Dead: Why Homer Matters (US title Henry Holt: Why Homer Matters) (HarperCollins, 2014)
- The Seabird's Cry: The Life and Loves of Puffins, Gannets and Other Ocean Voyagers (HarperCollins, 2017) (US Henry Holt: The Lives and Loves of the Planet's Great Ocean Voyagers (2018))
- The Making of Poetry: Coleridge, the Wordsworths and their Year of Marvels (HarperCollins, 2019; Farrar, Straus and Giroux, 2020)
- The Sea is Not Made of Water: Life Between the Tides (HarperCollins, 2021; Farrar, Straus and Giroux, Life Between the Tides 2022)
- How to Be: Life Lessons From the Early Greeks (HarperCollins, 2023; Farrar, Straus and Giroux)
- Bird School: a Beginner in the Wood (HarperCollins, 2025; Farrar, Straus and Giroux)

== Television ==
- Atlantic Britain Channel 4, 2004
- Sissinghurst BBC 4, 2009
- When God Spoke English: The Making of the King James Bible BBC 4, 2011
- The Century That Wrote Itself BBC 4, 2013
- Britain's Whale Hunters BBC 4, 2014
- The Last Seabird Summer? BBC 4, 2016

== Radio ==
- Homer's Landscapes 3 x 45 mins, BBC Radio 3, 2008
- A Cretan Spring 5 x 15 mins, with Sarah Raven, BBC Radio 3, 2009
- Dark Arcadias 2 x 45 mins, BBC Radio 3, 2011

Peerage of the United Kingdom
Preceded by David Nicolson	Baron Carnock; 2008–present	Incumbent; Heir apparent: Hon. Thomas Nicolson
