= Nicols =

Nicols is a surname. Notable people with the surname include:

- Audley Dean Nicols (1875–1941), American artist and illustrator
- Daniel Nicols (1833–1897), French-British restaurateur
- Henry Nicols (1973–2000), American HIV/AIDS activist
- Maggie Nicols (born 1948), Scottish vocalist and dancer
- Rosemary Nicols (born 1941), English actress
- Seann Nicols, American rock singer and songwriter
