= Donald Nicolson =

- Title: Reverend
- Theological work
- Tradition or movement: Episcopalian

The Reverend Donald Nicolson of Scorrybreac (died between 1698 and 1702) was an Episcopalian minister of Kilmuir in the Isle of Skye and head of the Clan MacNeacail, or MacNicol.

== Origins ==
The origins of Clan MacNeacail are mysterious. The traditional account (as relayed, for example, by the Rev. John Morison of Bragar in Lewis in about 1680) holds them to have been the ancient proprietors of Lewis, but they lost much of their power and prestige when the Macleods succeeded to the island by marriage to a MacNicol heiress. Hebridean tradition claims that this was a forced marriage, with the bride seized and the warriors of the Clan MacNicol attacked, with their vessels sunk by the MacLeods off the coast of the island. By 1450, however, the MacNicols were firmly established in the Trotternish peninsula in Skye, serving as members of the Council of the Lordship of the Isles. By the end of the eighteenth century, the clan would become distinguished by the large number of clergymen within its roll call, present in parishes across the Western Isles and northern Scotland, and the ecclesiastical tradition appears to have been laid down by their Medieval ancestors. The MacNicols were the principal benefactors of the Cathedral Church of St. Columba at Snizort on Skye, where tradition holds that one hundred leading men of the clan received burial.

== Life ==
Rev. Donald was the son of Malcolm MacNicol of Scorrybreac, tenth chief of the clan, and, according to family genealogies, the nephew of Sorley MacNicol of Drumuie, who had fought in the royalist armies of the Marquis of Montrose in the Civil War. He was brought up in the household of Sir James MacDonald of Sleat, as servitor to Sir James's son and heir. Donald graduated from Edinburgh University in 1659 (as recorded in the Catalogue of students in the faculties of the arts, divinity and law), and it is possible that it was his experience in the south of Scotland that prompted him to Anglicise the clan name as 'Nicolson'.

The number of the Reverend Donald's wives is uncertain, but he is generally credited with twenty-three children, through whom he is a common ancestor of many Skye families. He himself was a man of substantial means, appearing in the 1690s as a significant creditor of Macleod of Dunvegan. 'The Great Song of Scorrybreac', a Gaelic ballad composed in celebration of the marriage of Donald's son Malcolm to a daughter of MacLeod of Raasay records the affluence and splendour of the Nicolson household, and the success of the young men of the clan in 'wooing maidens' and 'winning wagers'.

In 1689, the settlement following the Glorious Revolution remodelled the Scottish Church in a Presbyterian form and required ministers to swear an oath of loyalty to the new king, William III. Those Episcopalian 'Non-Jurors' who refused were branded as Jacobites and ejected from their livings, and Skye tradition records Rev. Donald Nicolson as one of the most forthright among their number, being eventually driven from his parish in 1697. His son Malcolm, who concluded his studies at Edinburgh in 1689, had been originally intended for the church, but also refused to accept the new establishment, and never served as a minister. The close association of the Nicolsons of Scorrybreac with Skye's leading Jacobite families, the MacDonalds of Sleat and the MacLeods of Rassay, makes it altogether credible to count Donald and Malcolm among the ranks of the Non-Jurors.

== Descendants ==
On his death, the Reverend Donald was succeeded by his son Malcolm, who married Margaret Macleod of Raasay. A large number of his descendants (including at least two of his younger sons) entered the Church. These included two grandsons, Reverend Malcolm Nicolson of the parish of Kiltarlity, Inverness-shire, who served as a military chaplain with the Fraser Highlanders in the British capture of Quebec in 1759, and John Nicolson, minister of Portree for over forty-years before his death in 1796, whose pastoral devotion was long remembered in Skye, and whose character was warmly recorded in Thomas Pennant's journal of his 1769 tour of Scotland. Notable descendants of Rev. Donald outside the church include Alexander MacDonald of Kingsburgh, who masterminded the sheltering of the fugitive Young Pretender Charles Edward Stuart on Skye in 1746, and Major Malcolm Hassels Nicolson (1843–1904), a veteran of the British campaigns in India and Afghanistan, who was promoted to ADC to Queen Victoria, and married the poet Adela Florence Nicolson.
