= McNicol =

McNicol is a surname. It is a patronymic form of the personal name Nicol, which is a form of Nicholas. It comes from both German and Celtic origins. Notable people with the surname include:

- Archibald McNicol (1878–1933), New Zealand politician
- Bob McNicol (1933–1980), Scottish professional footballer
- David McNicol (diplomat) (1913–2001), Australian diplomat
- David McNicol (politician) (1833–1927), Scottish-born Canadian politician
- Duncan McNicol (1874–1949), Scottish footballer
- Evelyn McNicol (née Camrass; 1927–2021), Scottish explorer
- George Paul McNicol (1929–2014), Scottish physician and university academic
- Iain McNicol (born 1969), British politician and trade unionist
- Joey McNicol, Australian activist
- John McNicol (1863–1933), Scottish footballer
- Kate McNicol (born 1961), British rower
- Sam McNicol (born 1995), New Zealand rugby union player
- Sandy McNicol (15 June 1944–2017), New Zealand rugby union player

== See also ==
- McNicol Homestead, Clevedon, New Zealand
