= Clan MacNeacail =

Historical Scottish clan

Clan MacNeacail Clann MhicNeacail
- Crest: A hawk's head erased Gules.
- Motto: SGORR-A-BHREAC (Scorrybreac)
- Slogan: Meminisse sed providere (Remember but look ahead)

Profile
- District: Inner Hebrides
- Plant badge: Juniper

Chief
- John MacNeacail of MacNeacail and Scorrybreac
- Chief of the Highland Clan MacNeacail
- Seat: Ballina, New South Wales
- Historic seat: Scorrybreac Castle and Castle MacNicol (Stornoway Castle).
Septs of Clan MacNeacail
Clann MhicNeacail
MacNeacail(l), MacNecail(l), MacNicael(l), MacNichel(l), MacNichel(l), MacNichel(l), MacNichol(s), MacNicholas, MacNicholl(s), MacNickel(s), MacNickell(s), MacNickle(s), MacNickol(s), MacNickoll(s), MacNicol(s), MacNicoll(s), MacReacail, MacRickle, MakNychol(l), McNichol(s), McNicol, McNicoll, MhicNeacail, M’Nychol(l), M’Nychole, Neclasson, Necole(s), Necolson, Nicail(l), Niccol(s), Niccoll(s), Nichael, Nichel(s), Nichoal, Nicholai, Nichol(s), Nicholas(s), Nicholaisen, Nicholassen, Nicholay, Nichold(s), Nichole(s), Nicholl(s), Nicholson(e), Nicholsoun, Nickal(s), Nickall(s), Nickel(s), Nickell(s), Nickelson, Nickerson, Nickisson, Nicklas(s), Nickle(s), Nickold(s), Nickole(s), Nickol(s), Nickoll(s), Nickolson, Nickson, Niclasson, Nicol(s), Nicolaisen, Nicoll(s), Nicollsoun, Nicolson, Niklesson, Niochol(l), Nix(on), Nuccle(s), Nuccol, Nuckall, Nuckel(s), Nuckelson, Nuckle, Nuckoll, Nucolsone, Nychol(l), Nycholay(i), Nycholson, Nycholsoun, Nycol(s), Nycoll(s)
Allied clans
Clan Macdonald of Sleat
Clan Sutherland
Rival clans
Clan MacLeod of Lewis

Clan MacNeacail, sometimes known as Clan MacNicol, is a Scottish clan long associated with the Isle of Skye. Tradition states that, early in its history, the clan held the Isle of Lewis, as well as extensive territory on the north-western mainland. The earliest member of the clan on record is one 14th century John "mak Nakyl", who is recorded amongst Edward I of England's powerful West Highland supporters during the Wars of Scottish Independence. John Barbour's 1375 epic, The Brus, suggests that by 1316, the clan had switched allegiance to Robert I, and made a decisive intervention in the new theatre of Anglo-Scottish conflict in Ireland. The marriage of an heiress to the MacLeods of Lewis brought a severe loss of lands and power in the following generation, forcing the clan chiefs to relocate to the surviving estates on Skye. However, the MacNeacails retained local significant influence: serving, according to tradition, as members of the Council of the Lords of the Isles and as custodians of the cathedral church of the Western Isles at Snizort. In the 17th century, members of the clan began to Anglicise their surname from the Scottish Gaelic MacNeacail to various forms, such as Nicolson. Today the English variants of the Gaelic surname are borne by members of the clan as well as members of unrelated Scottish families, including the Lowland Clan Nicolson.

== Early history ==
=== Origins ===
The heartland of the clan has been for centuries in Trotternish, on Skye. The earliest record of a MacNeacail in Trotternish occurs in 1507. Hugh MacDonald's 17th century History of the MacDonalds shows that the clan was seated on Skye even earlier, as it states that "MacNicoll in Portree" was a member of the council of the Lords of the Isles. There are several pedigrees which document the earliest line of the clan. One such pedigree is contained within the 15th century MS 1467, and probably drawn up at the beginning of the fifteenth century. This pedigree concerns a certain John, son of Ewen, who is presented as the son of John, the son of Nicol. A previous 25 generations are set down, including one earlier Nicol, who - on a generational calculation - would have flourished in the later 12th century. This rollcall renders the pedigree one of the most substantial in the MS., and identifies the clan among the important followers of the Lords of the Isles - the document serving to detail those kindreds who upheld their authority. Although the credibility of the earlier parts of the pedigree is highly uncertain, the list mixes together Gaelic and Scandinavian names, and claims to take the male line of the MacNicols back to the Early Medieval Norse princes of Dublin. During the High Middle Ages, Skye formed a part of the Norse-Gaelic Kingdom of the Isles, before being incorporated into the Kingdom of Scotland through the Treaty of Perth in 1266. The MacNeacails were also one of the families whom the Irish genealogist John O'Hart purported to trace back to Adam and Eve via the early kings of Ireland. According to this genealogy, some of the ancestors of Clan MacNicol include Breoghan, the Celtic king of Spain; and Lugaid Mac Con, High King of Ireland. It is likely that the competing Norwegian and Celtic narratives of the clan's origins refer to two separate lines intertwined in a Norse-Gaelic marriage.

=== Earliest MacNeacail ===
The first MacNeacail on record is likely a 14th-century John "mak Nakyl" or "Macnakild". This man may well be the 'John son of Nicol' who appears in the MS 1467. John is recorded in three English documents which associate him with the leading West Highland supporters of Edward I of England during the Scottish Wars of Independence. One document records that, in 1306 letters were delivered from Edward to his supporters, William I, Earl of Ross, Lachlan MacRuairi, his brother Ruairi, and John "mak Nakyl". In 1314 and 1315, Edward II of England, ordered his principle West Highland supporter John MacDougall of Argyll to receive Donald de Insula, his brother Godfrey (both likely MacDonalds), Sir Patrick Graham, and John "Macnakild" into the king's peace. The three records suggest that John was a prominent West Highland or Hebridean leader, much like the other men the records associate him with. It is also possible that John may be identical to the unnamed MacNicol who appears in John Barbour's late 14th century poem The Brus. The part of the poem which mentions this MacNicol recounts how he took part in Edward Bruce's siege of Carrickfergus Castle in 1316. As the poem associated this MacNicol with ships, it may be further evidence that John was a leading Hebridean.

=== Tradition ===
By the early sixteenth century, the MacNeacails are on documentary record as a small, though locally-influential clan, concentrated in Trotternish on Skye. However, long-standing Gaelic tradition, backed up by the evidence of place names and the MS. 1467, suggests that their power had once been much greater - extending through the thirteenth century over a great part of the northern Hebrides and the north-western mainland. William Matheson has posited the MacNicols as ‘the leading family in the Outer Hebrides towards the end of the Norse period’. The central feature of this tradition is the claim that the MacNeacails once had possession of Lewis before losing their lands to the MacLeods through the marriage of an heiress. The MacNicols are believed to have held 'Castle Sween' at Stornoway for three centuries before the MacLeods, and to have consolidated their power with the construction of Caisteal Mhic Creacail, at Point, on the same island (Creacail being the old Gaelic pronunciation of 'Nicol'). The garbled Bannatyne Manuscript indicates that the MacNeacails held Lewis from the Kings of Mann, and that the clan's possession of the island terminated though the marriage of an heiress to a MacLeod. The manuscript also states that a branch of the MacNeacails held Waternish on Skye before the MacLeods. The purported match of Margaret MacNicol to Murdoch, son of Leod (or according to some accounts, Murdoch's offspring Torquil), would have happened some time shortly before 1343, when the MacLeods of Lewis were confirmed in their landholdings by virtue of a royal grant. The memory of the marriage was surrounded for several centuries by dark rumours. In the 17th century, John Morison of Bragar wrote of "... Macknaicle whose onlie daughter Torquill the first of that name (and sone to Claudius the sone of Olipheous, who likewise is said to be the King of Noruway his sone,) did violentlie espouse, and cutt off Immediatlie the whole race of Macknaicle and possessed himself with the whole Lews ...". Other traditions associate the MacNeacails with the mainland in Assynt and Coigach; the ruins of Caisteal Mhic Neacail ("MacNeacail's Castle") near Ullapool may well corroborate these links. Producing a description of Assynt to accompany the Statistical Account of 1794, Rev William Mackenzie drew upon a local tradition that the district had been granted by the Thane of Sutherland to one 'MacKrycul', in recognition of his service against Viking cattle-raiders. The local belief that MacKrycul was the 'potent man' from whom the MacNicols descended is seemingly backed up by the MS. 1467, in which the first of the two Nicails - living approximately in the later twelfth century - is listed as the son of 'Gregall'. By the middle of the fourteenth century, this district was also under the control of the MacLeods.

The History of the MacDonalds may well refer to a member of the clan, when it states that a "MacNicoll" was killed on North Uist in a rebellion against Olaf the Red. Olaf ruled the Kingdom of the Isles until his death in 1153. Since the reference to MacNicoll appears after an account of Godfrey Donn, during an episode which took place in about 1223, the story of MacNicoll's death may actually refer to Olaf the Black, rather than his grandfather Olaf the Red. If the earlier Nicol in the MS. 1467 can be considered the name-father of the clan, the slaughtered chieftain could tentatively be identified as his son Neaill. If it was indeed the case that the MacNicols of Coigach were granted Assynt and surrounding territories for action against Norse raiders, these two events together indicate the slow loosening of the clan's Scandinavian allegiances, as the kings of Scotland began to exert their claims over the Western Isles. Another tradition which may refer to the MacNeacails concerns the coat of arms of the MacLeods of Lewis. In the 17th century, the Earl of Cromartie recounted the traditional explanation of the arms: that the Kings of Norway had the MacLeods man two beacons, one on Lewis and one on Skye, to guide the king's ships safely through the islands. Since the MacLeods appear to have gained Lewis long after the Hebrides was incorporated into the Kingdom of Scotland, the tradition may well refer instead to the MacNeacails. If this is the case, then the MacLeods of Lewis not only inherited their lands from the MacNeacails, but also aspects of their heraldry.

Put together, these stray accounts and traditions bolster the impression of the MacNicols as a significant political and territorial force in the Medieval north-west, who experienced a traumatic loss of status in the fourteenth century that disrupted the balance of power across the region. This interpretation is supported, as David Sellar has shown, by two details in the early history of the MacLeods of Lewis. A MacLeod pedigree, now in the collection of the Royal Irish Academy, appropriates the MacNicol family tree of 1467, running without a break into the familiar rollcall of early Medieval names. Secondly, the royal grant of Assynt to the MacLeods of Lewis in 1343 included the pointed stipulation that inheritance would pass down the line of heirs male. As Sellar puts it, 'the MacLeods had no intention of seeing their newly gained lands leave the clan through an heiress!' The MS. 1467 can credibly be considered in the light of these events, in view of the surprising omission of the MacLeods from a document conceived to demonstrate the power of the Lords of the Isles and their allied families. With the MacNicols serving as councillors under the lordship, Ronald Black has suggested that the MS. 1467 aimed to assert their continuing claims over lost territories: placing John, the chief of the family, in lineal descent from the royal Norse line and the earlier possessors of Lewis. If this interpretation is followed, John's father, Ewen MacNicol, could speculatively be positioned as a brother of the heiress - either illegitimate or too young to prevent the forcible transfer of his ancestral territories into other hands.

== History of the clan ==
=== 16th to 19th centuries ===
By the sixteenth century, the MacNicol chiefs were based at Scorrybreac House on Skye, reputed to have been gifted by the Scottish crown originally in 1263, in recognition of service at the Battle of Largs. In 1540, the household hosted James V, on his venture to assert authority over the Hebridean chiefs. The event is proudly memorialised in old MacNicol songs. Elsewhere on Skye, the MacNicols were principal patrons of the cathedral church of St Columba on the River Snizort. Twenty-eight chiefs of the clan are believed to lie buried within its grounds, and a small chapel bears the name MacNicol's Aisle in honour of their generosity as benefactors. After the dissolution of the Lordship of the Isles, the clan followed the MacDonalds of Sleat. Malcolmuill MacNicol and his brother Nicoll took part in the feud between the MacDonalds and Macleans: both being pardoned for acts of 'fire-raising and homicide' on Mull in 1563. During the Scottish Civil War of the 17th century the MacNeacails again fought alongside the house of Sleat. Sorley MacNicol was listed as one of the 'friends and followers' who had supported Sir James MacDonald in raising his clan for the service of Charles I and the Marquis of Montrose.

The Reverend Donald Nicolson of Scorrybreac, head of the clan at the end of the 17th century, is reputed to have had 23 children, through whom he is a common ancestor of many Skye families. Donald's attachment to the Episcopalian faith, and refusal to swear allegiance to William III after 1689 seems to have resulted in his being driven from his parish as a Non-juror - the religious position strongly aligned with Jacobitism - some time after 1696. The MacDonalds of Sleat fought in the Jacobite risings of 1689 and 1715, and it is probable that Nicolsons served within their ranks: an intelligence report gathered for the government in 1745 identified John Nicolson of Scorrybreck as one of Skye's likely rebels, should the MacDonalds again take to the field. In the event, the Sleat MacDonalds avoided action in the 1745 rebellion, but tradition maintains that a band of Nicolsons fought at Culloden in Jacobite service. Outside Skye, Alexander Mackenzie, in his history of Clan Mackenzie, claims that Angus Nicolson of Stornoway raised 300 men from the Isle of Lewis for Jacobite service, only to be ordered back by a furious Earl of Seaforth when they landed on the mainland.

A number of Nicolsons were involved in the covert activity that surrounded the sheltering of the fugitive Prince Charles Edward in the Hebrides after Culloden. As a cousin of the intensely Jacobite MacLeods of Rassay, the chief, John Nicolson, appears to have assisted in the concealment of the prince in a cow byre on his estates: John's descendants preserved a lock of the prince's hair, and the cup out of which he drank on his night on Scorrybreac lands. Margaret Nicolson, granddaughter of Reverend Donald, and wife to John MacDonald of Kirkibost, North Uist, crossed the Minch to Skye to inform the prince's supporters of his imminent arrival in the company of Flora MacDonald. Another man of the clan, Donald Nicolson from Raasay, also helped to protect the Young Pretender during his flight, and was recorded by Bishop Robert Forbes in The Lyon in Mourning as suffering torture for his refusal to reveal the whereabouts of the prince after arrest by government troops. Donald Nicolson's descendants emigrated to Australia, and recorded the memory of his service as one of the prince's guides in their family Bible. The Skye poet Sorley Maclean noted a family tradition that his maternal ancestor Eóghan (Ewen) Nicolson 'was evicted from good land that he held... near Portree for his part in helping in the escape of Prince Charles'.

During the 19th century the clan was badly affected by the Highland Clearances in which many of the clansfolk were forced to emigrate from Scotland. In 1826, the sons of chief left Skye and settled in Tasmania.

=== 20th century ===
In 1934, Norman Alexander Nicolson, heir to the chiefship of the clan, was granted a coat of arms by the Lord Lyon King of Arms emblazoned Or, a chevron between three hawks' heads erased Gules, with the crest: a hawk's head erased Gules, with the mottoes: SGORR-A-BHREAC and GENEROSITATE NON FEROCITATE. In 1980, Norman Alexander's son, Ian, petitioned the Lord Lyon to be recognised as chief of the clan, and was duly recognised as "Iain MacNeacail of MacNeacail and Scorrybreac, Chief of The Highland Clan MacNeacail". The current clan chief is John MacNeacail of MacNeacail and Scorrybreac, who resides in Ballina, NSW, Australia. In 1987, The Clan MacNeacail Trust was formed, and the Ben Chracaig estate in Scorrybreac was purchased "for preservation and public enjoyment".

== Traditions concerning the clan ==
On Lewis the ravine separating Dùn Othail from the mainland is called "Leum Mhac Nicol", which translates from Scottish Gaelic as "Nicolson's Leap". Legend was that a MacNeacail, for a certain crime, was sentenced by the chief of Lewis to be castrated. In revenge he ran off with the chief's only child to the ravine and leaped across the chasm. MacNeacail threatened to throw the child into the sea unless the chief himself agreed to be mutilated as well. Attempts at rescuing the child failed and the chief finally agreed to the man's terms. Just as the chief consented MacNeacail leaped over the cliff and into the sea with the child crying out in Gaelic. "I shall have no heir, and he shall have no heir".

A tradition from Skye is that a chief of the MacNicol clan, MacNicol Mor, was engaged in a heated discussion with Macleod of Raasay. As the two argued in English a servant, who could speak only Gaelic, imagined that the two leaders were quarrelling. The servant, thinking his master in danger, then drew his sword and slew MacNicol Mor. To prevent a feud between the two septs, the clan elders and chiefs of the two septs then held council to decide how to appease the MacNicols. The decision agreed upon was that the "meanest" of Clan Nicol would behead Macleod of Raasay. Lomach, a lowly maker of pannier baskets, was chosen and accordingly cut off the head of the Laird of Raasay.

== Clan Castles ==
- Castle MacNicol which is also known as Stornoway Castle is under the pier in Stornoway harbour on the Isle of Lewis. It was the original stronghold of the Clan MacNicol (MacNeacail) until the island passed by marriage to the MacLeods in the fourteenth century. Although some stories have a Viking named Leod seizing the castle from the MacNicols. The castle had an eventful history until it was destroyed by Oliver Cromwell's forces in the middle of the seventeenth century.
- Scorrybreac Castle on the Isle of Skye was for centuries the seat of the MacNicols and may have been given to them for fighting at the Battle of Largs in 1263. James V of Scotland is believed to have spent a night at Scorrybreac in 1540. The chief sold these lands to the MacDonalds in the nineteenth century.

== Clan profile ==
=== Symbols ===
Today members of Clan MacNeacail may show allegiance to their clan and chief by wearing a Scottish crest badge. This badge contains the chief's heraldic crest and heraldic motto. The motto which appears on the crest badge is SGORR-A-BHREAC, which refers to the ancestral lands of the clan chiefs. The crest itself is a hawk's head erased Gules. The heraldic elements with the crest badge are derived from the Arms of MacNeacail of MacNeacail and Scorrybreac, the chief of the clan. The arms of the chiefs of the clans MacNeacail and Nicolson are in fact very similar: the arms of the MacNeacail chief are subordinate to those borne by the Nicolson chief. According to Robert Bain, Clan MacNeacail's clan badge is a trailing azalea.

=== Tartan ===
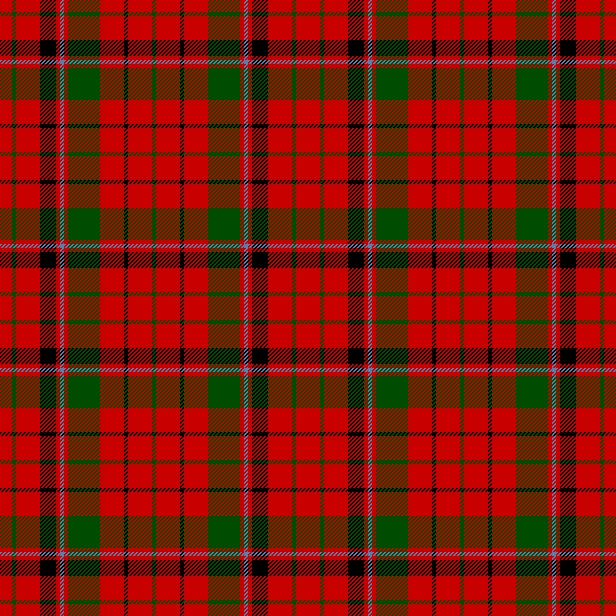
MacNicol/Nicolson tartan. The historian James Logan, who travelled the Scottish Highlands collecting tartan in the early nineteenth century admitted he could not find an authentic MacNicol/Nicolson tartan.

The MacNicol/Nicolson tartan that appears in the 1845 work The Clans of the Scottish Highlands, by James Logan and illustrated by R. R. McIan, represents a woman wearing a tartan shawl. Logan even admitted they had never encountered a tartan for the MacNicols/Nicolsons, and that "it is probable they adopted that of their superiors" - the MacLeods.

=== Origin of the name ===
Today many members of Clan MacNeacail bear the surname Nicolson (and variations). This is because in the late 17th century members of the clan began to Anglicise their Gaelic name (Modern Scottish Gaelic: MacNeacail) to Nicolson. The surname Nicolson means "son of Nicol". The personal name Nicol is a diminutive of Nicholas, derived from the Greek Νικόλαος meaning "victory people". The personal name Nicol was first brought to the British Isles by the Normans. Nicholas was a very common mediaeval name and is found in many different forms as a surname.

== Like-named families and clans ==
Many families who bear same surname as the clan do not have any historical connection to the clan. For example, according to tradition the MacNicols from Argyll are thought to descend from a 16th-century Macfie. The MacNicols from Angus cannot be connected to any other like-named family, but it is possible they are related to Nicolls of Kinclune, in Angus. Some of the MacNicols on Lewis may well be related to Clan MacNeacail, but others were originally MacRitchies. A Nicolson family has been recorded in Caithness since the 17th century. The Nicols of Ballogie claimed in the early 20th century to descend from Clan MacNeacail; the family claimed to have been pushed south by the Mackintoshes. Although there is no record of any such conflict, clan histories of the Mackintoshes record a certain "Clan Nicol vic Olan" as one of their followers (this clan, however, is not heard of after the late 15th century). One Nicolson family of the name in Shetland derive their surname from a 17th-century man, while another family is related to the Nicolsons from Aberdeen and Edinburgh. The Nicolsons of Cluny, Kemnay, and Glenbervie are also descended from the Nicolsons from Aberdeen and Edinburgh. The latter family, also known as Clan Nicolson, is the main Lowland family of the name. This family can be traced to the mid 15th century in Aberdeen, and has been represented in recent years by Nicolson of that Ilk. The family has no known connection to Clan MacNeacail.

== Bibliography ==
- Bain, Robert (1983). MacDougall, Margaret O (ed.). The Clans and Tartans of Scotland. Heraldic advisor Stewart-Blacker, P. E. Glasgow: Collins. ISBN 0-00-411117-6.
- Black, George Fraser (1946). The Surnames of Scotland : Their Origin, Meaning and History. New York: New York Public Library. ISBN 0-87104-172-3.
- Maclauchlan, Thomas; Wilson, John (1875). Keltie, John Scott (ed.). A History of the Scottish Highlands, Highland Clans and Highland Regiments. Vol. 2. Edinburgh: A. Fullarton & Co.
- Reaney, Percy Hilde; Wilson, Richard Middlewood (2006). A Dictionary of English Surnames (3rd ed.). London: Routledge. ISBN 0-203-99355-1.
- Scottish History Society (1907). Publications of the Scottish History Society. Vol. 52. Edinburgh: Scottish History Society. ISBN 0-7803-4233-X.
- Sellar, William David Hamilton; Maclean, Alasdair (1999). The Highland clan MacNeacail (MacNicol): a history of the Nicolsons of Scorrybreac. Maclean Press. ISBN 1-899272-02-X.
- Stewart, Donald Calder (1974). The Setts of the Scottish Tartans, with descriptive and historical notes (2nd revised ed.). London: Shepheard-Walwyn. ISBN 0-85683-011-9.
- Thomas, F.W.L. (1890). "On the Duns of the Outer Hebrides" (PDF). Archaeologia Scotica: Transactions of the Society of Antiquaries of Scotland. 5. Society of Antiquaries of Scotland. Archived from the original (PDF) on 18 March 2009.
- Way of Plean, George; Squire, Romilly (2000). Clans & Tartans. Glasgow: HarperCollins. ISBN 0-00-472501-8.
