= Nigel Nicolson =

British politician and writer

Nigel Nicolson OBE

Member of Parliament for Bournemouth East and Christchurch
- In office 1952–1959
- Preceded by: Brendan Bracken
- Succeeded by: John Cordle

Personal details
- Born: 19 January 1917 183 Ebury Street, Westminster, London, England
- Died: 23 September 2004 (aged 87) Sissinghurst Castle, Kent, England
- Party: Conservative
- Spouse: Philippa Tennyson-d'Eyncourt (m. 1953; div. 1970)
- Children: Juliet Nicolson, Adam Nicolson and Rebecca Nicolson
- Parent(s): Harold Nicolson; Vita Sackville-West

Nigel Nicolson OBE (19 January 1917 – 23 September 2004) was an English writer, publisher and politician.

== Early life and education ==
Nicolson was the second son of writers Sir Harold Nicolson and Vita Sackville-West; he had an elder brother Ben, an art historian. The boys grew up in Kent, first at Long Barn, near their mother's ancestral home at Knole, and then at Sissinghurst Castle, where their parents created a famous garden. Nicolson was sent to board at Summer Fields, a prep school in Oxford; he then attended Eton College and Balliol College, Oxford.

During World War II, he served with the Grenadier Guards, later writing their official history.

== Career ==
Nicolson wrote many books. He and George Weidenfeld co-founded the publishing house Weidenfeld & Nicolson, of which he was a director from 1948 to 1992. He also worked as a broadcaster and was a member of the Ancient Monuments Board. Although his father had been first a National Labour and then a Labour politician, Nigel Nicolson became active in the Conservative Party and contested Leicester North West in 1950 and Falmouth and Camborne in 1951, without success. He was elected Member of Parliament for Bournemouth East and Christchurch at a by-election in February 1952, when the previous MP, Brendan Bracken, was elevated to the House of Lords. Nicolson was re-elected in the seat in the general election of May 1955.

However, he was uncomfortable within the Conservatives and voted with Labour to abolish hanging and abstained in a motion of no confidence in the government over the Suez Crisis. His constituency association called for him to resign and wrote to the Prime Minister to brief against the MP. A ballot of members was called. A controversy relating to his publishing interests broke a few years later, the company's decision to publish the British edition of Vladimir Nabokov's novel Lolita in 1959. Nicolson lost the members' vote and was forced to step down at the general election of October 1959.

Nicolson returned to writing, particularly on heritage and biography. He co-wrote a celebrated 1973 book on his parents, Portrait of a Marriage. It balanced a frank account of his bisexual parents' extramarital affairs (especially Vita Sackville-West's 'elopement' with Violet Trefusis) with their enduring love for each other and caused an uproar when it was published. He edited his father's diaries and, with Joanne Trautmann, the letters of Virginia Woolf. Later, he wrote the "Long Life" column for The Spectator, and a Time of My Life column for The Sunday Telegraph. His autobiography, Long Life, was published in 1997.

== Personal life ==
In 1953, Nicolson married Philippa, the daughter of Sir Gervais Tennyson d'Eyncourt, and they had two daughters, Rebecca, a publisher, and Juliet, a historian, and a son, Adam, a writer. Juliet has written about her father and his ancestors in A House Full of Daughters (2016). Adam has revived the home farm at Sissinghurst. Nigel and Philippa divorced in 1970.

== Death ==
Nicolson died on 23 September 2004, at Sissinghurst Castle, in Kent.

== Ancestors ==
Ancestors of Nigel Nicolson

16. Maj.-Gen. Sir William Nicolson, 9th Baronet, of Carnock
8. Adm. Sir Frederick Nicolson, 10th Baronet, of Carnock
17. Mary Russell
4. Arthur Nicolson, 1st Baron Carnock
18. James Loch
9. Mary Loch
19. Ann Orr
2. The Hon. Sir Harold Nicolson
20. Cap. Gawin William Rowan-Hamilton
10. Cap. Archibald Rowan-Hamilton
21. Catherine Cockburn
5. Mary Katherine Rowan-Hamilton
22. Rev. George Caldwell
11. Catherine Anne Caldwell
23. Harriet Abdy
1. Nigel Nicolson
24. George Sackville-West, 5th Earl De La Warr
12. The. Hon. William Edward Sackville-West
25. Lady Elizabeth Sackville, 1st Baroness Buckhurst
6. Lionel Sackville-West, 3rd Baron Sackville
26. George Dodwell
13. Georgina Dodwell
27. Victoria Gethin
3. The Hon. Vita Sackville-West
28. George Sackville-West, 5th Earl De La Warr (= 24)
14. Lionel Sackville-West, 2nd Baron Sackville
29. Lady Elizabeth Sackville, 1st Baroness Buckhurst (= 25)
7. Victoria Sackville-West
30. Pedro Durán
15. Josefa Durán y Ortega
31. Catalina Ortega

== Bibliography ==
- The Grenadier Guards in the War of 1939–1945 (Gale & Polden, 1949) with Patrick Forbes
- Lord of the Isles: Lord Leverhulme in the Hebrides (Weidenfeld & Nicolson, 1960)
- People and Parliament (Weidenfeld & Nicolson, 1958)
- The United Nations: A Reply to Its Critics (1963)
- Sissinghurst Castle: An Illustrated History (Headley Bros, 1964)
- Great Houses of Britain (Weidenfeld & Nicolson, 1965)
- Diaries & Letters of Harold Nicolson (Collins, 1966–68) three volumes, editor
- Great Houses of The Western World (G. P. Putnam and Sons, 1968)
- Alex: The Life of Field Marshal Earl Alexander of Tunis (Weidenfeld & Nicolson, 1973)
- Portrait of a Marriage (Weidenfeld and Nicolson, 1973)
- Letters of Virginia Woolf (The Hogarth Press, 1975–1980) six volumes, editor
- The Himalayas (Time-Life Books, 1975)(The World's Wild Places)
- Mary Curzon (Weidenfeld & Nicolson, 1977)
- The National Trust for Places of Historic Interest or Natural Beauty National Trust Book of Great Houses in Britain (David R Godinez, 1978)
- Napoleon 1812 (Weidenfeld and Nicolson, 1985)
- Lady Curzon's India: Letters of a Vicereine (Weidenfeld & Nicolson, 1985)
- Two Roads to Dodge City (Weidenfeld & Nicolson, 1986) with Adam Nicolson
- The Village in History (Weidenfeld & Nicolson, 1988) with Graham Nicholson and Jane Fawcett
- Counties of Britain: A Tudor Atlas by John Speed (Pavilion Books, 1988) with Alasdair Hawkyard
- Kent (Weidenfeld & Nicolson, 1988)
- The World of Jane Austen (Weidenfeld & Nicolson, 1991)
- Vita and Harold : The Letters of Vita Sackville-West and Harold Nicolson (G. P. Putnam's Sons, 1992) editor
- Long Life: Memoirs (Weidenfeld & Nicolson, 1997)
- Virginia Woolf (Weidenfeld & Nicolson, 2000) (Lives series)
- Fanny Burney: The Mother of English Fiction (Short Books, 2002)
- Vita Sackville-West : Selected Writings (Palgrave Macmillan, 2002) editor with Mary Ann Caws
- The Queen and Us: The Second Elizabethan Age (Weidenfeld & Nicolson, 2003)

== See also ==
- List of Bloomsbury Group people

Parliament of the United Kingdom
Preceded by Brendan Bracken	Member of Parliament for Bournemouth East and Christchurch; 1952–1959	Succeeded by John Cordle
