= Sir John Nicolson, 2nd Baronet =

Sir John Nicolson, 2nd Baronet, of Lasswade was a shire commissioner of the Parliament of Scotland.

== Biography ==
Nicolson was the son of John Nicolson of Pilton, who died in 1648. In May 1651 he succeeded his grandfather Sir John Nicolson, 1st Baronet, in the baronetcy and the estate of Lasswade. He was shire commissioner for Edinburghshire from 1672 to 1674. His wife was Elizabeth, daughter of William Dick of Braid. Their sons included Sir John Nicolson, 3rd Baronet and Sir William Nicolson, 4th Baronet.

Baronetage of Nova Scotia
Preceded by John Nicolson	Baronet (of that Ilk and of Lasswade); 1651–c. 1680	Succeeded by John Nicolson
