= McNicholl =

McNicholl is a surname. Notable people with the surname include:

- Brian McNicholl (born 1951), New Zealand Paralympic athlete
- Dermot McNicholl (born 1965), Irish Gaelic footballer
- John McNicholl, Northern Irish country singer
- Johnny McNicholl (born 1990), New Zealand rugby union player
- Ken McNicholl (1930–1997), New Zealand cricketer
