= David Nicolson, 4th Baron Carnock =

British peer (1920–2008)

David Henry Arthur Nicolson, 4th Baron Carnock (10 July 1920 – 26 December 2008) was a British peer and solicitor.

The son of the 3rd Baron Carnock and Hon. Katharine Lopes, daughter of Henry Lopes, 1st Baron Roborough, he was educated at Winchester College and Balliol College, Oxford. Nicolson served in the Royal Devon Yeomanry, reaching the rank of major and fought in the Second World War. From 1955 to 1986, he was a partner in Clifford Turner. On 2 October 1982, he succeeded to his father's titles and became Chief of Clan Nicolson. Two years later the dormant Baronetcy, of Lasswade in the County of Midlothian was revived in his favour. He was succeeded by his cousin, the writer Adam Nicolson.

Peerage of the United Kingdom
Preceded by Erskine Nicolson	Baron Carnock; 1982–2008	Succeeded by Adam Nicolson
Baronetage of Nova Scotia
Preceded by Dormant	Baronet (of Lasswade); 1984–2008	Succeeded by Adam Nicolson
Preceded by Erskine Nicolson	Baronet (of Carnock); 1982–2008	Succeeded by Adam Nicolson
