= Helen Nicolson =

Child and family psychiatrist (1924–2021)

- Born: Helen Mathewson; 1924; India
- Died: 2021 (aged 97); Perth, Scotland
- Education: University of St Andrews; University of Manchester; Newcastle University
- Occupation: Child psychiatrist
- Known for: Child and family psychodynamic approach, Quakerism
- Spouse: Tom Nicolson (m. 1967; died 2005)

Helen Nicolson (1924–2021), born Helen Mathewson, was a founding psychiatrist consultant of the innovative Dundee department of child and family psychiatry (1965–1980s). She applied a psychodynamic approach and led a multidisciplinary team in understanding family dynamics, child behaviour and using different theoretical approaches, and taught her empathetic approach to many doctors.

== Life ==
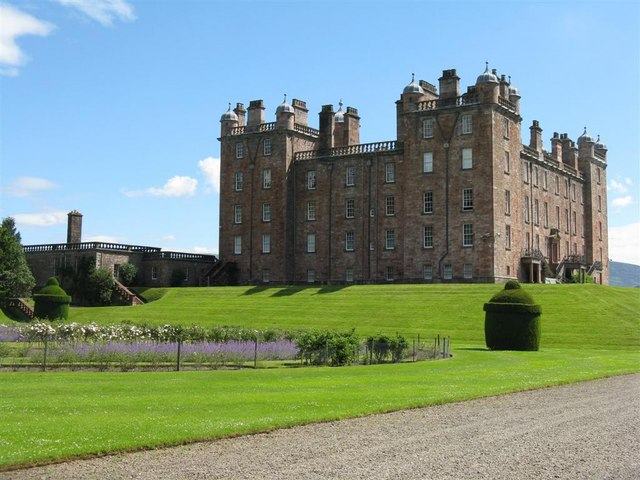
Drumlanrig Castle, where Nicolson's school was evacuated

Nicolson was born Helen Mathewson, in India, to a missionary couple, William Mathewson, an eye surgeon and Gwendoline (nee Barbour), who had been influenced by Quakers. They lived near the Himalayas but she was sent, at age 10, to be educated in the UK, for a year staying with family in Manchester. Her parents returned to Edinburgh and she was sent to St. Denis School which relocated to Drumlanrig in Dumfriesshire, during the Second World War; Nicolson became head girl.

She then studied medicine (graduating in 1948) studying at St. Andrews University and Manchester and Newcastle, where she became involved later in what was a new discipline of child psychiatry, under Quaker Professor Donald Court.

Her own career involved founding a child and family psychiatry department in Dundee, after taking a psychotherapy course in Aberdeen. Nicolson's innovative service grew to expand across the area, from 1965 to her retirement in the 1980s, to having several clinical and community units in Dundee and Perth, including the first adolescent in-patient service.

Nicolson was remembered for training other doctors in using a psychodynamic approach, and was remembered for her empathy to children and family members as well as clinical skill, and her wide knowledge and excellent recall. She had an 'unshaken belief in the worth of children' and had upheld the view that ' to love a person is to perceive their needs and be able to meet them.'

== Personal life ==
Nicolson married later in life, in 1967, Tom Nicolson, a botanist, and became stepmother to his two children. When she retired in the 1980s, they moved to his native Shetland, where she lived until his death in 2005. She returned to Perth and became a Quaker, which she said related to her mother's interest in Quakerism in her early life; other sources put her interest down to the influence of Professor Court. It was reported that she told an East of Scotland meeting, that her early childhood 'in a country where everyone had a religion' was something she regarded as 'fortunate' in seeing religious practices intertwined with everyday life, and in her later school years church was part of the weekly routines.
