= Nicolson baronets =

Baronetcy in the Baronetage of Nova Scotia

The Nicolson baronets refer to one of four baronetcies created for persons with the surname Nicolson, all in the Baronetage of Nova Scotia. Two of the creations remain extant as of 2008.

The Nicolson Baronetcy, of Cockburnspath, in Berwickshire, was created in the Baronetage of Nova Scotia on 17 December 1625 for James Nicolson. Nothing further is known of the title.

The Nicolson Baronetcy, of that Ilk and of Lasswade, in the County of Midlothian, was created in the Baronetage of Nova Scotia on 27 July 1629 for John Nicolson, with remainder to his heirs male whatsoever. On the death of the seventh Baronet in 1743 the baronetcy became dormant. Arthur Nicolson, de jure eighth Baronet, was the great-grandson of James Nicolson, Bishop of Dunkeld, brother of the first Baronet. In 1826 Arthur's grandson, Arthur Nicolson, was served heir of the seventh Baronet and became the eighth Baronet. The eleventh Baronet was Lord-Lieutenant of Shetland. The baronetcy once again became dormant on the death of the twelfth Baronet in 1961. In 1984 David Nicolson, 4th Baron Carnock, was recognised in the title and became the thirteenth Baronet. See Baron Carnock for more information.

The Nicolson Baronetcy, of Carnock, in the County of Stirling, was created in the Baronetage of Nova Scotia on 16 January 1637. For more information on this creation, see Baron Carnock.

The Nicolson Baronetcy, of Glenbervie, in the County of Kincardine, was created in the Baronetage of Nova Scotia on 15 April 1700 for Thomas Nicolson. The title is thought to have become dormant on the death of the fifth Baronet, Sir Joseph Nicolson, son of Sir James Nicolson and Margaret Wharton, in circa 1839. Recent research suggests that it may have passed to relations in Europe.

== Nicolson baronets, of Cockburnspath (1625) ==
- Sir James Nicolson, 1st Baronet (c. 1590–1656)

== Nicolson baronets, of that Ilk and of Lasswade (1629) ==
- Sir John Nicolson, 1st Baronet (died 1651)
- Sir John Nicolson, 2nd Baronet (died c. 1680)
- Sir John Nicolson, 3rd Baronet (died 1681)
- Sir William Nicolson, 4th Baronet (died 1687)
- Sir John Nicolson, 5th Baronet (died 1689)
- Sir Thomas Nicolson, 6th Baronet (died 1693)
- Sir James Nicolson, 7th Baronet (died 1743)
- Sir Arthur Nicolson, 8th Baronet (1794–1863)
- Sir Arthur Bolt Nicolson, 9th Baronet (1811–1879)
- Sir Arthur Thomas Bennett Robert Nicolson, 10th Baronet (1842–1917)
- Sir Arthur John Frederick William Nicolson, 11th Baronet (1882–1952)
- Sir Harold Stanley Nicolson, 12th Baronet (1883–1961)
- David Henry Arthur Nicolson, 4th Baron Carnock, 13th Baronet (1920–2008)
- Adam Nicolson, 5th Baron Carnock, 14th Baronet (born 1957)

The heir apparent is the present holder's son Hon. Thomas Nicolson (born 1984).

== Nicolson baronets, of Carnock (1637) ==
- see Baron Carnock

== Nicolson baronets of Glenbervie (1700) ==
- Sir Thomas Nicolson, 1st Baronet (c. 1664–1728)
- Sir William Nicolson, 2nd Baronet (c. 1673–1766)
- Sir James Nicolson, 3rd Baronet (1722–1782)
- Sir James Nicolson, 4th Baronet (died c. 1810)
- Sir Joseph Nicolson, 5th Baronet (1800–c.1839)
