= Arthur Nicolson, 1st Baron Carnock =

British diplomat and politician (1849–1928)

The Right Honourable The Lord Carnock GCB, GCMG, GCVO, KCIE PC
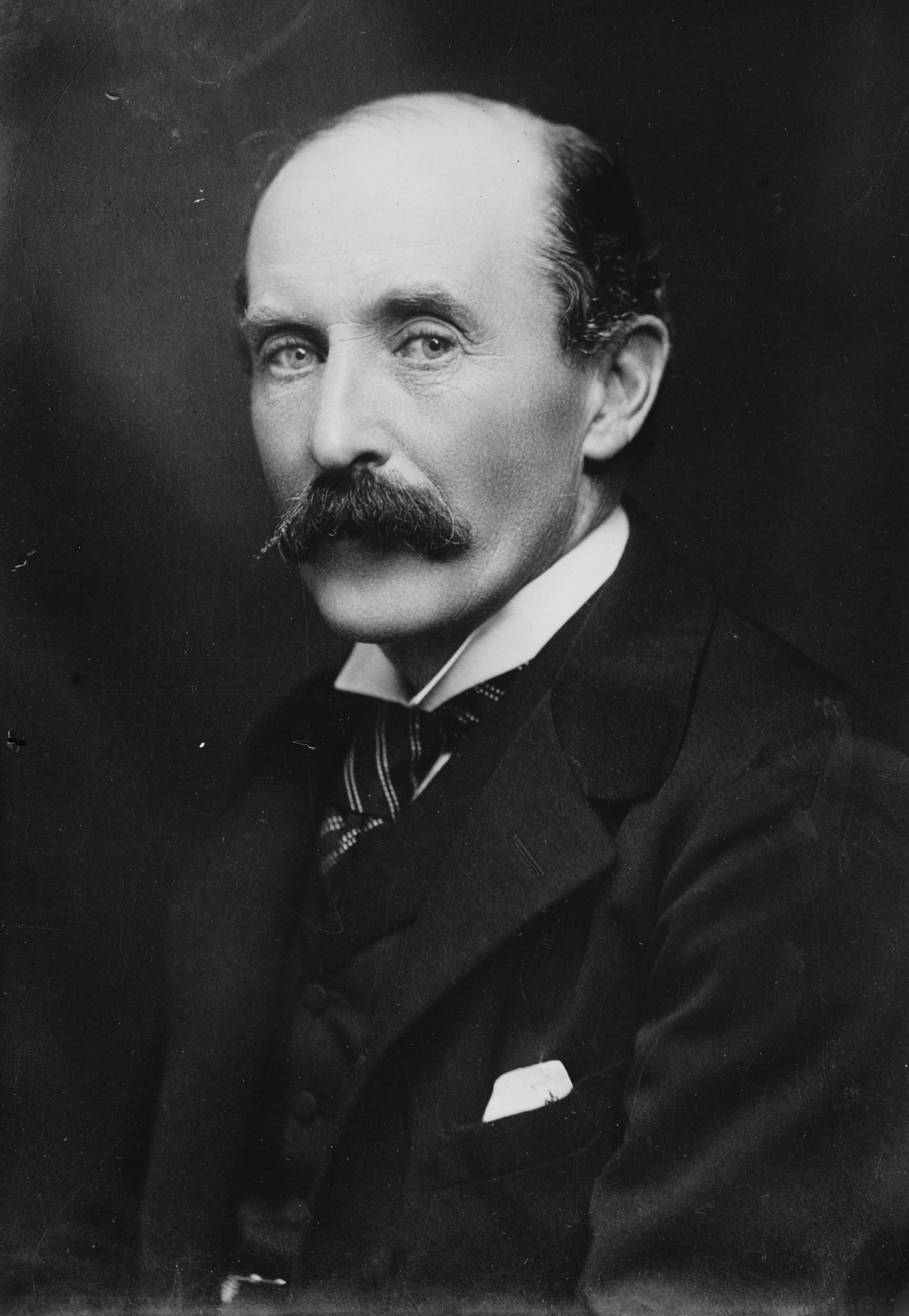
- Arthur Nicolson, 1st Baron Carnock

British Ambassador to Russia
- In office 1906–1910
- Preceded by: Sir Charles Hardinge
- Succeeded by: Sir George Buchanan

British Ambassador to Spain
- In office 1904–1905
- Preceded by: Edwin Henry Egerton
- Succeeded by: Maurice William Ernest de Bunsen

Personal details
- Born: 19 September 1849 London, United Kingdom
- Died: 5 November 1928 (aged 79) London, United Kingdom
- Spouse: Mary Katherine Hamilton (after 1882)
- Children: Frederick Nicolson; Erskine Nicolson; Harold Nicolson; Clementina Nicolson
- Education: Brasenose College, Oxford
- Occupation: Diplomat

Arthur Nicolson, 1st Baron Carnock, GCB, GCMG, GCVO, KCIE, PC (19 September 1849 – 5 November 1928), known as Sir Arthur Nicolson, 11th Baronet, from 1899 to 1916, was a British diplomat and politician during the last quarter of the 19th century to the middle of World War I.

== Early life ==
Born in London, he was the eldest son of Admiral Sir Frederick Nicolson, 10th Baronet by his wife Mary Loch. Educated at Rugby and Brasenose College, Oxford, where he left without taking a degree, he succeeded his father as Baronet in 1899.

== Career ==
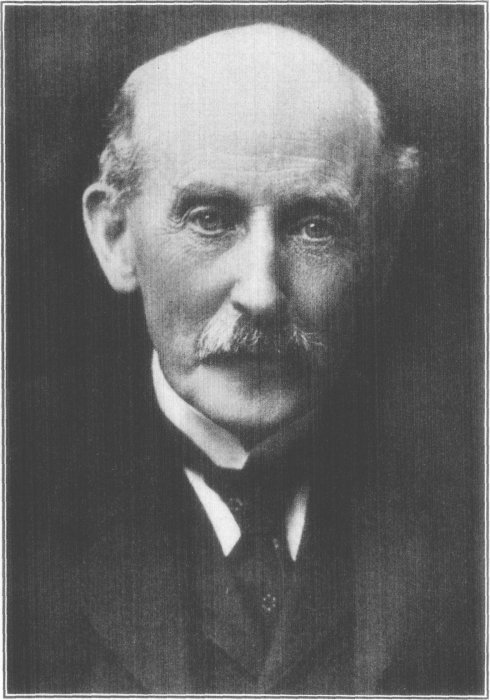
Sir Arthur Nicolson, British Ambassador to Russia

From 1870 to 1874, he worked in the Foreign Office, during which time he was author of the History of the German Constitution (1873).

From 1872 to 1874, he was secretary to Granville Leveson-Gower, 2nd Earl Granville, followed by secretary of the Embassy at Berlin (from 1874 to 1876) and secretary of the Embassy at Peking (1876–1878).

From 1879 to 1881, he was Secretary to the Ambassador at the Embassy at Constantinople. He was promoted to Chargé d'affaires in Athens, where he served from 1884 to 1885, before becoming Chargé in Teheran from 1885 to 1888.

Beginning in 1888, and continuing until 1893, he was Consul-General in Budapest. He was stationed with the Embassy in Constantinople in 1894 before becoming the British Minister at Tangier from 1895 to 1904.

In 1904, he was appointed the British Ambassador to Spain in Madrid, serving until 1905. From 1906 to 1910, he was the British Ambassador to Russia in Saint Petersburg, followed by the Permanent Under Secretary for Foreign Affairs from 1910 to 1916.

On 27 June 1916, he was raised to the peerage as Baron Carnock of Carnock in the County of Stirling.

== Personal life ==
In 1882, Nicolson was married to Mary Katherine Hamilton, daughter of Capt. Archibald Rowan Hamilton, of Killyleagh Castle, Co. Down, and a descendant of Archibald Hamilton Rowan. Together, they had three sons and a daughter:

- Frederick Archibald Nicolson (1883–1952), who succeeded him as 2nd Baron Carnock and died unmarried.
- Erskine Nicolson (1884–1982), who became the 3rd Baron Carnock. He married Hon. Katharine Frederica Albertha Lopes (1892–1968), the eldest daughter of Henry Lopes, 1st Baron Roborough.
- Sir Harold Nicolson (1886–1968), the writer and husband of Vita Sackville-West, daughter of Lionel Sackville-West, 3rd Baron Sackville.
- Clementina Gwendolen Catherine Nicolson (1896–1995), who married Francis St Aubyn, 3rd Baron St Levan.

=== Descendants ===
Through his second son, he was a grandfather of one girl and two boys, including David Nicolson, 4th Baron Carnock. Through his third son Harold, he was a grandfather of Benedict Nicolson, an art historian, and Nigel Nicolson, a politician and writer.

Through his daughter, he was a grandfather of John St Aubyn, 4th Baron St Levan and the Hon. Oliver Piers St Aubyn (father of the 5th Baron St Levan).

== Honours ==
- CMG: Companion of the Order of St Michael and St George – 1886
- KCIE: Knight Companion of the Order of the Indian Empire – 1888
- KCB: Knight Commander of the Order of the Bath – invested 27 June 1901, gazetted 2 July 1901 – on the occasion of the visit to the UK of a Special diplomatic mission from Morocco
- KCVO: Knight Commander of the Royal Victorian Order – 1903
- GCVO: Knight Grand Cross of the Royal Victorian Order – 1905
- GCMG: Knight Grand Cross of the Order of St Michael and St George – 1906
- GCB: Knight Grand Cross of the Order of the Bath – 1907

== Bibliography ==
- Weber, Eugen (1968), The Nationalist Revival in France, 1905-1914, University of California Press, ISBN 9781610697804.
- Nicolson, Harold (1930). Sir Arthur Nicolson: First Lord Carnock. A Study In The Old Diplomacy. London: Constable.

=== Further reading ===
- Hesilrige, Arthur G. M. (1921). Debrett's Peerage and Titles of courtesy. London: London: Dean & son, limited. p. 177.
- Burke, Bernard (2001). Burkes Landed Gentry Including Titled. p. 1108. ISBN 9781579583736.
- Dod, Charles (1982). Dod's peerage. p. 47.

Government offices
Preceded by The Lord Hardinge of Penshurst	Permanent Under-Secretary for Foreign Affairs; 1910–1916	Succeeded by The Lord Hardinge of Penshurst
Peerage of the United Kingdom
New creation	Baron Carnock; 1916–1928	Succeeded by Frederick Archibald Nicolson
Baronetage of Nova Scotia
Preceded by Sir Frederick Nicolson	Baronet (of Carnock); 1899–1929	Succeeded by Frederick Archibald Nicolson
