= Harold Nicolson =

British diplomat, author, diarist and politician (1886–1968)

The Honourable Sir Harold Nicolson KCVO CMG
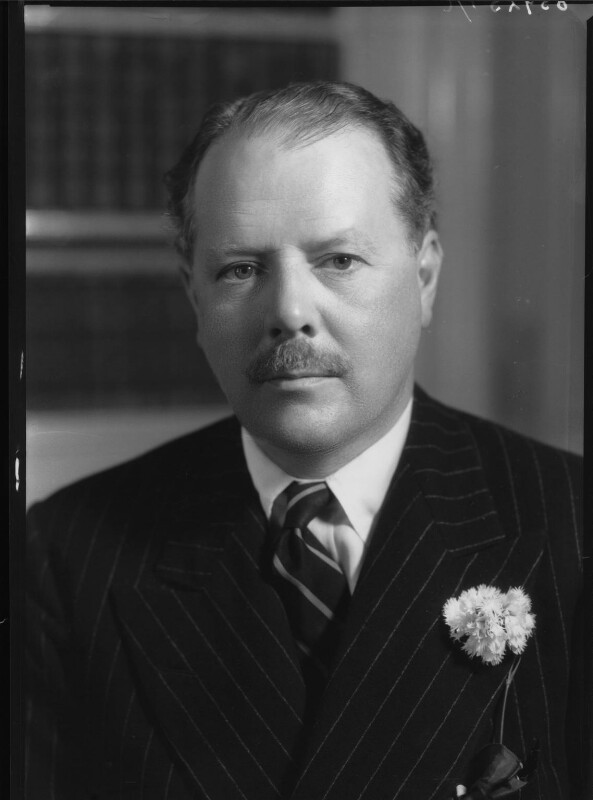
- Nicolson in 1939

Member of Parliament for Leicester West
- In office 14 November 1935 – 15 June 1945
- Preceded by: Ernest Harold Pickering
- Succeeded by: Barnett Janner

Personal details
- Born: Harold George Nicolson; 21 November 1886 Tehran, Sublime State of Persia
- Died: 1 May 1968 (aged 81) Sissinghurst Castle, Kent, England
- Party: New Party (1931-32); National Labour (1935-45); Labour (from 1947)
- Spouse: Vita Sackville-West (m. 1913; d. 1962)
- Children: Benedict Nicolson; Nigel Nicolson
- Parent(s): Arthur Nicolson, 1st Baron Carnock; Mary Hamilton
- Education: Balliol College, Oxford
- Occupation: British diplomat; author; diarist; politician

Sir Harold George Nicolson KCVO CMG (21 November 1886 – 1 May 1968) was a British politician, writer, broadcaster and gardener. His wife was Vita Sackville-West.

== Early life and education ==
Nicolson was born in Tehran, Persia, the youngest son of diplomat Arthur Nicolson, 1st Baron Carnock. He spent his boyhood in various places throughout Europe and the Near East and followed his father's frequent postings, including in St. Petersburg, Constantinople, Madrid, Sofia, and Tangier. He was educated at The Grange School in Folkestone, Kent, followed by Wellington College. He attended Balliol College, Oxford, graduating in 1909 with a third-class degree. Nicolson entered the Foreign Office that same year, after passing second in the competitive exams for the Diplomatic Service and Civil Service.

== Diplomatic career ==
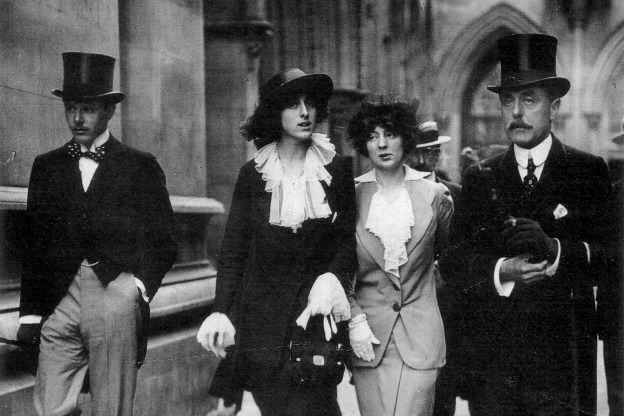
From left to right: Harold Nicolson, Vita Sackville-West, Rosamund Grosvenor, and Lionel Sackville-West in 1913

In 1909, Nicolson joined HM Diplomatic Service. He served as attaché at Madrid from February to September 1911 and as Third Secretary at Constantinople from January 1912 to October 1914. In 1913, Nicolson married Vita Sackville-West, who later became famous as a novelist and garden designer. Nicolson and his wife practised what would now be called an open marriage, with both having affairs with others of the same sex.

A diplomatic career was honourable and prestigious in Edwardian Britain, but Sackville-West's parents were aristocrats who wanted their daughter to marry a fellow member of an old noble family and so gave only reluctant approval to the marriage.

During the First World War, Nicolson served at the Foreign Office in London during which period he was promoted to Second Secretary. As the Foreign Office's most junior employee of this rank, it fell to him on 4 August 1914 to hand Britain's revised declaration of war to Prince Max von Lichnowsky, the German ambassador in London. He served in a junior capacity in the Paris Peace Conference in 1919 for which he was appointed Companion of the Order of St Michael and St George (CMG) in the 1920 New Year Honours. In his book entitled Peacemaking 1919, he expressed critical views including racial stereotyping about Hungarians and Turks during the peace treaty in Paris.

Promoted to First Secretary in 1920, he was appointed private secretary to Sir Eric Drummond, the first Secretary-General of the League of Nations, but was recalled to the Foreign Office in June 1920. In the same year, Sackville-West became involved in an intense relationship with Violet Trefusis that nearly wrecked her marriage. As Nicolson wrote in his diary, "Damn! Damn! Damn! Violet. How I loathe her". On one occasion, Nicolson had to follow Vita to France, where she had "eloped" with Trefusis, to try to win her back.

Nicolson himself was no stranger to homosexual affairs; he was openly, but not publicly, bisexual. Among others, he was involved in a long-term relationship with Raymond Mortimer, whom both he and Vita affectionately referred to as "Tray". Nicolson and Vita discussed their shared homosexual tendencies frankly with each other, and they remained happy together. They were famously devoted to each other and wrote almost every day when they were separated because of Nicolson's long diplomatic postings abroad or Vita's insatiable wanderlust. Eventually, he gave up diplomacy, partly so that they could live together in England.

In 1925, he was promoted to counsellor and posted to Tehran as chargé d'affaires. The same year, General Reza Khan deposed the last Qajar Shah, Ahmad Shah Qajar, to take the Peacock Throne for himself. Though it was not entirely appropriate for a foreign diplomat's wife, Sackville-West became deeply involved in the coronation of Reza Khan as the new Shah. Nicolson personally disliked Reza Khan and called him "a bullet-headed man with the voice of an asthmatic child".

Reza Khan disliked British influence in Iran, and after being crowned Shah, he submitted a "categorical note" that demanded the "removal of Indian savars [mounted guards] from Persia". The Savars had been used to guard the British Legation in Tehran and various consulates across Persia, and Reza Khan felt having the troops of a foreign power riding through the streets of his capital was an infringement of his sovereignty. As chargé d'affairs, Nicolson was in charge of the British Legation in the summer of 1926 and upon receiving the Iranian note, he rushed down to the Iranian Foreign Ministry to object. Nicolson writing in the third person stated he had a "Kipling inside him and something of an 'empire builder'" told the Persian officials that the note was "so categorical to be almost offensive" and wanted it withdrawn. The Persians stated that the note had been written by Reza Khan and could not be withdrawn, but ultimately an annex was added to the note, which softened its threatening tone. However, much to the satisfaction of Reza Khan, the British had to abide by what Nicolson called a "frank and honest" note by withdrawing the savars.

In the summer of 1927, Nicolson was recalled to London and demoted to First Secretary for criticising the minister Sir Percy Loraine in a dispatch. However, he was posted to Berlin as chargé d'affaires in 1928 and promoted as counsellor again, but he resigned from the Diplomatic Service in September 1929.

== Political career ==
From 1930 to 1931, Nicolson edited the "Londoner's Diary" gossip column for the London evening paper, the Evening Standard, but disliked writing about high-society gossip and quit within a year.

In 1931, he joined Sir Oswald Mosley and his recently formed New Party. He stood unsuccessfully for Parliament for the Combined English Universities in the general election that year and edited the party newspaper, Action. After Mosley formed the British Union of Fascists the following year, Nicolson ceased to support him.

Nicolson entered the House of Commons as National Labour Member of Parliament (MP) for Leicester West in the 1935 election. In the latter half of the 1930s, he was one of the relatively few MPs to alert the country to the threat of fascism. More a follower of Anthony Eden in that regard than of Winston Churchill, Nicolson was still a friend of Churchill but not an intimate one. Nicolson often supported Churchill's efforts in the Commons to stiffen British resolve and support rearmament.

A Francophile, Nicolson was a close friend of Charles Corbin, the Anglophile and anti-appeasement French ambassador to the Court of St James's.

In September 1938 when Neville Chamberlain returned from Munich with his and Hitler's signature on their "peace" agreement most of the MPs in the house rose in "tumultuous acclamation", a few like Nicolson remained seated; the Tory MP Walter Liddall hissed at him "Stand up, you brute". Other MPs to remain seated were Winston Churchill (who initially rose to catch the Speaker's eye to speak), Leo Amery, Vyvyan Adams, Anthony Eden (who walked out "pale with shame and anger").

In October 1938, Nicolson spoke out against the Munich Agreement in the House of Commons:

"I know that those of us who believe in the traditions of our policy, who believe that one great function of this country is to maintain moral standards in Europe, not to make friends with people whose conduct is demonstrably evil, but to set up some sort of standard by which smaller powers can test what is good in international conduct and what is not-I know that those who hold such beliefs are accused of possessing the Foreign Office mind. I thank God that I possess a Foreign Office mind".

In June 1940, Nicolson met the French writer André Maurois at the time when France was on the verge of defeat, which led Nicolson to write in his diary:

"June 12, 1940. I saw André Maurois in the morning. He left Paris yesterday. He said that never before in his life had he experienced such agony as he did when he saw Paris basking under a lovely summer day and realised that he might never see it again. I do feel so deeply for the French. Paris is to them what our countryside is to us. If we were to feel the lanes of Devonshire, the rocks of Cornwall and our own unflaunting England were all concentrated in one spot and likely to be wiped out, we would feel all the pain in the world".

He became Parliamentary Secretary and official Censor at the Ministry of Information in Churchill's 1940 wartime government of national unity, serving under Cabinet member Duff Cooper for approximately a year until he was asked by Churchill to leave his position in order to make way for Ernest Thurtle MP as the Labour Party demanded more of their MPs in the Government; thereafter he was a well-respected backbencher, especially on foreign policy issues, given his early and prominent diplomatic career. From 1941 to 1946 he was also on the Board of Governors of the BBC.

In 1944, during the Battle of Monte Cassino, it was widely (but wrongly) believed that the Germans were using the abbey of Monte Cassino in Italy as an observation post to direct fire down at the Allied forces in the valley below: many demanded for the abbey to be bombed to save the lives of the Allied soldiers that were attempting to advance up the valley to take the heights of Monte Cassino, which was a key point in the Gustav line. In February 1944, Nicolson caused controversy with a column in The Spectator by saying that art was irreplaceable, but human life was expendable. He opposed the bombing of Monte Cassino abbey and said that it was a great work of art that itself contained many works of art that could never be replaced even if that meant the death of his own son, Nigel Nicolson, who was serving in the Eighth Army as it was fighting the Battle of Monte Cassino, and that it was morally better to take thousands of dead and wounded than to destroy the abbey of Monte Cassino. Much to Nicolson's chagrin, the abbey was destroyed by an American bombing raid on 15 February 1944.

When Nicolson, a Francophile, visited France in March 1945 for the first time in five years, upon landing in France he kissed the earth. When a Frenchman asked the prostrate Nicolson "Monsieur a laissé tomber quelque-chose?" ("Sir, have you dropped something?"), Nicolson replied, "Non, j'ai retrouvé quelque-chose" ("No, I have recovered something"). The exchange is little known in Britain but is well remembered in France.

After losing his seat in the 1945 general election, he joined the Labour Party, much to the dismay of his family, in an unsuccessful attempt to secure a hereditary peerage from Clement Attlee; Nicolson stood in the 1948 Croydon North by-election but lost once again.

In 1960, at the Paris summit, Nicolson wrote about the behaviour of the Soviet Premier Nikita Khrushchev implying that he was "a little mad" and the "exchange of insults is not the best method of conducting relations between sovereign states".

== Writer ==
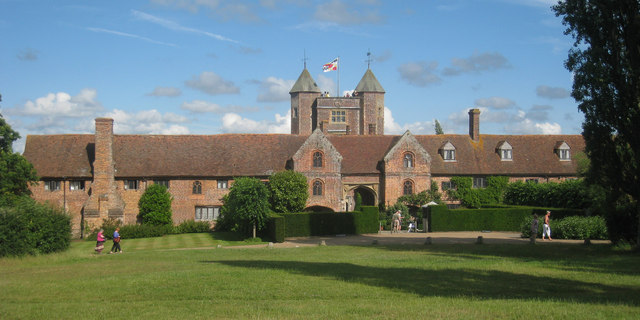
Sissinghurst Castle

Encouraged in his literary ambitions by his wife, who was also a writer, Nicolson published a biography of French poet Paul Verlaine in 1921, which was followed by studies of other literary figures such as Tennyson, Byron, Swinburne, and Sainte-Beuve. In 1933, he wrote an account of the Paris Peace Conference Peacemaking 1919.

Nicolson noted that "although I loathe antisemitism I do dislike Jews". In his diaries, he expressed trepidation over making admission as a civil servant to the Foreign Office less exclusive: "Jews are far more interested in international life than are Englishmen. And if we opened the service it might be flooded with clever Jews." Tony Kushner argued that he typified the antisemite who "warned publicly against the dangers of antisemitism at any level, yet privately hated the very presence of Jews". Without evidence, he assumed in his diaries in 1944 that a group of girls relaxing with American GIs were Jewish: "I am all for a little promiscuity. But nymphomania among East End Jewesses and for such large sums of money makes me sick."

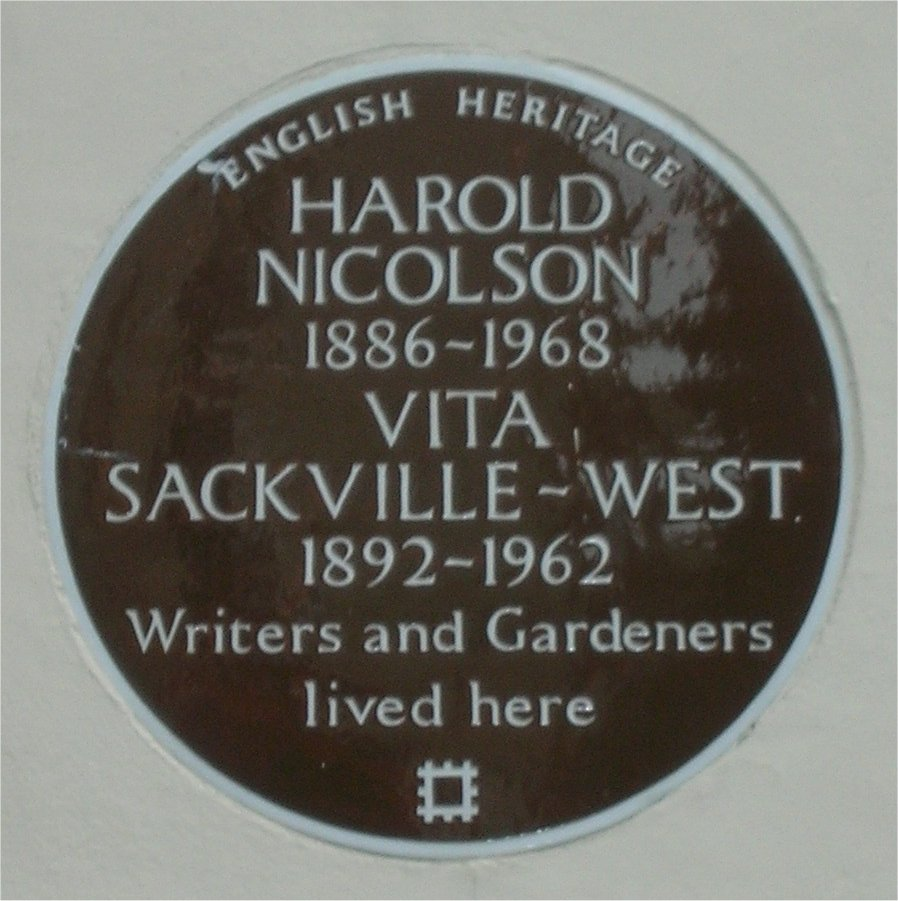
Commemorative plaque in Ebury Street, London

Nicolson is also remembered for his 1932 novel Public Faces, which foreshadowed the nuclear bomb. A fictional account of British national policy in 1939, it tells how Britain's Secretary of State tries to keep world peace with the Royal Air Force aggressively brandishing rocket aeroplanes and an atomic bomb. In today's terms, it was a multi-megaton bomb, and the geology of the Persian Gulf played a central role, but on the other hand, the likes of Hitler were not foreseen.

After Nicolson's last attempt to enter Parliament failed, he continued with an extensive social schedule and his programme of writing, which included books, book reviews, and a weekly column for The Spectator.

His diary has been described as one of the pre-eminent 20th-century British diaries, and a noteworthy source on British political history from 1930 to the 1950s, particularly in regard to the period before the Second World War and the war itself. Nicolson was in positions high enough to write of the workings of the circles of power and of the day-to-day unfolding of great events. His fellow parliamentarian Robert Bernays characterized Nicolson as being "a national figure of the second degree".

Nicolson was variously an acquaintance, associate, friend or intimate to such political figures as Ramsay MacDonald, David Lloyd George, Duff Cooper, Charles de Gaulle, Anthony Eden and Winston Churchill, along with a host of literary and artistic figures, including C. E. M. Joad of the BBC's The Brains Trust.

== Family ==
He and his wife had two sons, Benedict, an art historian, and Nigel, a politician and writer. Nigel later published works by and about his parents, including Portrait of a Marriage, their correspondence, and Nicolson's diary.

In 1930, Vita Sackville-West acquired Sissinghurst Castle, near Cranbrook in Kent. There the couple created the renowned gardens that are now run by the National Trust.

== Honours ==
He was appointed Knight Commander of the Royal Victorian Order (KCVO) in 1953 as a reward for writing the official biography of George V, which had been published the previous year.

There is a blue plaque commemorating him and his wife on their house in Ebury Street, London SW1.

== Works ==
Many of the books are online.

- Paul Verlaine (Constable, 1921)
- Sweet Waters (Constable, 1921) novel; new ed. 2012 by Eland
- Tennyson: Aspects of His Life, Character and Poetry (Constable, 1923)
- Byron: The Last Journey (Constable, 1924)
- Swinburne (Macmillan, 1926)
- Some People: Memoirs (Constable, 1927)
- The Development of English Biography (The Hogarth Press, 1927) (Hogarth Lectures No. 4)
- Swinburne and Baudelaire: The Zaharoff Lecture (The Clarendon Press, 1930)
- Portrait of a Diplomatist: Being the Life of Sir Arthur Nicolson, First Lord Carnock, and a Study of the Origins of the Great War (Houghton Mifflin, 1930) online
- People and Things: Wireless Talks (Constable, 1931)
- Public Faces: A Novel (Constable, 1932) novel
- Peacemaking 1919 (Constable, 1933) re-set 1944 online
- Curzon: The Last Phase, 1919–1925: A Study in Post-War Diplomacy (Constable, 1934)
- Dwight Morrow (Harcourt, Brace and Company, 1935)
- Politics in the Train (Constable, 1936)
- Helen's Tower (Constable, 1937)
- Small Talk (Constable, 1937)
- Diplomacy (Thornton Butterworth, 1939) (Home University Library of Modern Knowledge)
- Marginal Comment (January 6 – August 4, 1939) (Constable, 1939)
- Why Britain is at War (Penguin Books, 1939) (Penguin Specials)
- The Desire to Please: The Story of Hamilton Rowan and the United Irishmen (Constable, 1943)
- The Poetry of Byron: The English Association Presidential Address, August 1943 (Oxford University Press, 1943)
- Friday Mornings 1941–1944 (Constable, 1944)
- England: An Anthology (Macmillan, 1944)
- Another World Than This: An Anthology (Michael Joseph, 1945) edited with Vita Sackville-West
- The Congress of Vienna: A Study in Allied Unity: 1812–1822 (Constable, 1946)
- Comments 1944–1948 (Constable, 1948) – collected articles from the Spectator
- Benjamin Constant (Constable, 1949)
- King George V (Constable, 1952)
- The Evolution of Diplomacy (Constable, 1954) – Chichele Lectures 1953
- The English Sense of Humour and other Essays (The Dropmore Press, 1946)
- Good Behaviour, being a Study of Certain Types of Civility (Constable, 1955)
- Sainte-Beuve (Constable, 1957)
- Journey to Java (London: Constable, 1957)
- The Age of Reason (1700–1789) (Constable, 1960)
- Tennyson: Aspects of his Life, Character and Poetry (Arrow, 1960) (Grey Arrow Books, no. 39)
- Monarchy (Weidenfeld & Nicolson, 1962)
- Diaries and Letters 1930–39; Diaries and Letters 1939–45; Diaries and Letters 1945–62 (Collins, 1966–68) - edited by Nigel Nicolson; Diaries and Letters 1930-1964 (Collins, 1980) - new and condensed edition

== See also ==
- List of Bloomsbury Group people

Parliament of the United Kingdom
Preceded by Ernest Harold Pickering	Member of Parliament for Leicester West; 1935–1945	Succeeded by Barnett Janner
