= Murchison letter =

1888 presidential election scandal

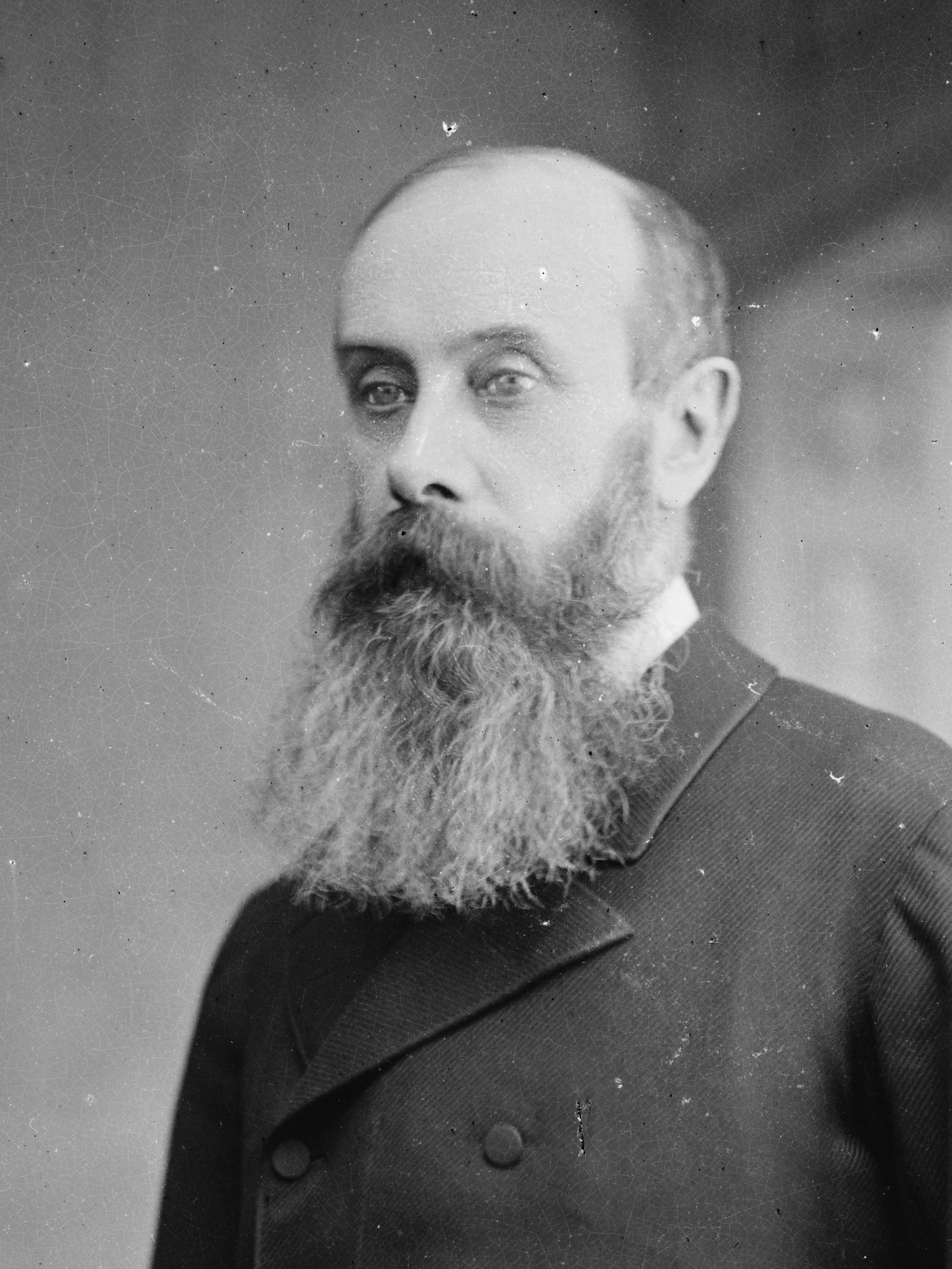
Lionel Sackville-West

The Murchison letter was a political scandal during the 1888 United States presidential election between Grover Cleveland, the Democratic incumbent, and the Republican nominee, Benjamin Harrison.

The letter was sent by the British ambassador to the United States, Sir Lionel Sackville-West, to "Charles F. Murchison", who was actually an American political operative posing as a British expatriate. In the letter, Sackville-West suggested that Cleveland was preferred as president from the British point of view.

The Republicans published this letter just two weeks before the election, causing many Irish American voters to turn away from Cleveland; he consequently lost New York and Indiana, and thus the presidency. Sackville-West was sacked as British ambassador.

== History ==
A California Republican, George Osgoodby, wrote a letter to Sir Lionel Sackville-West, the British ambassador to the United States, under the assumed name of "Charles F. Murchison", who described himself as a former Englishman who was now a California citizen and asked how he should vote in the upcoming presidential election. Sackville-West wrote back and indiscreetly suggested that Grover Cleveland, the Democratic incumbent, was probably the best man from the British point of view:

Sir: I am in receipt of your letter of the 4th instant, and beg to say that I fully appreciate the difficulty in which you find yourself in casting your vote. You are probably aware that any political party which openly favored the mother country at the present moment would lose popularity, and that the party in power is fully aware of this fact. The party, however, is, I believe, still desirous of maintaining friendly relations with Great Britain, and is still as desirous of settling all questions with Canada which have been unfortunately re-opened since the retraction of the treaty (Note: Sackville-West is referring to the defeat of the Fisheries Treaty in the US Senate in August 1888. The treaty with Great Britain aimed to settle a dispute over the interpretation of the Treaty of 1818. It was supported by Cleveland's Democrats and opposed by the Republican majority "with the view of discrediting President Cleveland.") by the Republican majority in the Senate and by the President's message, to which you allude. All allowances must, therefore, be made for the political situation as regards the Presidential election thus created. It is, however, impossible to predict the course which President Cleveland may pursue in the matter of retaliation should he be elected, but there is every reason to believe that, while upholding the position he has taken, he will manifest a spirit of conciliation in dealing with the question involved in his message. I inclose an article from the New York Times of the 22d of August, and remain, yours, faithfully,

— L.S. Sackville West., Beverly, Mass., September 13, 1888.

The Republicans published the letter just two weeks before the election, and it had a galvanizing effect on Irish-American voters exactly comparable to the "Rum, Romanism, and Rebellion" blunder of the previous presidential election: by trumpeting Great Britain's support for the Democrats. That drove Irish American voters into the Republican fold, and Cleveland lost the presidency.

== Aftermath ==
Following the election, the lame-duck Cleveland administration brought about Sackville-West's removal as ambassador, citing not only his letter—which could have been defended as a private correspondence unintended for publication—but also his subsequent interviews, such as one with a reporter for the New York Herald:

He would cheerfully have given his consent to the publication of the letter if the formality of asking his consent had occurred to those concerned in its publication. He understood, from what was said in the letter to which he was replying, that his answer would be shown to other people than the recipient of it. Consequently it was advised that he use the term "private" to distinguish the letter from those that he had occasion to write on the public business of his office.

The suggestion that a foreign ambassador should not write unofficial letters on the domestic politics of the country to which he is accredited was dismissed by Lord Sackville in a summary fashion. It happens constantly, he says, in his intercourse with people, that statements are made to him, and information, opinion, and advice asked of him, touching matters beyond his sphere and duty as a diplomatic agent of Her Majesty, and in all such instances he acts as any rational and considerate person would. What he would say in a personal interview he would, of course, not hesitate to write to an absent informant or inquirer, and he wrote to the gentleman at Pomona substantially what he should have told him at Beverly had he been called upon there.

In thanking Lord Sackville for his patience and courtesy, I told him that because of the supposed interests of one of our political parties he would probably be severely attacked in the papers for a few days on account of his letter. He replied, laughingly: "Indeed! Well, let them come on. I read all the papers, you know, and I shall enjoy it greatly, I assure you."

— Reported in The New York Herald, October 23, 1888.

On October 1, Sackville-West had become Lord Sackville, due to the death of his brother Mortimer Sackville-West, 1st Baron Sackville.

Cleveland returned to the White House by winning the 1892 election.

== See also ==
- Anglophobia#United States
- Year of the Three Emperors
