= Roedean =

Village in Brighton and Hove

Coordinates: 50°48′54.8″N 0°5′43.5″W

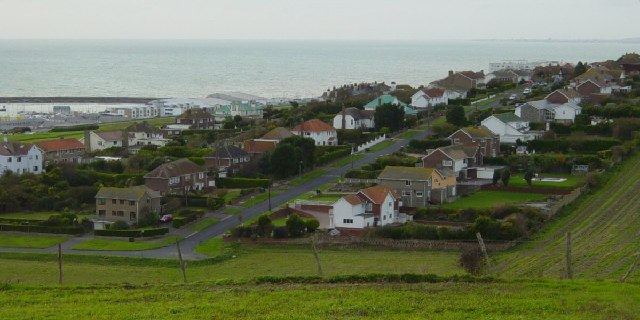
View of Roedean

Roedean is a village in the city of Brighton and Hove, England, east of the seaside resort of Brighton.

== Notable buildings and areas ==
Roedean Gap is a slight dip in the cliffs between Black Rock and Ovingdean Gap, and has been known by the name since at least 1724. It was the site of a toll-gate on the Newhaven turnpike, and Roedean Farm stood on the clifftop until the construction of the Marine Drive road in the early 1930s. There was also a windmill at Roedean from around 1750 to about 1790, and the old mill-house was amongst the buildings cleared for the road construction.

Roedean Road itself opened between Arundel Road and the coast road at Roedean Farm in 1897 as an alternative to the cliff-top road which had become unusable to the east of Black Rock owing to cliff erosion; seventy-five feet of land had disappeared in fifty years. The new road to Rottingdean, Marine Drive, was opened on 22 July 1932 by Percy John Pybus, Minister of Transport, with the cliffs protected by the Undercliff Walk sea-wall.

=== Roedean School ===
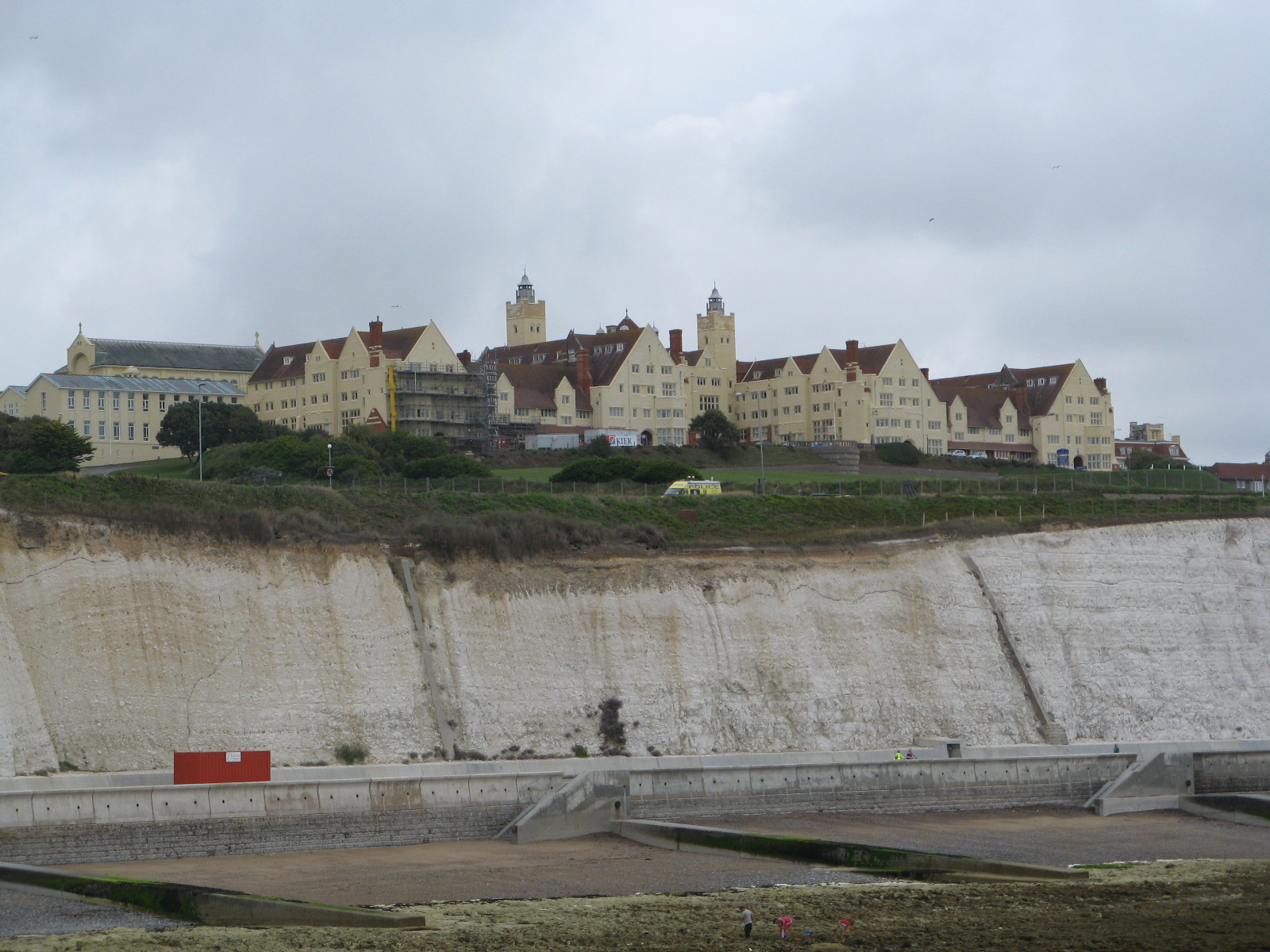
Roedean School and cliffs

The village is known for its independent school, Roedean School.

=== White Lodge ===
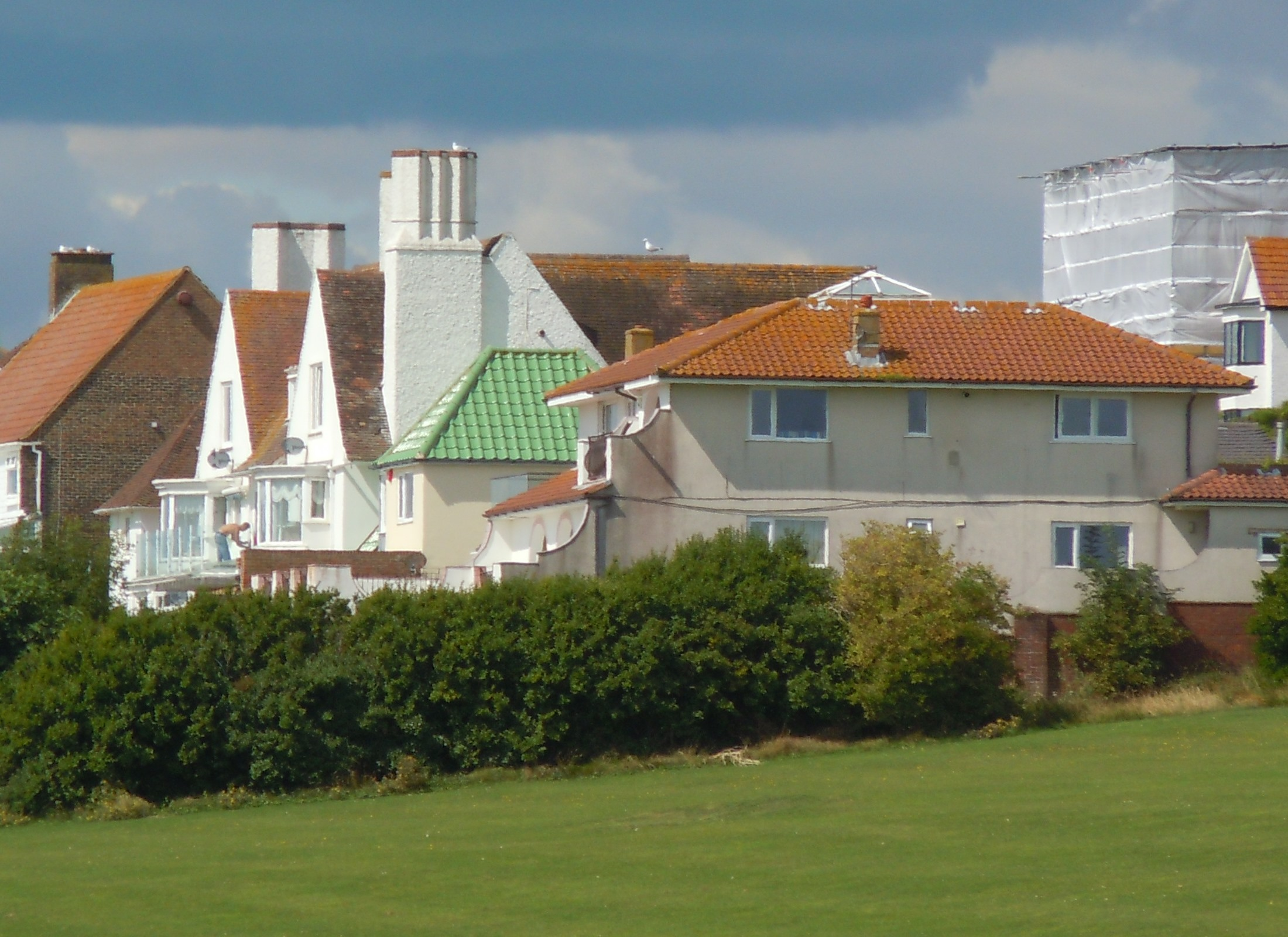
White Lodge, The Cliff, Roedean

White Lodge, The Cliff, is an atypically small house by Sir Edwin Lutyens, built for Victoria Sackville. It was one of the architect's first commissions, and herringbone-style vertically laid floor tiles in the garden were in part laid by the architect himself.

=== John Howard House ===
John Howard House at the western end of Roedean Road (which today would be considered part of the mid-late 20th century East Brighton estate of Whitehawk) was opened in 1914 at the expense of Sir John Howard as a convalescent home for gentlewomen, but it was almost immediately requisitioned for use as an officers' hospital in World War I. In 1974 it became a home of the Royal Hospital and Home for Incurables, which is based in Putney and run on a voluntary basis. It is now the site of the Brighton Steiner School.

=== Roedean Bottom ===
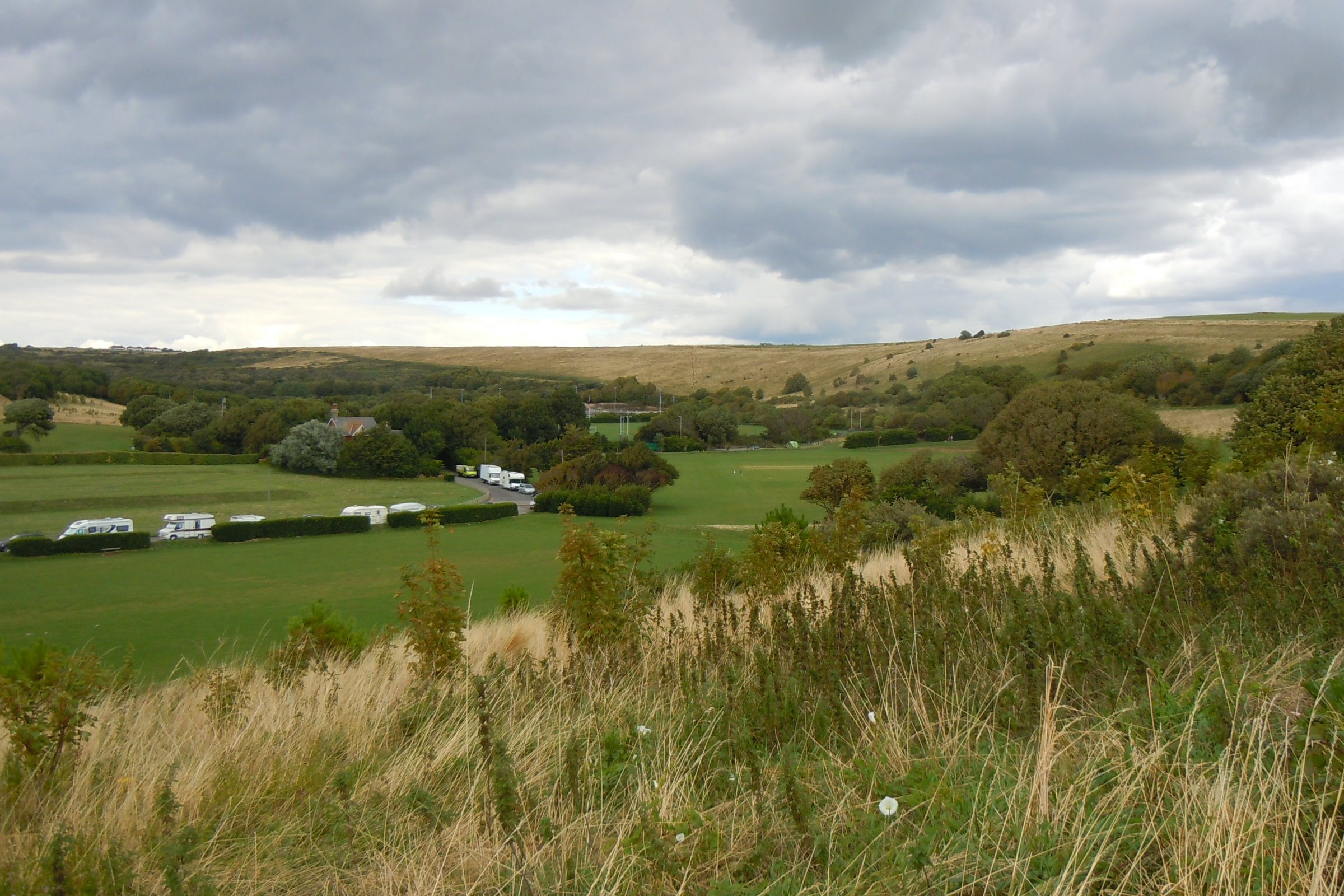
Northward view across East Brighton Park from Roedean Road

Roedean Bottom extends northwards from the gap and has been the site of a number of Roman finds. In about 1900 an isolated row of coastguard cottages now known as Roedean Terrace was erected to the west of the valley. The Roedean estate, which was developed around the terrace from the 1930s, is now one of Brighton's most exclusive residential districts with a population of around 600. The open spaces along the cliff top were acquired by the corporation in 1928–35. The miniature golf-course opened in April 1957, but was reduced to 16 holes in 1988 for the new layout of Marine Drive to cater for Marina traffic; the adjacent area to the north of Roedean Road has also been used as a pitch-and-putt golf course.

Stretching north, between the pitch and putt golf course and the Roedean School is a downland meadow. On its east slope of the Bottom there is a little piece of aboriginal Downland turf, where in late summer autumn ladies tresses orchid grow, with carline thistle and hairy violet. Tiny moss snail in the turf demonstrates the site's antiquity. In autumn migrant birds gather there and on the grazed fields yellow wagtails gather and in the trees above the school Pallas' Warbler was seen in 2020.

=== East Brighton Golf Club ===
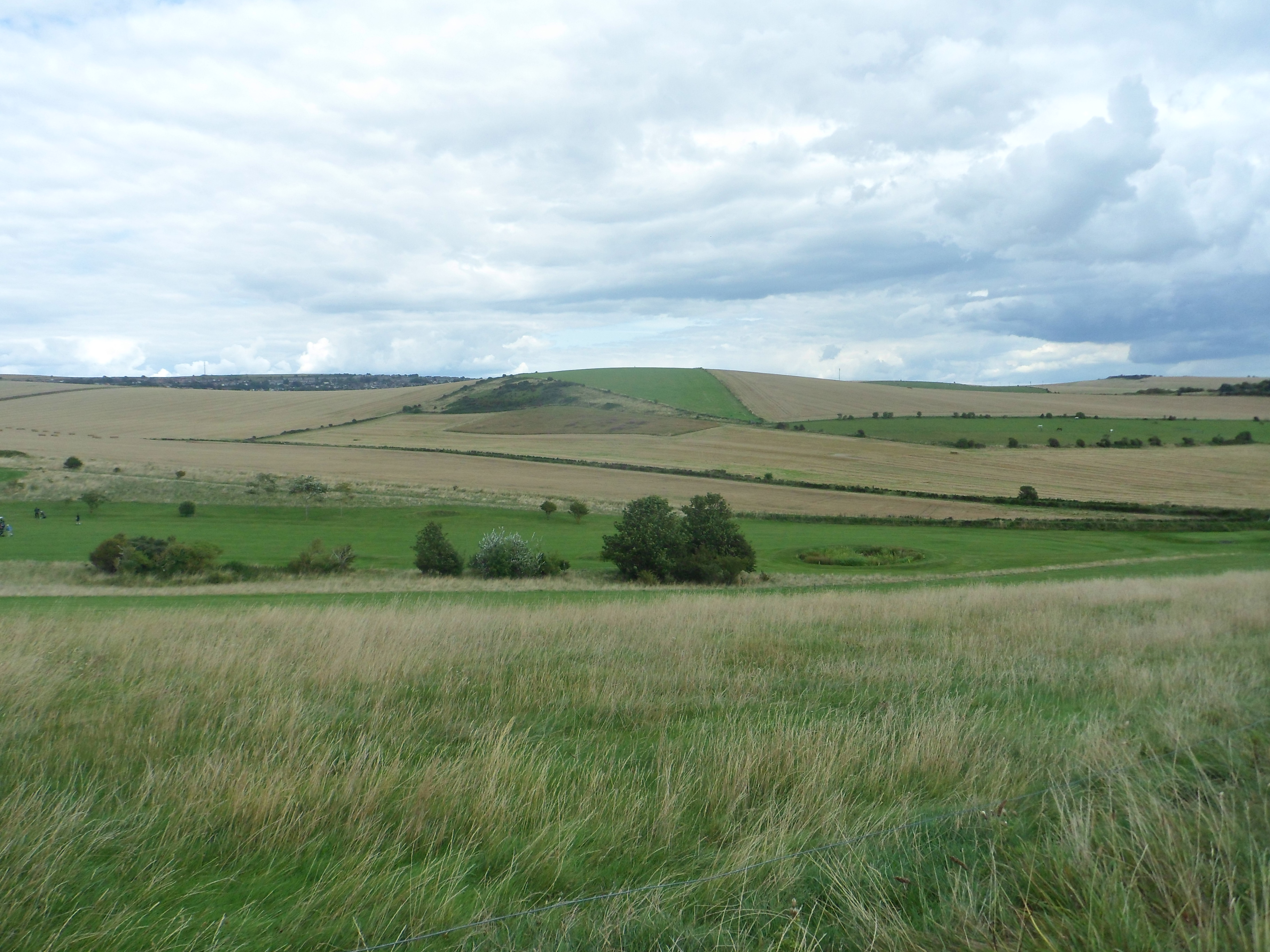
View from Footpath above East Brighton Golf Course

The East Brighton Golf Club in Roedean Road is a private club, founded in 1893 as the Kemp Town Golf Club. Initially it had just a few holes alongside Roedean Road, but it was soon extended to nine holes across the Downs, and in 1897 changed its name to East Brighton with the addition of another nine holes. The small clubhouse was near the present fourth tee, but the present clubhouse was erected in 1897 and extended several times until 1912. The course itself is 6,291 yards long and was remodelled in 1903 along Wick Bottom; the land is leased from the corporation which acquired it in September 1913 as part of the East Brighton estate. Past presidents of the club include the Duke of Norfolk, Marquess of Abergavenny, Earl of Chichester and Earl Haig. Unlike many Downland courses still has its roughs to scrub thickets and woodland and in winter short-eared owls often reside in the area.
