= Ralph Berners =

British Army officer

Brigadier-General Ralph Berners DSO
- Born: 14 June 1871
- Died: 25 February 1949 (aged 77)
- Military career
- Allegiance: United Kingdom
- Branch: British Army
- Service years: 1890–1920
- Rank: Brigadier-General
- Commands: 21st Brigade; 9th Battalion, Royal Welch Fusiliers; 1st Battalion, Royal Welch Fusiliers
- Conflicts: Hazara Expedition of 1888; First World War; Third Anglo-Afghan War
- Awards: Distinguished Service Order; Mentioned in Despatches

Brigadier-General Ralph Abercrombie Berners DSO (14 June 1871 – 25 February 1949) was a British Army officer who briefly commanded the 4th Division during the First World War.

== Military career ==
Educated at Eton College and the Royal Military College, Sandhurst, Berners was commissioned into the Royal Welch Fusiliers (RWF) on 28 October 1890. He was posted to India and took part in the Hazara Expedition in 1888 and then joined the International Squadron in Crete in 1897. He was promoted to captain on 22 February 1899.

After a tour in command of the regimental depot in the early 20th century, Berners was given command of the 1st Battalion of his regiment in France in May 1915 during the First World War. He commanded his battalion at the Battle of Loos in September and then transferred to the 9th Battalion of his regiment, which was also engaged on the Western Front. On 27 September he succeeded Major General Herbert Watts as general officer commanding (GOC) of the 7th Division's 21st Infantry Brigade and was granted the temporary rank of brigadier general while employed in this role.

He was appointed a Companion of the Distinguished Service Order (DSO) on 4 June 1917.

After Major-General William Lambton was incapacitated on 12 September 1917, Berners briefly took over command of the 4th Division and remained in command until he was relieved on 21 September 1917.

He went on to command a brigade in the 2nd Indian Division in 1919 during the Third Anglo-Afghan War, before retiring from the army in 1920.
