= Long Barn =

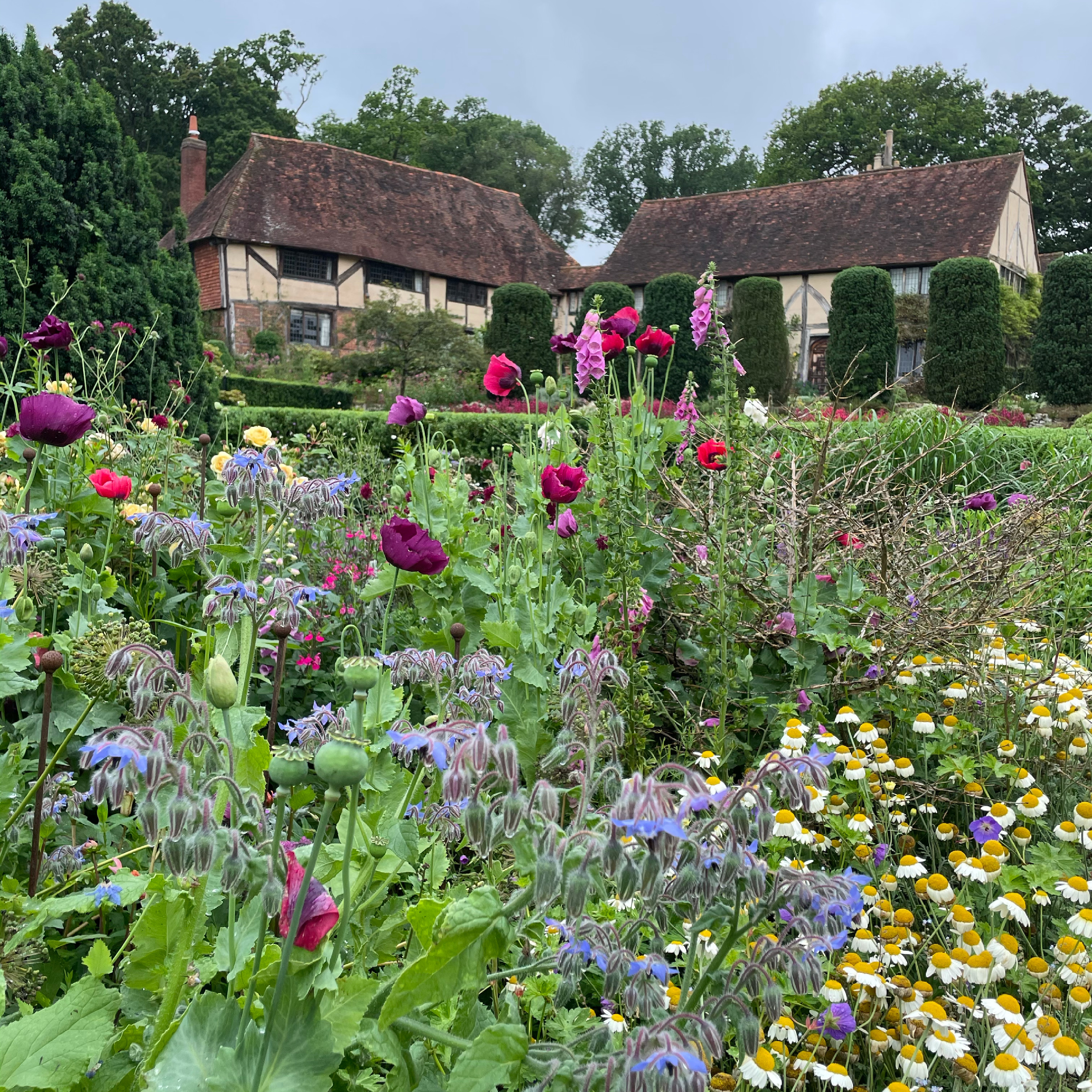
- Long Barn house and garden

- Location within Kent
- 51.2339°N 0.185°E
- Type: House
- Location: Sevenoaks, Kent

History
- Built: 14th-16th centuries

Site notes
- Architectural style: Vernacular
- Governing body: Privately owned

Listed Building – Grade II*
- Official name: Long Barn
- Designated: 10 September 1954
- Reference no.: 1272861

Long Barn, located in the village of Sevenoaks Weald, Kent, is a Grade II* listed building and a Grade II* registered garden. Reputedly the birthplace of William Caxton, the house was later the home of Vita Sackville-West and Harold Nicolson. During their ownership, the house is also notable for famous residents such as Douglas Fairbanks and Charles Lindbergh.

== History ==
Long Barn is thought to date in part from the mid-fourteenth century, at which time this substantial house was divided into farm workers' accommodation. The printer William Caxton is said to have been born at the house. By the nineteenth century it had been restored and extended by the addition of a long barn, hence the name of the house, which was moved to the site from the field below. Restoration work was started by the Thompsons and later continued by the diplomat Harold Nicolson and his wife, writer Vita Sackville-West, who lived there until 1931.

A formal garden was begun by Sackville-West and Nicolson when they bought the house in 1915. The garden at Long Barn, like their later garden at Sissinghurst, was a product of the couple's different tastes and temperaments. It was further developed by their friend Edwin Lutyens in 1925. The house is a Grade II* listed building and the garden a Grade II* registered garden.

== Visitors ==
The Bloomsbury Group often met at Long Barn, and visitors included Virginia Woolf, Stephen Spender, Clive Bell, Lytton Strachey, E. M. Forster, Hugh Walpole, and others such as Roy Campbell, Rosamund Grosvenor (Vita's childhood lover), Violet Trefusis, Charlie Chaplin, and Douglas Fairbanks.

After the kidnapping of their son, the American aviator Charles Lindbergh and his wife, the aviator and author Anne Morrow, rented the house from the Nicolsons. Their second child is remembered by the villagers as being watched over by an armed body guard while playing in the grounds.

== Present day ==
The house and garden are privately owned but the garden is open for pre-booked group tours and garden courses.
