= Vita Sackville-West =

English writer and gardener (1892–1962)

The Honourable Vita Sackville-West CH
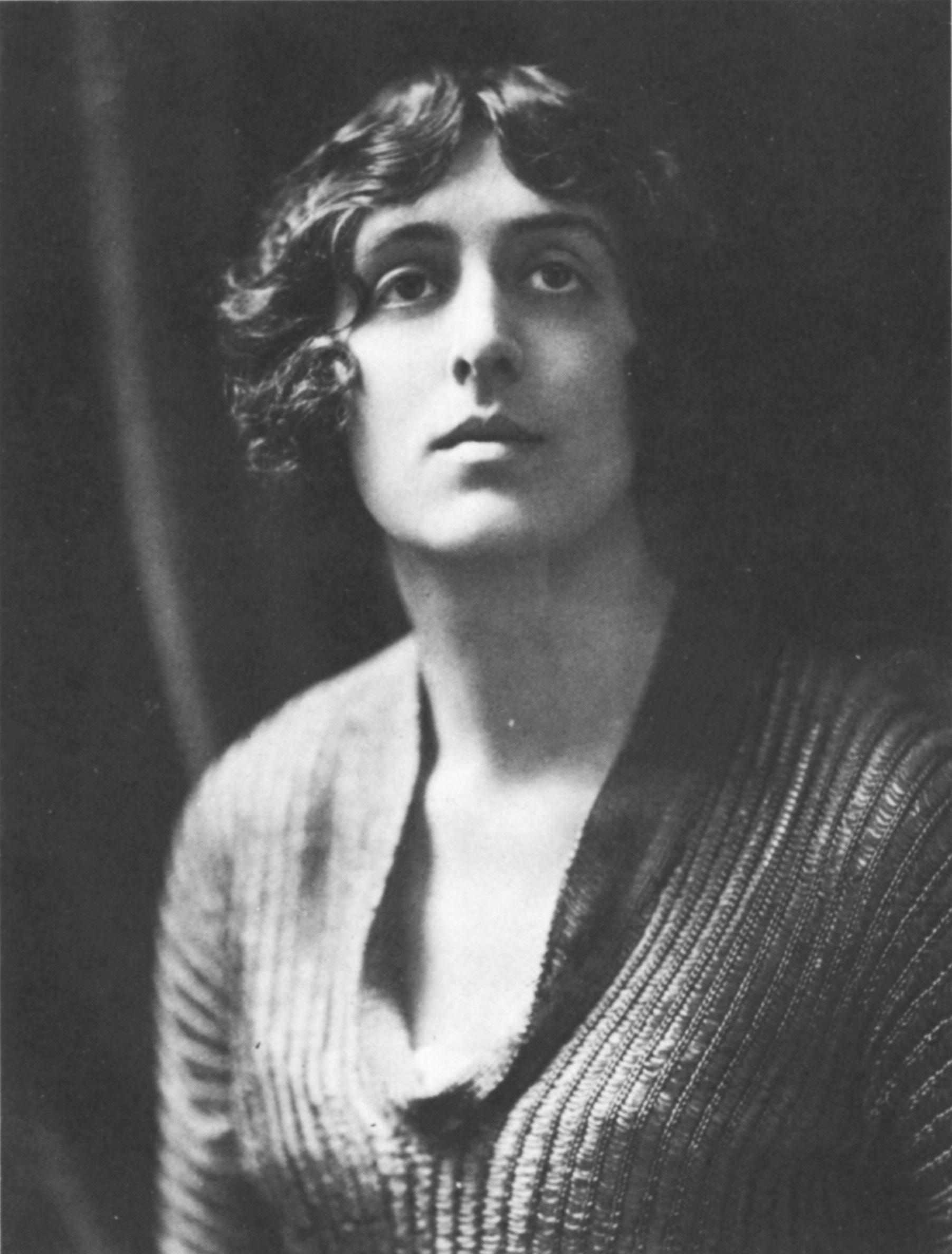
- Sackville-West around 1915, from The Life of V. Sackville-West by Victoria Glendinning
- Born: Victoria Mary Sackville-West; 9 March 1892; Knole House, Kent, England
- Died: 2 June 1962 (aged 70); Sissinghurst Castle, Kent, England
- Occupations: Novelist, poet, garden designer
- Spouse: Sir Harold Nicolson (m. 1913)
- Children: Benedict Nicolson; Nigel Nicolson
- Parents: Lionel Sackville-West, 3rd Baron Sackville (father); Victoria Sackville-West (mother)
- Writing career
- Period: 1917–1960

Victoria Mary, Lady Nicolson, CH (née Sackville-West; 9 March 1892 – 2 June 1962), usually known as Vita Sackville-West, was an English author and garden designer.

Sackville-West was a successful novelist, poet and journalist, as well as a prolific letter writer and diarist. She published more than a dozen collections of poetry and 13 novels during her life. She was twice awarded the Hawthornden Prize for Imaginative Literature: in 1927 for her pastoral epic, The Land, and in 1933 for her Collected Poems. She was the inspiration for the protagonist of Orlando: A Biography, by her friend and lover Virginia Woolf.

She wrote a column in The Observer from 1946 to 1961 and is remembered for the celebrated garden at Sissinghurst in Kent, created with her husband, Sir Harold Nicolson.

== Biography ==
=== Antecedents ===
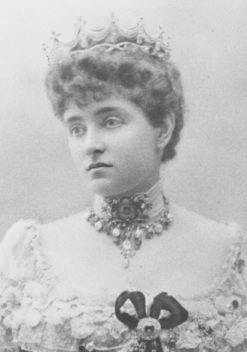
Victoria Josefa Dolores Catalina Sackville-West, Baroness Sackville. Vita's mother, circa 1885

Victoria Mary Sackville-West—called Vita, to distinguish her from her mother—was born on 9 March 1892 at Knole, the Kent home of Sackville-West's aristocratic ancestors. She was the only child of cousins Victoria Sackville-West and Lionel Sackville-West, 3rd Baron Sackville. Vita's mother, the illegitimate daughter of Lionel Sackville-West, 2nd Baron Sackville and the Spanish dancer Pepita (Josefa de Oliva, née Durán y Ortega), had been raised in a Parisian convent.

Although the marriage of Sackville-West's parents was initially happy, the couple drifted apart shortly after her birth. Lionel took a mistress, an opera singer who came to live with them at Knole.

Knole had been given to Thomas Sackville by Elizabeth I, in the sixteenth century. The Sackville-West family followed the English aristocracy's inheritance customs, preventing Vita from inheriting Knole upon the death of her father, which was a source of life-long bitterness for her. (Note: Salic rules of agnatic male primogeniture.) The house followed the title, and her father bequeathed it instead to his brother Charles, who became the 4th Baron.

=== Early life ===
Sackville-West was initially taught at home by governesses and later attended Helen Woolff's school for girls, an exclusive day school in Mayfair, where she met first loves Violet Keppel and Rosamund Grosvenor. She did not befriend local children and found it hard to make friends at school. Her biographers characterise her childhood as one filled by loneliness and isolation. She wrote prolifically at Knole, penning eight full-length (unpublished) novels between 1906 and 1910, ballads and many plays, some in French. Her lack of formal education led to later shyness with her peers, such as those in the Bloomsbury Group. She felt herself to be sluggish of mind and she was never at the intellectual heart of her social group.

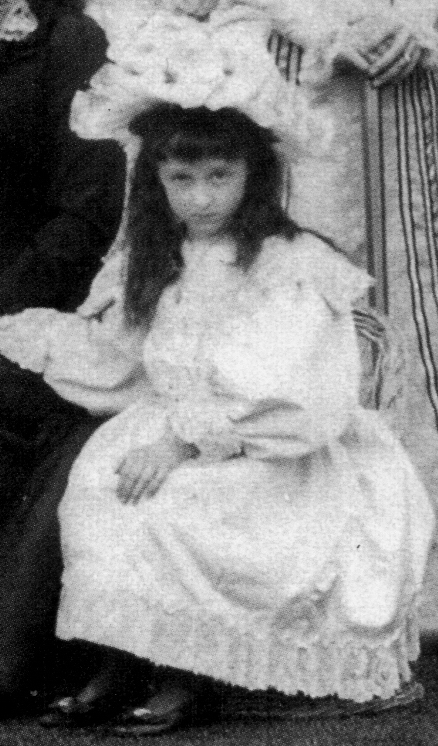
Vita in childhood

Sackville-West's apparently Roma lineage introduced a passion for "gypsy" ways, a culture she perceived to be hot-blooded, heart-led, dark, and romantic. It informed the stormy nature of many of her later love affairs and was a strong theme in her writing. Sackville-West visited Roma camps and felt herself to be at one with them.

Vita's mother had a wide array of famous lovers, including financier J. P. Morgan and Sir John Murray Scott (from 1897 until his death in 1912). Scott, secretary to the couple who inherited and developed the Wallace Collection, was a devoted companion and Lady Sackville and he were rarely apart during their years together. During her childhood, Vita spent a great deal of time in Scott's apartments in Paris, perfecting her already fluent French.

=== First loves ===
Sackville-West was a debutante in 1910. She was wooed by Orazio Pucci di Barsento, son of a distinguished Florentine family; by Lord Granby (later 9th Duke of Rutland); and by Lord Lascelles (later 6th Earl of Harewood), among others. In 1924 she had a passionate affair with historian Geoffrey Scott. Scott's marriage collapsed shortly thereafter, as was often the fallout with Sackville-West's affairs, all with women after this point (as most of them had been beforehand).

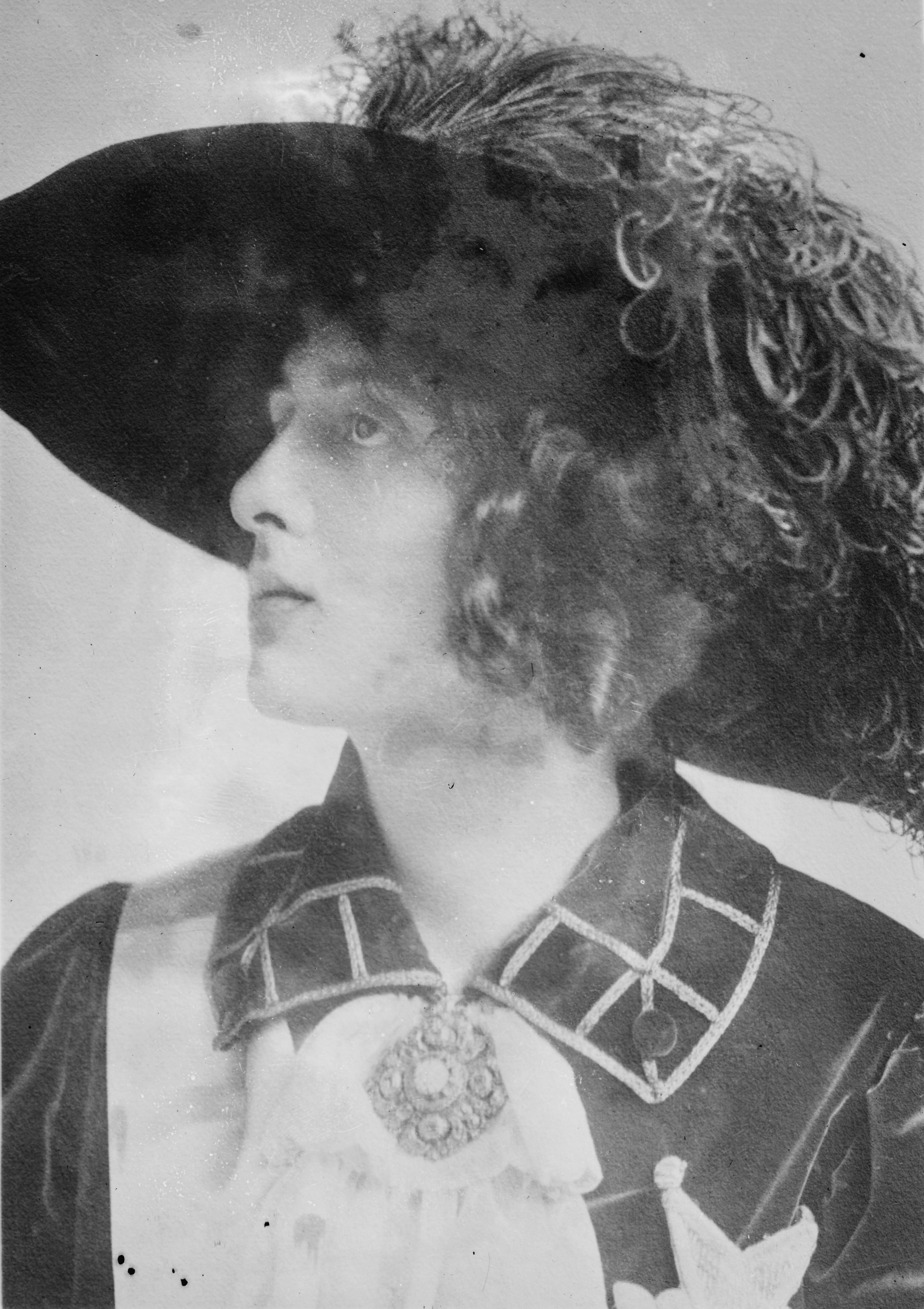
Vita Sackville-West in 1913

Sackville-West fell in love with Rosamund Grosvenor (1888–1944), who was four years her senior. (Note: Rosamund was the daughter of Algernon Henry Grosvenor (1864–1907), and the granddaughter of Robert Grosvenor, 1st Baron Ebury.) In her journal, Vita wrote "Oh, I dare say I realized vaguely that I had no business to sleep with Rosamund, and I should certainly never have allowed anyone to find it out," but she saw no real conflict. Lady Sackville, Vita's mother, invited Rosamund to visit the family at their villa in Monte Carlo (1910). Rosamund also stayed with Vita at Knole, at Murray Scott's pied-à-terre on the Rue Laffitte in Paris, and at Sluie, Scott's shooting lodge in the Scottish Highlands, near Banchory. Their secret relationship ended in 1913 when Vita married.

Sackville-West was more deeply involved with Violet Keppel, daughter of the Hon. George Keppel and his wife, Alice Keppel. The sexual relationship began when they were both in their teens and strongly influenced them for years. Both later married and became writers.

=== Marriage to Harold Nicolson ===
Sackville-West was courted for 18 months by young diplomat Harold Nicolson, whom she found to be a secretive character. She writes that the wooing was entirely chaste and throughout they did not so much as kiss. In 1913, at age 21, Vita married him in the private chapel at Knole. (Note: Nicknamed 'Hadji', or 'Pilgrim', by his father, he was the third son of British diplomat Arthur Nicolson, 1st Baron Carnock.) Vita's parents were opposed to the marriage on the grounds that "penniless" Nicolson had an annual income of only £250. He was the third secretary at the British Embassy in Constantinople at the time. Another of Sackville-West's suitors, Lord Granby, had an annual income of £100,000, owned vast acres of land and was heir to an old title, Duke of Rutland.

The couple had an open marriage. Both Sackville-West and her husband had same-sex relationships before and during their marriage, as did some of the Bloomsbury Group of writers and artists, with whom they had connections. Sackville-West saw herself as psychologically divided into two: one side of her personality was more feminine, soft, submissive, and attracted to men while the other side was more masculine, hard, aggressive, and attracted to women.

Vita Sackville-West in 1916

Following the pattern of his father's career, Harold Nicolson was at various times a diplomat, journalist, broadcaster, Member of Parliament, and author of biographies and novels. After the wedding the couple lived in Cihangir, a suburb of Constantinople (now Istanbul), the capital of the Ottoman Empire. Sackville-West loved Constantinople, but the duties of a diplomat's wife did not appeal to her. It was only during this time that she attempted to don, with good grace, the part of a "correct and adoring wife of the brilliant young diplomat", as she sarcastically wrote. When she became pregnant, in the summer of 1914, the couple returned to England to ensure that she could give birth in a British hospital.

The family lived at 182 Ebury Street, Belgravia and bought Long Barn in Kent as a country house (1915–1930). They employed the architect Edwin Lutyens to make improvements to the house. The British declaration of war on the Ottoman Empire in November 1914, following Ottoman naval attacks on Russia, precluded any return to Constantinople.

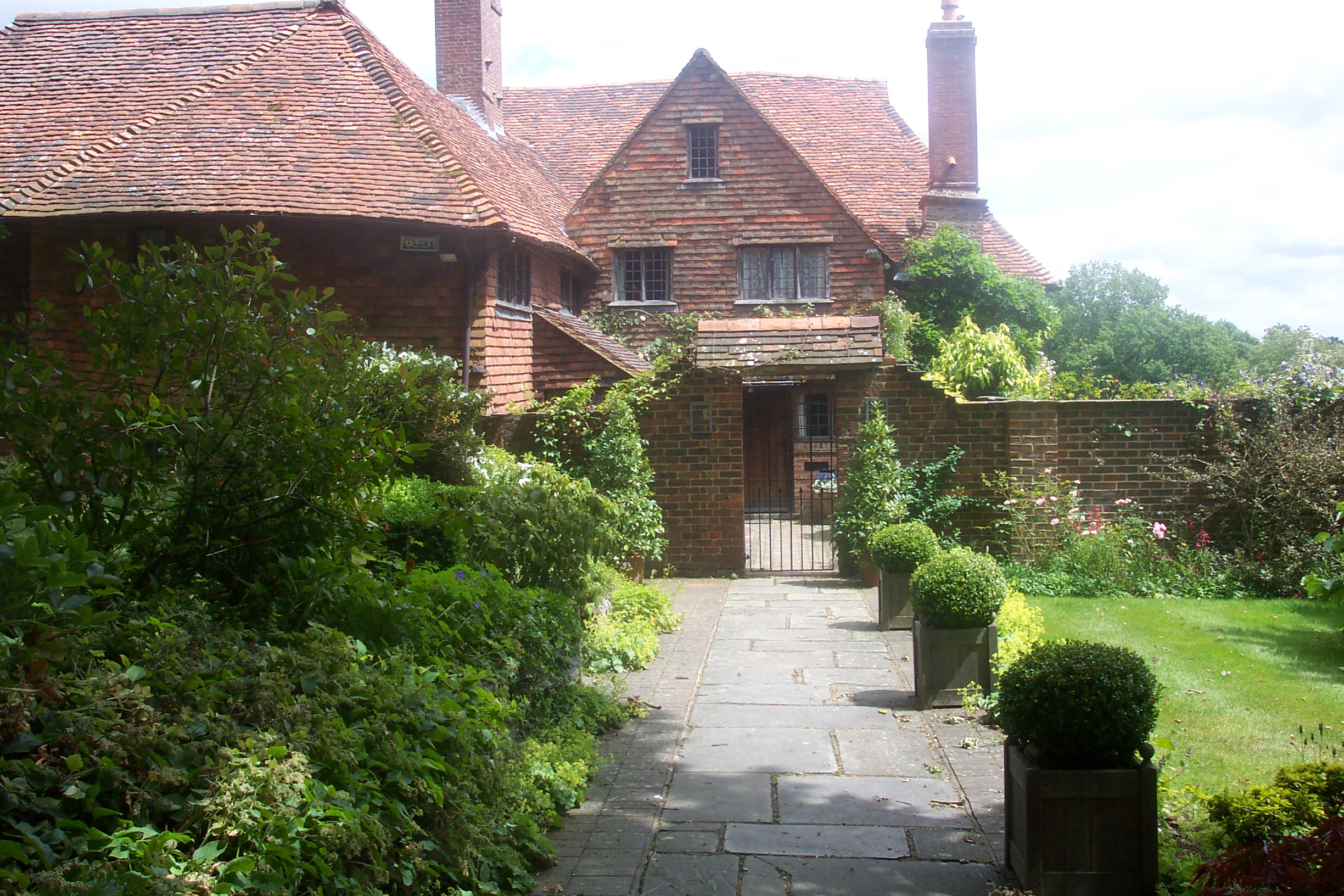
Long Barn, Kent

The couple had two children: Benedict (1914–1978), an art historian, and Nigel (1917–2004), a well-known editor, politician, and writer. Another son was stillborn in 1915.

=== Relationship with Violet Keppel ===
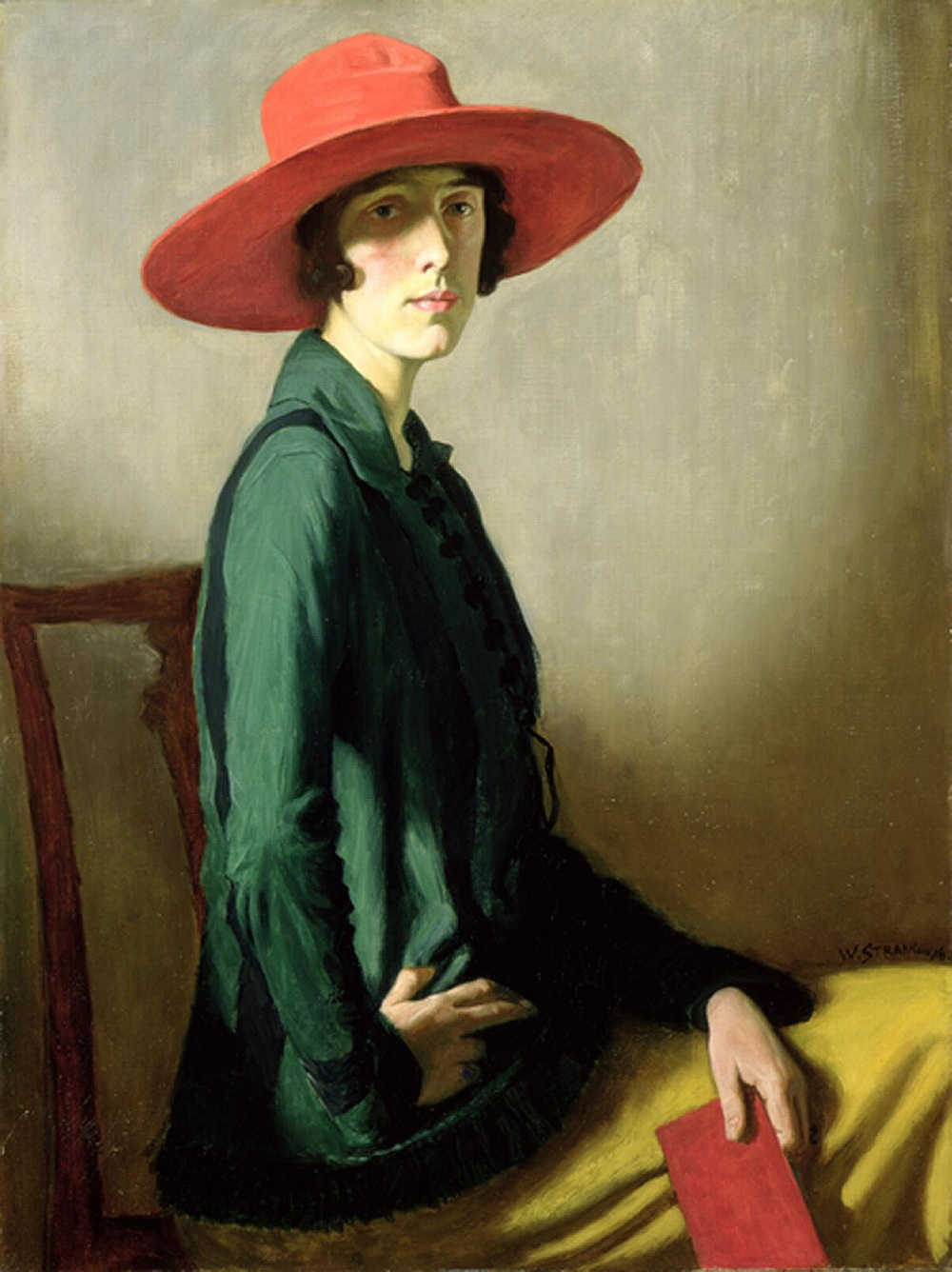
Vita Sackville-West in her twenties, by William Strang, 1918

Sackville-West continued to receive devoted letters from her lover Violet Keppel. She was deeply upset to read of Keppel's engagement to Major Denys Trefusis. Her response was to travel to Paris to see Keppel and persuade her to honour their commitment. Keppel, depressed and suicidal, did eventually marry her fiancé, under pressure from her mother, though Keppel made it clear that she did not love her husband. Sackville-West called the marriage her own greatest failure.

Violet in 1920

Sackville-West and Keppel disappeared together several times from 1918 on, mostly to France. One day in 1918 Vita writes that she experienced a radical 'liberation', where her male aspect was unexpectedly freed. She writes: "I went into wild spirits; I ran, I shouted, I jumped, I climbed, I vaulted over gates, I felt like a schoolboy let out on a holiday ... that wild irresponsible day".

The mothers of both women joined forces to sabotage the relationship and force their daughters back to their husbands. But they were unsuccessful. Sackville-West often dressed as a man, styled as Keppel's husband. The two women made a bond to remain faithful to one another, pledging that neither would engage in sexual relations with their husbands. (Note: In a letter to Nicolson dated 1 June 1919 explaining why she would not leave Keppel, Sackville-West wrote: I never ought to have married you or anybody else; I ought just to have lived with you for as long as you wanted me... I ought never to have married til I was thirty. I really think that is the best solution for people like me... Women ought to have the freedom the same as men when they are young. It's a rotten and ridiculous system at present, it's simply cheating one of one's youth. It was all right for the Victorians. But this generation is discarding, and next will have discarded, the chrysalis.)

Keppel continued to pursue her lover to great lengths, until Sackville-West's affairs with other women finally took their toll. In November 1919, while staying at Monte Carlo, Sackville-West wrote that she felt very low, entertaining thoughts of suicide, believing that Nicolson would be better off without her. In 1920 the lovers ran off again to France together and their husbands chased after them in a small two-seater aeroplane. Sackville-West heard allegations that Keppel and her husband Trefusis had been involved sexually, and she broke off the relationship as the lesbian oath of fidelity had been broken. Despite the rift, the two women stayed devoted to one another.

=== Persia ===
From 1925 to 1927, Nicolson lived in Tehran where Sackville-West often visited him. Sackville-West's book A Passenger to Tehran recounts her time there. The couple were involved in planning the coronation of Rezā Khan and got to know the six-year old Crown Prince Mohammad Reza well. She also visited and wrote about the former capital of Isfahan to see the Safavid palaces.

=== Relationship with Virginia Woolf ===
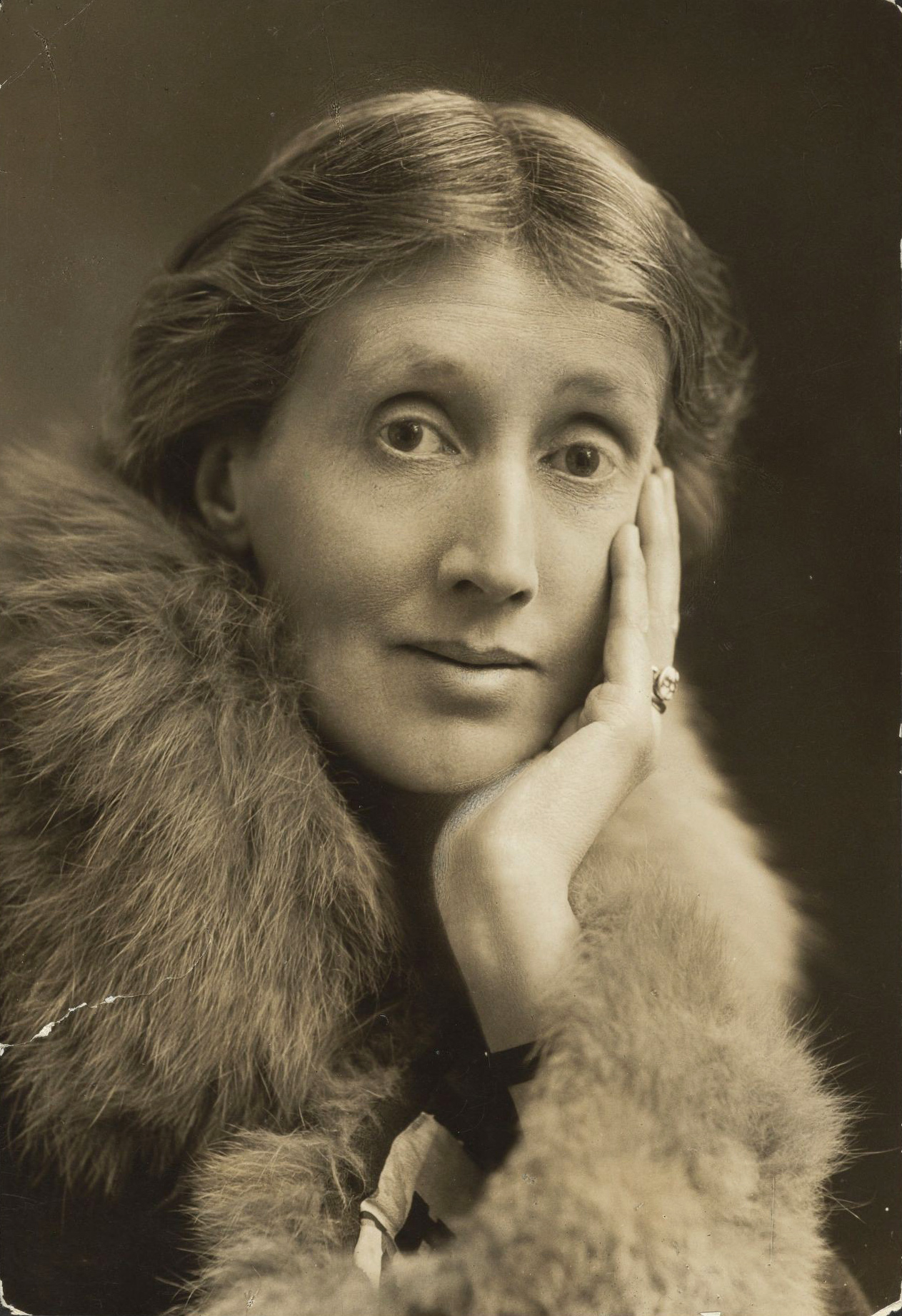
Portrait photograph of Virginia Woolf, 1927

Sackville-West's relationship with the prominent writer Virginia Woolf began in 1925 and ended in 1935, reaching its height between 1925 and 1928. The American scholar Louise DeSalvo wrote that the ten years while they were together were the artistic peak of both women's careers, owing to the positive influence they had on one another: "neither had ever written so much so well, and neither would ever again reach this peak of accomplishment". (Note: In a letter to her son, Nigel Nicolson (Portrait of A Marriage), Vita Sackville-West wrote that the physical component of her famous affair with Virginia Woolf had consisted of two occasions when they went to bed together and even then, they may have only engaged in "bundling", since Vita was aware of Woolf's extreme emotional fragility and did not want to cause her a mental breakdown with a tempestuously sexual affair.)

In December 1922, Sackville-West first met Virginia Woolf at a dinner party in London. Though Sackville-West came from an aristocratic family that was far richer than Woolf's own, the women bonded over their confined childhoods and emotionally absent parents. Woolf knew about Sackville-West's relationship with Keppel and was impressed by her free spirit. (Note: Leonard Woolf wrote "She [Sackville-West] belonged indeed to a world which was completely different from ours, and the long line of Sackvilles, Dorsets, Da La Warrs and Knole with its 365 rooms had put into her mind and heart an ingredient which was alien to us and at first made intimacy difficult".) (Note: Woolf wrote about meeting Sackville-West in 1925: "Vita shines in the grocer's shop in Sevenoaks ... pink growing, grape clustered, pearl hung ... There is her maturity and full-breastedness; her being so much full in sail on the high tides, where I am coasting down backwaters; her capacity I mean to take the floor in any company, to represent her country, to visit Chatsworth, to control silver, servants, chow dogs, her motherhood ... her in short being (what I have never been) a real woman".)

Sackville-West greatly admired Woolf's writings, considering her to be the better author. She told Woolf in one letter: "I contrast my illiterate writing with your scholarly one, and I am ashamed". Though Woolf envied Sackville-West's ability to write quickly, she was inclined to believe that the volumes were written too much in haste: "Vita's prose is too fluent". (Note: Before going on her second trip to Persia in 1927, a chastened Sackville-West wrote to Woolf: "I shall work so hard [on the next book], partly to please you and partly to please myself ... I treasure your sudden discourse on literature yesterday morning, a send-off to me, rather like Polonius to Laertes. It is quite true that you have had infinitely more influence on me intellectually than anyone else, and for this alone, I love you ... You do like me to write well, don't you? And I do hate writing badly--and having written so badly in the past. But now, like Queen Victoria, I will be good".)

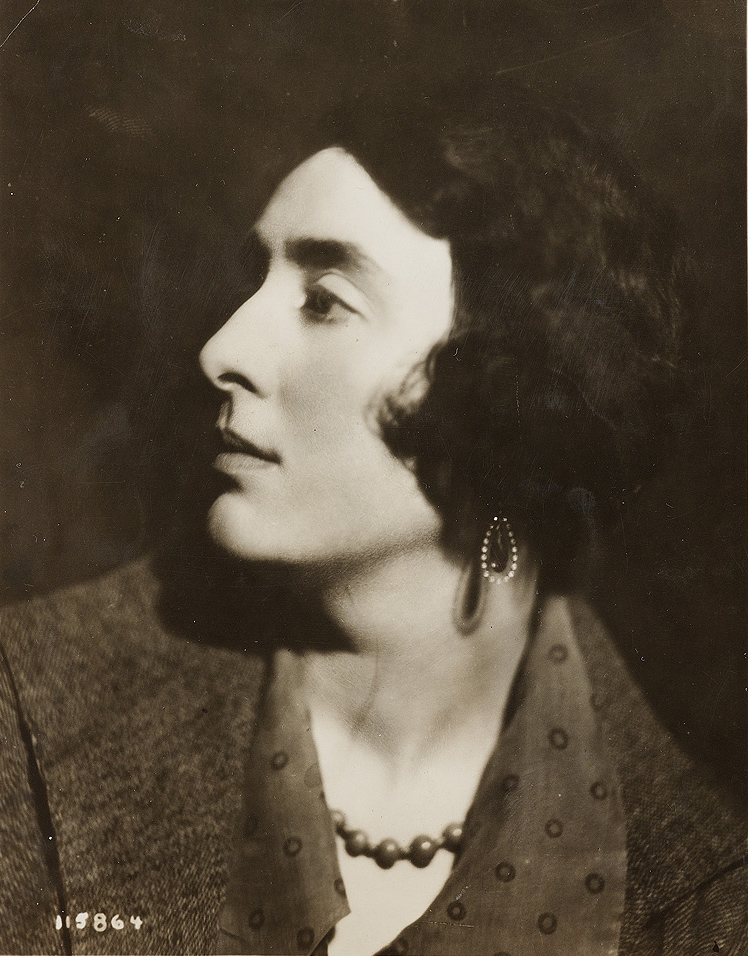
Sackville-West, 1926

As the two grew close, Woolf disclosed that as a child she had been abused by her step-brother. (Note: A somber Sackville-West wrote in her diary: "After dinner, V.[irgina] read me her memoir of Old Bloomsbury and talked a lot about her brother".) It was largely due to Sackville-West's support that Woolf began to heal from the trauma, allowing her for the first time to have a satisfying erotic relationship. (Note: Woolf told Sackville-West that she was the first person who had caused her to orgasm.) Woolf purchased a mirror during a trip to France with Sackville-West, saying she felt she could look in a mirror for the first time in her life. Sackville-West's support gave Woolf greater confidence and helped her cast off her self-image of a sickly semi-recluse. She persuaded Woolf that her nervous ailments had been misdiagnosed, and that she should focus on her own varied intellectual projects; that she must learn to rest. (Note: In 1925, Sackville-West wrote to Woolf: "Why do you give so much of your energies to the manuscripts of other people? You told me in London that you had at least six novels in your head but were being severe with yourself until you should go to Rodmell. Now you are at Rodmell and what of the six novels? Between Ottoline, Gertrude Stein, and bridal parties which cause you to faint, what time is there for Virginia?")

To help the Woolfs, Sackville-West chose their Hogarth Press to be her publisher. Seducers in Ecuador, the first Sackville-West novel to be published by Hogarth, sold only 1,500 copies in its first year. The Edwardians, published next, sold 30,000 copies in its first six months. The boost helped Hogarth financially, though Woolf did not always value the books' romantic themes. The increased security of the Press's fortunes allowed Woolf to write more experimental novels such as The Waves. Though contemporary critics consider Woolf a better writer, critics in the 1920s viewed Sackville-West as more accomplished, with her books outselling Woolf's by a large margin. (Note: The extent to which Hogarth depended upon Sackville-West to stay in business was reflected in a letter Woolf sent her on 7 September 1930 saying: "What about your novel and your poems? I ask in no idle curiosity; I look upon you now as the Woolf bread-winner since I am more and more certain that my next novel won't win us even the penny bun".)

Sackville-West loved to travel, frequently going to France, Spain and to visit Nicolson in Persia. These trips were emotionally draining for Woolf, who missed Sackville-West intensely. Woolf's novel To the Lighthouse, noteworthy for its theme of longing for someone absent, was partly inspired by Sackville-West's frequent absences. Sackville-West inspired Woolf to write one of her most famous novels, Orlando, featuring a protagonist who changes sex over the centuries. This work was described by Sackville-West's son Nigel Nicolson as "the longest and most charming love-letter in literature."

There were, however, tensions in the relationship. Woolf was often bothered by what she viewed as Sackville-West's promiscuity, charging that Sackville-West's great need for sex led her to take up with anyone who struck her fancy. In A Room of One's Own (1929), Woolf attacks patriarchal inheritance laws. This was an implicit criticism of Sackville-West, who never questioned the leading social and political position of the aristocracy to which she belonged. She felt that Sackville-West was unable to critique the system she was both a part of and, to a certain extent, a victim of. In the 1930s they clashed over Nicolson's "unfortunate" involvement with Oswald Mosley and the New Party (later renamed the British Union of Fascists), (Note: An angry Woolf wrote to Sackville-West in August 1931: "Potto [their name for sex] expiring. What about Harold and Mosley? But don't write if it hurts".) and they were at odds over the imminent war. Sackville-West supported rearmament while Woolf remained loyal to her pacifism; this contributed to the distancing of their relationship in 1935.

My friendship to Vita is over. Not with a quarrel, not with a bang, but as ripe fruit falls. But her voice saying 'Virginia?' outside the tower room was as enchanting as ever. Only then nothing happened.

— Virginia Woolf's diary, dated 11 March 1935

However, the two women reconnected in 1937 and remained close until Woolf's death in 1941.

Your friendship means so much to me. In fact it is one of the major things in my life

— Letter from Vita Sackville-West to Virginia Woolf, dated 24 April 1940

=== Other lovers ===
One of Sackville-West's male suitors, Henry Lascelles, would later marry the Princess Royal and become the 6th Earl of Harewood.

In 1927, Sackville-West had an affair with Mary Garman, a member of the Bloomsbury Group; between 1929 and 1931, she maintained a relationship with Hilda Matheson, head of the BBC Talks Department. In 1931, Sackville-West was in a ménage à trois with journalist Evelyn Irons and Irons's lover, Olive Rinder. Irons had interviewed Sackville-West after her novel The Edwardians had become a best-seller.

== Sissinghurst ==
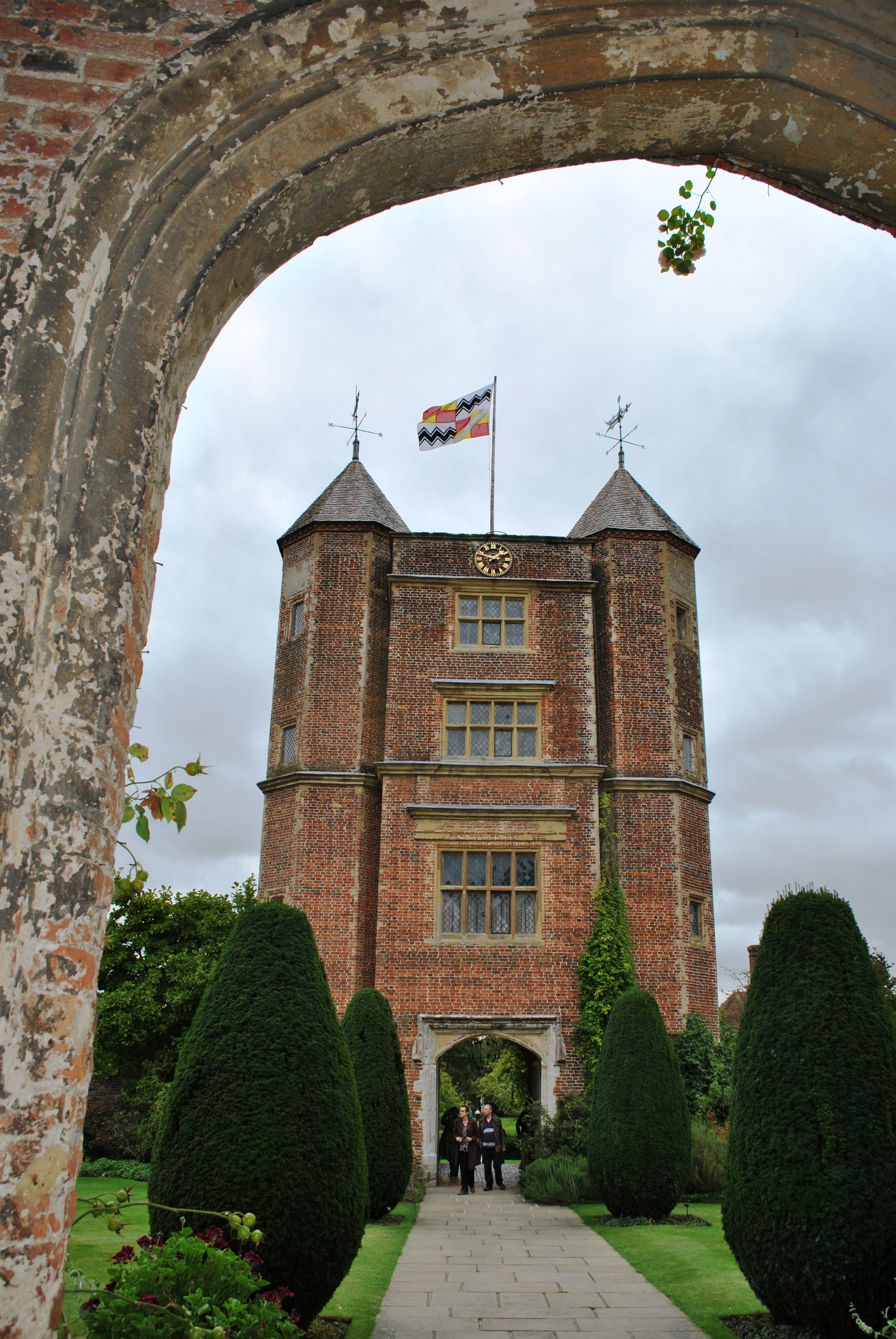
Sissinghurst Castle Garden, Kent

In 1930 the family acquired and moved to Sissinghurst Castle, near Cranbrook, Kent. It had once been owned by Vita's ancestors. This gave it a dynastic attraction as she was excluded from inheriting Knole and a title. Sissinghurst was an Elizabethan ruin and the creation of the gardens would be a joint labour of love that would last many decades, first entailing years of clearing debris from the land. Nicolson provided the architectural structure, with strong classical lines, which would frame his wife's innovative informal planting schemes. She created a new and experimental system of enclosures or rooms, such as the White Garden, Rose Garden, Orchard, Cottage Garden and Nuttery. She also innovated single colour-themed gardens and design principles orientating the visitors' experience to discovery and exploration. Her first garden at Long Barn (Kent, 1915–1930) was experimental, a place of learning by trial and error and she carried over her ideas and projects to Sissinghurst, using her hard won experience. Sissinghurst was first opened to the public in 1938.

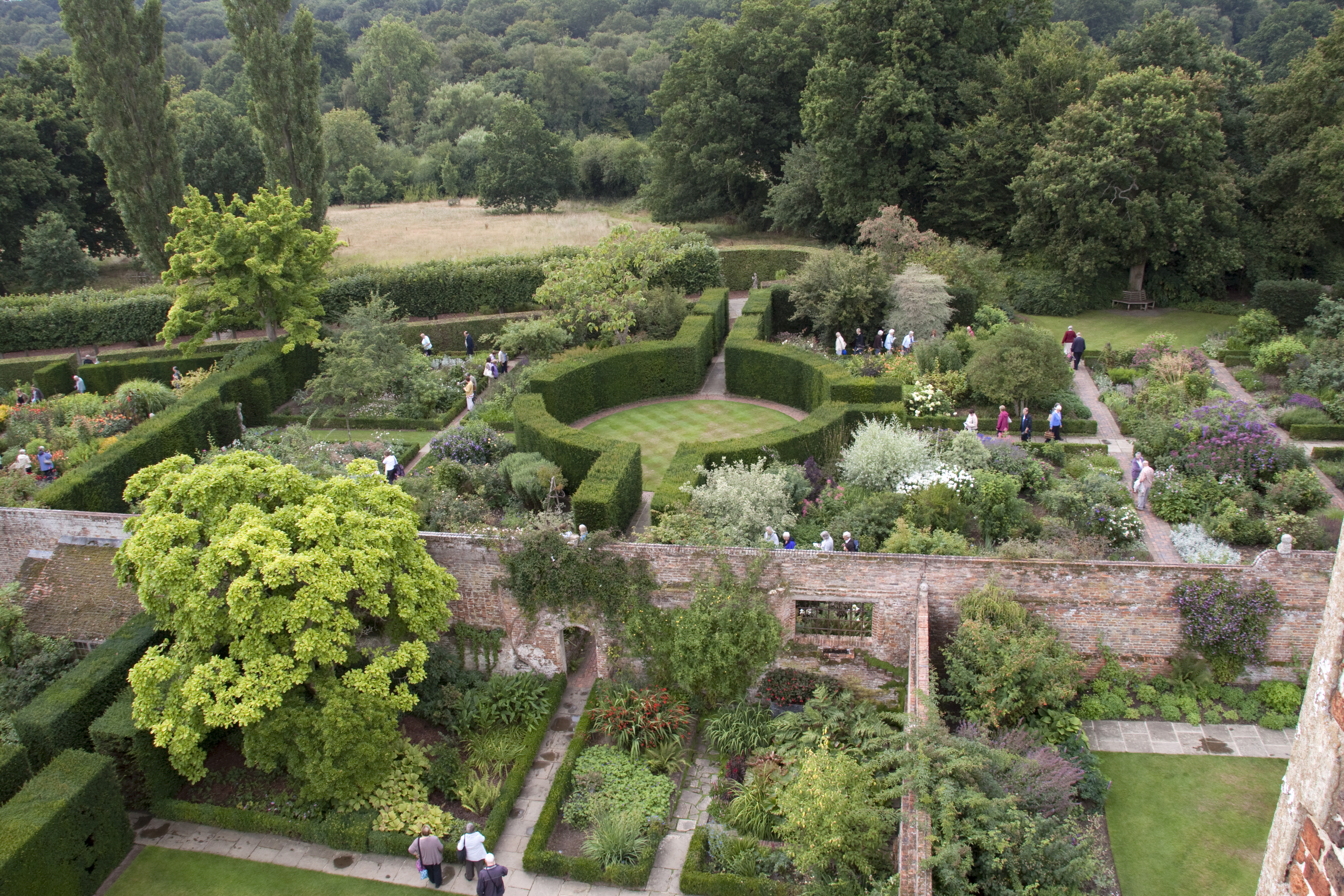
Sissinghurst

Sackville-West took up writing again in 1930 after a six-year break as she needed money to pay for Sissinghurst. Nicolson, having left the Foreign Office, no longer had a diplomat's salary to draw upon. She also had to pay tuition for her two sons to attend Eton College. She felt she had become a better writer thanks to the mentorship of Woolf. In 1947 she began a weekly column in The Observer called "In your Garden", although she was not a trained horticulturist or designer. She continued the very popular column until a year before her death, and writing helped to make Sissinghurst one of the most famous and visited gardens in England. In 1948 she became a founder member of the National Trust's garden committee. The grounds are now run by the National Trust. She was awarded the Veitch Memorial Medal from the Royal Horticultural Society.

== Writing ==
=== Portrait of a Marriage ===
In the early 1920s Sackville-West wrote a memoir of her relationships. In it she sought to explain both why she had chosen to stay with Nicolson and why she had fallen in love with Violet Keppel. The work, titled Portrait of a Marriage, was not published until 1973. In the book she uses metaphors from nature to present her account as truthful and honest, describing her life as a "bog" and a "swamp", suggesting that her personal life was naturally unappealing and unpleasant. Sackville-West stated that she wanted to explain her sexuality, which she presented as being at the core of her personality. She wrote that in the future "it will be recognized that many more people of my type do exist than under the present-day system of hypocrisy is commonly admitted".

Reflecting a certain ambivalence about her sexuality, Sackville-West presented her sexual desires for Keppel as both "deviant" and "natural", as if she herself was uncertain of whether her sexuality was normal or not, though the American scholar Georgia Johnston has argued that Sackville-West's confusion on this point was due to her wish to have this memoir published one day. In this regard, Sackville-West wrote of her deep desire and love for Keppel while at same time declaring her "shame" about this "duality with which I was too weak and too self-indulgent to struggle". At various times, Sackville-West called herself a "pariah" with a "perverted nature" and "unnatural" feelings for Keppel, who was portrayed as a tempting, if degrading, object of her desire. Sackville-West called for a "spirit of candor" in society that would allow for tolerance of gay and bisexual people. Much influenced by the theories promoted by sexologists like Magnus Hirschfeld, Edward Carpenter, Richard von Krafft-Ebing, Havelock Ellis and Sigmund Freud, Sackville-West sometimes wrote of her sexuality as abnormal and wrong and due to some psychological flaw she was born with, portraying heterosexuality as the norm that she wanted, but failed to live up to.

Several times, Sackville-West stated that she wrote Portrait of a Marriage for scientific purposes so people would be able to understand bisexual people, which would thus allow her, despite her self-condemnation, to present her sexuality as in some way normal. Several of the sexologists Sackville-West cited, most notably Carpenter and Ellis, had argued that homosexuality and bisexuality were in fact normal, and despite her condemning herself, her use of a "scientific" approach backed up with quotes from Ellis and Carpenter allowed her to present her bisexuality as implicitly normal. Writing in the third person, Sackville-West declared "she regrets that the person Harold married wasn't entirely and wholly what he had thought of her, and that the person who loves and owns Violet isn't a second person, because each suits each other". Sackville-West presented her sexuality as part of the personality she had been born with, portraying herself as an accursed woman who should be the object of sympathy, not condemnation.

In 1973, when her son Nigel Nicolson published Portrait of a Marriage, he was uncertain if he was going to be charged with obscenity, going to considerable lengths to stress the legitimacy of a love for a person of the same sex in his introduction. Despite portraying herself as in some way "deviant" because of her feelings for women, Sackville-West also wrote in Portrait of a Marriage of the discovery and acceptance of her bisexuality as a teenager as the joyous "liberation of half my personality", suggesting that she did not really see herself as a woman with "deviant" sexuality, as this statement contradicted what she had written at the beginning of the book about her "perverted" sexuality. Johnson wrote that Sackville-West, in presenting the lesbian side of herself in terms that depicted Keppel as evil and Nicolson as good, was the only way possible at the time to express this side of her personality, writing "even if annihilating herself seemed the only way she could present any type of acceptable self."

The memoir was dramatised by the BBC (and PBS in North America) in 1990, starring Janet McTeer as Vita, and Cathryn Harrison as Violet. The series won four BAFTAs.

=== Challenge ===
Sackville-West's novel Challenge (1923) also bears witness to her affair with Keppel: Sackville-West and Keppel had started writing this book as a collaborative endeavour. It was published in America but banned in the UK until 1974.

The male character's name, Julian, had been Sackville-West's nickname when passing as a man. Challenge (first entitled Rebellion, then Enchantment, then Vanity and at some point Foam), is a roman à clef with the character of Julian being a male version of Sackville-West and Eve, the woman he desires so passionately is Keppel. Notably, Sackville-West in Challenge defends Keppel against several of the insults Nicolson had applied to her in his letters to her; for example Nicolson often called Keppel a "swine" and a "pig", and in the book Julian goes out of his way to say that Eve is neither a swine nor a pig. In the book, Julian says that "Eve is not a 'little swine', she just has the weaknesses and faults of femininity carried to the 9th degree, but is also redeemed by a self-sacrifice, which is very feminine".

Reflecting her obsession with the Romani people, Eve is portrayed as a seductive Romani woman with an "insinuating femininity" that Julian cannot resist, calling him away from his political mission of winning independence on a fictional Greek island during the Greek war of independence. Nicolson wrote in a letter to his wife: "Don't please dedicate it to Violet, it would kill me if you did". When Challenge was published in 1924, the dedication was written in Romani reading: "This book is yours, honoured witch. If you read it, you will find your tormented soul changed and free". Throughout their relationship, Keppel was given to threatening suicide if Sackville-West left her, a character trait shared by Eve, who finally drowns herself by walking in the sea when Julian is aboard a boat and too far off to hear her calling for him. The book's ending reflected Sackville-West's guilt about breaking her relationship with Keppel.

Her mother, Lady Sackville, found the portrayal obvious enough to refuse to allow publication of the novel in England; but Vita's son Nigel Nicolson praises his mother: "She fought for the right to love, men and women, rejecting the conventions that marriage demands exclusive love, and that women should love only men, and men only women. For this she was prepared to give up everything ... How could she regret that the knowledge of it should now reach the ears of a new generation, one so infinitely more compassionate than her own?"

Sackville-West was fascinated with and often wrote about the Roma people. As the British scholar Kirstie Blair noted, for her: "Gypsies represent liberation, excitement, danger and the free expression of sexuality". In particular, the Roma women, especially Spanish Romani women, served as a symbol for female homosexuality in her writings. As with many other female writers in this period, for Sackville-West, the Romani represented a social element both familiar and strange; a people perceived and admired as flamboyant romantics while at the same time viewed and hated as shifty, dishonest types; a rootless people who belonged nowhere yet could be found everywhere in Europe, serving as a symbol for a sort of unconventional femininity. The picture Sackville-West held of the Romani was much influenced by orientalism, as the Romani were believed to have originated from India. The idea of a people who belonged nowhere, existing outside of the values of "civilization", held genuine appeal to her as it offered up the possibility of gender roles different from those held in the West. Sackville-West was English, but she invented Romani ancestry for herself on the Spanish side of her family, explaining her bohemian behaviour as due to her alleged "Gypsy" descent.

=== Orlando ===
Woolf was inspired by Sackville-West to write her novel Orlando (1928), featuring a protagonist who changes sex over the centuries. (Note: Woolf documented the moment of the conception of Orlando: she wrote in her diary on 5 October 1927: "And instantly the usual exciting devices enter my mind: a biography beginning in the year 1500 and continuing to the present day, called Orlando: Vita; only with a change about from one sex to the other" (excerpt from her diary published posthumously by her husband Leonard Woolf).) (Note: Woolf felt she needed Sackville-West's permission to write Orlando, asking in a letter: "But listen, suppose Orlando turns out to be Vita and its all about you and the lusts of your flesh and the lure of your mind ... Do you mind, say Yes or No?") Reflecting Sackville-West's interest in the Romani, when Orlando goes to bed as a man and mysteriously wakes up as a woman in Constantinople (which is implied might have been the result of a spell cast by a Romani witch whom he married), it is at a Romani camp in the Balkans that Orlando is first welcomed and accepted as a woman, as the Romani in the novel make no distinctions between the sexes. Ultimately Woolf satirizes Sackville-West's Romani fetish, as Orlando, an English aristocrat, prefers not to live in poverty as part of wandering Romani caravan in the Balkans, because the call of a settled life of the aristocracy at a country house in England proves too strong for her, just as in real life Sackville-West fantasised about living the nomadic life of a Romani, but in reality preferred the settled life in the English countryside. Orlando, which was intended as a fantasy where the character of Orlando (a stand-in for Sackville-West) inherits an estate, not unlike Knole (which Sackville-West would have inherited as the eldest child if she had been a man), ironically marked the beginning of a tension between the two women. Sackville-West often complained in her letters that Woolf was more interested in writing a fantasy about her than in returning her gestures of affection in the real world. (Note: After finishing Orlando, Woolf wrote a letter to Sackville-West saying: "For Promiscuous you are and that is all to be said about it. Look in the Index of Orlando-after Pippin and see what comes next-Promiscuity passim". In another letter, Woolf warned Sackville-West: "Yes, you are an agile animal-no doubt about it-but as to your gambols being diverting ... I'm not so sure ... I'm a fair-minded woman. You only be careful with your gamboling or you'll find Virginia's soft crevices lined with hooks".)

=== Family History ===
Sackville-West's 1932 novel Family History tells the story of Evelyn Jarrold, a rich widow who married into a family which owes its recent wealth and social position to the ownership of coal mines, and her ill-fated love affair with Miles Vane-Merrick, a much younger man with progressive social ideas. Evelyn Jarrold's husband, Tommy, died in the Great War, and she has nothing to occupy her apart from her son Dan (the Jarrolds' heir, who is away at Eton), social events, and visits to her dressmaker. Vane-Merrick is a farming landowner and Member of Parliament, and is writing a book on economics. He represents new, progressive values and the male world of work and economic activity, and Evelyn Jarrold represents traditional values and the female world of family ties and social engagements.

The characters of Viola and Leonard Anquetil in Family History are socialists, pacifists and feminists, thinly veiled versions of Virginia and Leonard Woolf. In Orlando, Woolf allowed Vita to finally "own" Knole, and in Family History, Vita returns the gesture, as the Anquetils have children who turned out to be intelligent and decent people. Woolf had never had children and was afraid that she would have been a bad mother. In casting her fictional alter-ego as an excellent mother she was offering a "gift" to Woolf.

=== Other work and achievements ===
Most of the novels were an immediate success (except Dark Island, Grand Canyon and La Grande Mademoiselle). All Passion Spent (1931) and Seducers in Ecuador (1924) sold especially well. Somewhat ironically Seducers overtook her mentor's novel Mrs Dalloway at the top of the sales charts.

The Edwardians (1930) and All Passion Spent are perhaps her best-known novels today. In the latter, the elderly Lady Slane courageously embraces a long-suppressed sense of freedom and whimsy after a life-time of following convention. This novel was dramatised by the BBC in 1986 starring Dame Wendy Hiller. All Passion Spent appears to reflect Woolf's influence. The character of Lady Slane begins to truly live only after the death of her husband, a former prime minister. She befriends the servants of her estate, discovering the lives of people she had previously ignored. At the end of the novel Lady Slane persuades her granddaughter to break off an arranged marriage in order to pursue her career as a musician.

Grand Canyon (1942) is a science fiction "cautionary tale" (as she termed it) about a Nazi invasion of an unprepared United States. The book takes an unsuspected twist, however, that makes it something more than a typical invasion yarn.

A recently rediscovered work from 1922 "A Note of Explanation" was written specifically to be a part of the miniature collection of books within the doll's House, and tells the story of a sprite that inhabits the doll's house and re-tells several fairy tales from the point of view of the sprite, indicating how they had influenced the story. The book was adapted for the stage by Emily Ingram under the title "A Sprite in the Doll's House" in 2019 and was performed in Edinburgh, at the Palace of Holyrood House as part of their Christmas festivities.

The poetry remains the least known of Sackville-West's work. It encompassed epics and translations of volumes such as Rilke's Duino Elegies. Her epic poems The Land (1926) and The Garden (1946) reflect an enduring passion for the earth and family tradition.The Land may have been written in response to the central work of Modernist poetry The Waste Land (also published by Hogarth Press). She dedicated her poem to her lover Dorothy Wellesley. A recording of Sackville-West reading it was released by the British Columbia label. Her poem won the Hawthornden Prize in 1927. She won it again in 1933 with her Collected Poems, becoming the only writer to do so twice. The Garden won the Heinemann Award for literature.

Her epic poem Solitude, published by the Hogarth Press in October 1938 contains references to the Bible, Paracelsus, Ixion, Catullus, Andromeda, the Iliad and a Sabine bride, all of which were quite acceptable in the early 20th century, but were seen as anachronistic by 1938. The narrator of Solitude has an ardent love of the English countryside. Though the sex of the narrator is left ambiguous, implied at various points to be a man or a woman, it is made clear the narrator loved intensely a woman who is no longer present and who is deeply missed. At one point, the narrator's horror and disgust at Ixion, a brutal rapist, implies that she is a woman. At another point in the poem, her desire to free Andromeda from her chains and to make love suggests that she is a lesbian. The narrator compares the love of nature to the love of books, as both cultivate her mind. She thinks of herself as superior to the farmers who merely work the land without the time or the interest for poetry, all of which make it possible for her to have a deeper appreciation of nature.

She is not well known as a biographer. The most famous of those works is her biography of Saint Joan of Arc in the work of the same name. Additionally, she composed a dual biography of Saint Teresa of Ávila and Thérèse of Lisieux entitled The Eagle and the Dove, a biography of the author Aphra Behn, and a biography of her maternal grandmother, the Spanish dancer known as Pepita.

Despite being a shy woman, Sackville-West often forced herself to participate in literary readings before book clubs and on the BBC in order to feel a sense of belonging. Her love of the classical traditions in literature put her out of favour with modernist critics and by the 1940s, she was often dismissed as a dated writer, much to her chagrin. In 1947 Sackville-West was made a Fellow of the Royal Society of Literature and a Member of the Order of the Companions of Honour.

== Death and legacy ==
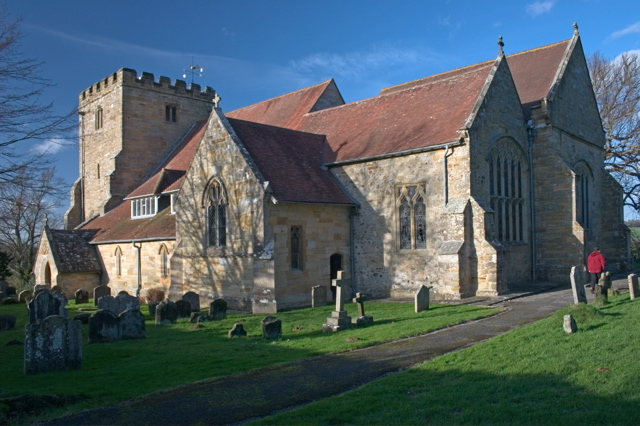
St Michael and All Angels Church, Withyham, where Sackville-West's ashes are buried

Vita Sackville-West died at Sissinghurst in June 1962, aged 70, from abdominal cancer. She was cremated and ashes buried in the family crypt within the church at Withyham, East Sussex.

Sissinghurst Castle is owned by the National Trust. Her son Nigel Nicolson lived there after her death, and following his death in 2004 his own son Adam Nicolson, Baron Carnock, came to live there with his family. With his wife, the horticulturalist Sarah Raven, they committed to restoring the mixed working farm and to growing food on the property for residents and visitors, a function that had withered under the aegis of the Trust.

The film Vita and Virginia, with Gemma Arterton as Vita and Elizabeth Debicki as Virginia, had its world premiere at the 2018 Toronto International Film Festival. It is directed by Chanya Button and based on a play by Eileen Atkins, created from the love letters between Sackville-West and Woolf. The play was first performed in London in October 1993 and off Broadway in November 1994.

== Works ==
=== Fiction ===
==== Poetry ====
In her poetry, she often engaged themes of natural life and romantic love. She published more than a dozen collections of poetry during her life, listed here:

- Timgad: [a poem] (1900)
- Constantinople: eight poems (1915)
- Poems of West & East (1917) (also credited as Mrs. Harold Nicolson)
- The Land (1926)
- King's daughter (1929)
- Invitation to cast out care (1931)
- Sissinghurst (1931)
- Collected poems (1933)
- Solitude: a poem (1938)
- The Garden (1946)
- Lost poem (or A Madder Caress) (2013)

==== Novels ====
- Heritage (1919)
- The dragon in shallow waters (1920)
- Challenge (1920)
- Grey Wethers: a romantic novel (1923)
- Seducers in Ecuador (Hogarth Press, 1924)
- The Edwardians (1930)
- All Passion Spent (1931)
- Family History (1932)
- The Dark Island (1934)
- Grand Canyon: A Novel (1942)
- Devil at Westease: the story as related by Roger Liddiard (1947)
- The Easter party (1953)
- No Signposts in the Sea (1961)

==== Children's books ====
- A Note of Explanation (written for Queen Mary's Dolls' House in 1924, published posthumously in 2017)

==== Short stories and novellas ====
- Orchard and vineyard (1892)
- The heir: a love story (1922)
- To be let or sold (1930)
- Thirty Clocks Strike the Hour, and other stories (1932)
- The death of Noble Godavary and Gottfried Künstler (1932)
- Another world than this ..: an anthology (1945)
- Nursery rhymes (1947)

==== Plays ====
- Chatterton: a drama in three acts (1909)

=== Non-fiction ===
==== Letters ====
- Dearest Andrew: letters from V. Sackville-West to Andrew Reiber, 1951-1962 (1979)
- The Letters of Vita Sackville-West to Virginia Woolf (edited by Louise A. DeSalvo and Mitchell A. Leaska, Arrow, 1984)
- Vita and Harold: The Letters of Vita Sackville-West and Harold Nicolson (1992)
- Violet to Vita: The Letters of Violet Trefusis to Vita Sackville-West 1910–1921 (edited by Mitchell A. Leaska and John Phillips, 1991)
- Portrait of a Marriage: Vita Sackville-West and Harold Nicolson by Nigel Nicolson, Vita Sackville-West (compiled by her son Nigel Nicolson from her journals and letters, Weidenfeld & Nicolson, 1973)
- Love Letters: Vita and Virginia by Virginia Woolf and Vita Sackville-West (introduction by Alison Bechdel Vintage Classics, 2021)

==== Biographies ====
- Aphra Behn, the incomparable Astrea (Gerald Howe, 1927)
- Andrew Marvell (1929)
- Saint Joan of Arc (Doubleday 1936, reprinted M. Joseph 1969)
- Pepita (Doubleday, 1937, reprinted Hogarth Press 1970)
- The eagle and the dove, a Study in Contrasts: St. Teresa of Avila and St. Thérèse of Lisieux (M. Joseph, 1943)
- Daughter of France: the life of Anne Marie Louise d'Orléans, duchesse de Montpensier, 1627-1693, La Grande Mademoiselle (1959)

==== Guides ====
- Knole and the Sackvilles (1922) - a history of her ancestral home
- Passenger to Teheran (Hogarth Press 1926, reprinted Tauris Parke Paperbacks 2007, ISBN 978-1-84511-343-8)
- Twelve Days: an account of a journey across the Bakhtiari Mountains of South-western Persia (first published UK 1927; Doubleday Doran 1928; M. Haag 1987, reprinted Tauris Parke Paperbacks 2009 as Twelve Days in Persia)
- How does your garden grow? (1935) (Beverley Nichols, Compton Mackenzie, Marion Dudley Cran, Vita Sackville-West)
- Some flowers (1937)
- Country notes (1939)
- Country Notes in Wartime (Hogarth Press, 1940)
- English country houses (William Collins, 1941, illustrated)
- The Women's Land Army (M. Joseph / Ministry of Agriculture and Fisheries, 1944)
- Exhibition Catalogue: Elizabethan portraits (1947)
- Knole, Kent (1948)
- In Your Garden (1951)
- In your garden again (1953)
- Walter de la Mare and The traveller (1953)
- More for your garden (1955)
- Even more for your garden (1958)
- Joy of Gardening: a selection for Americans (1958)
- Berkeley Castle (1960)
- Faces: profiles of dogs (Harvill Press, 1961, photographs by Laelia Goehr)
- Garden Book (1975)
- Hidcote Manor Garden, Gloucestershire (1976)
- Une Anglaise en Orient (1993)

==== Translations ====
- Duineser Elegien: Elegies from the Castle of Duino, translated from the German of Rainer Maria Rilke by V. and Edward Sackville-West (1931)

In 1931, Virginia and Leonard Woolf's Hogarth Press published in London a small run of a beautiful edition of Rainer Maria Rilke's Duino Elegies. This marked the English debut of Rilke's masterpiece, which would eventually be rendered in English over 20 times, influencing countless poets, musicians and artists across the English-speaking world.

=== Influences ===
- Orlando: A Biography by Virginia Woolf (Hogarth Press, 1928)
- Behind the Mask: The Life of Vita Sackville-West by Matthew Dennison (2014)

== See also ==
- List of Bloomsbury Group people

== Sources ==
- Carney, Michael: Stoker: The Life of Hilda Matheson, privately published, Llangynog, 1999.
- Ghani, Sirus: Iran and the Rise of the Reza Shah: From Qajar Collapse to Pahlavi Power, I. B.Tauris, 2000.
- Glendinning, Victoria: Vita: The Life of Vita Sackville-West, Weidenfeld and Nicolson, 1983.
- Lord, Tony: Gardening at Sissinghurst, Frances Lincoln and National Trust, 2000.
- Massingham, Betty: A Century of Gardeners, Faber & Faber, 1982.
- Nicolson, Nigel: "Introduction", from A Passenger to Tehran, I.B Tauris, 2007.
- Sackville-West, Vita: Vita Sackville-West: Selected Writings, Preface by Nigel Nicolson, St. Martin's Press, 2015.
- Souhami, Diana: Mrs. Keppel and Her Daughter: A Biography, St. Martin's Press, 2014.
