= The Land (poem) =

1926 poem by Vita Sackville-West

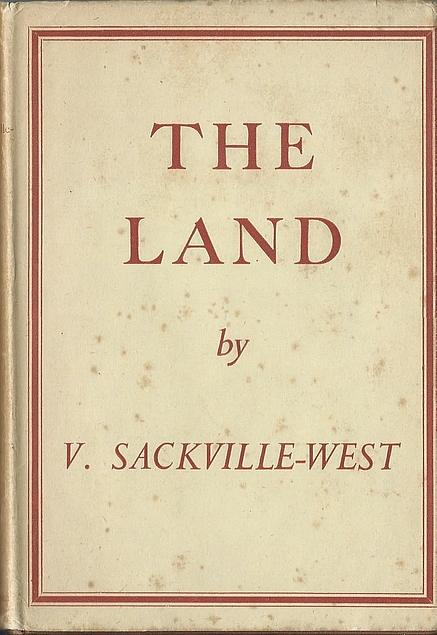
- The Land by Vita Sackville-West
- Author: Vita Sackville-West
- Language: English
- Genre: Georgic Poetry
- Published: 1926 (William Heinemann)
- Publication place: England
- Media type: Print (Hardcover)
- Pages: 96 (First Edition)

The Land is a book-length narrative poem by Vita Sackville-West. Published in 1926 by William Heinemann, it is a Georgic celebration of the rural landscape, traditions and history of the Kentish Weald where Sackville-West lived. The poem was popular enough for there to be six print runs in the first three years of its publication aided in part by its winning the Hawthornden Prize for Literature.

== Background ==
Sackville-West began working on the poem while accompanying her husband Harold Nicolson, who was an English diplomat, to the East. Nicolson records in his diary before leaving that Sackville-West had “an idea of writing a sort of English Georgics”. It has been speculated that the poem was a response to the homesickness that she felt for her home in Kent.

== Form and content ==
The poem adopts the traditional Georgic structure of the four seasons and is divided into four parts, running from Winter to Autumn, and documenting the agricultural traditions and changing landscape through the year. The poem’s intention to capture the natural processes that exist outside of history are made clear in the opening lines:

I sing the cycle of my country’s year,
I sing the tillage, and the reaping sing,
Classic monotony, that modes and wars
Leave undisturbed, unbettered, for their best
Was born immediate, of expediency.

In this respect, Sackville-West’s poem can be read within a transhistorical poetic tradition that includes Virgil’s Georgics (which provides the book’s epigraph), Hesiod’s Works and Days, and James Thomson’s The Seasons. Sackville-West, however, claimed not to have read the Georgics until more than half of the poem had been written.

Some critics have read Sackville-West’s poem as a response to the bleaker outlook and modernist style of T.S. Eliot’s The Waste Land, which was published four-years prior. Where Eliot’s work is famously difficult, pushing the boundaries of form, Sackville-West’s turn to tradition can be seen as an act of literary conservatism.

Yet, while The Land is often read as a work steeped in tradition, critics have pointed to the way in which the poem’s seeming conservatism allowed it to smuggle expressions of lesbian desire past the censor. For instance, Suzanne Raitt reads the poem as ‘typical of the homosexual subculture of the 1920s and 1930s’ in it suggestive use of natural metaphors and rural spaces.

The poem also arguably expresses Sackville-West’s frustration with being disinherited from Knole on account of her sex:

You took the waxen tablets in your hand,
And out of anger cut calm tales of home.

== Reception and awards ==
The poem was awarded the Hawthornden Prize in 1927.

The poem’s broader critical reception was more mixed. In her review of the poem for T.P.’s Weekly, the writer Rebecca West described the poem as having ‘the least chance of survival’ since, while ‘a very fine achievement’ it neither gives ‘intense pleasure’ nor ‘extend[s] our knowledge of reality by making explicit a certain phase of our experience’.

== The Land in Orlando ==
Virginia Woolf satirises The Land in her novel Orlando: A Biography, whose central protagonist is partially based on Sackville-West, who was her lover during the 1920s. Orlando is described as working on a poem entitled ‘The Oak Tree’, which the novel presents as having ‘nothing of the modern spirit’ but nonetheless winning a popular literary award. Later, when Orlando tries to bury the poem at the base of the oak tree which inspired it, Woolf writes that it was “a return to the land of what the land has given me”.

Many critics have picked up on this intertextual dimension and seen it as reflecting Woolf’s ambivalence towards Sackville-West’s literary output.

== Sources ==
Bazargan, Susan. 'The Uses of the Land: Vita Sackville-West's Pastoral Writings and Virginia Woolf's "Orlando".' Woolf Studies Annual 5 (1999).
Blyth, Ian. 'A Sort of English Georgics: Vita Sackville-West’s The Land'. Forum for Modern Language Studies 45.1 (2008).
Glendinning, Victorian. Vita: The Life of Sackville West. 1983. London: Penguin Books
Raitt, Suzanne. Vita and Virginia: The Work and Friendship of V. Sackville‑West and Virginia Woolf. 1993. Cambridge: Cambridge U.P.
West, Rebecca. 'The Poetry of 1927'. T.P.'s Weekly (7 Jan 1928).
