= Saint Joan of Arc (book) =

1936 biography by Vita Sackville-West

- Author: Vita Sackville-West
- Language: English
- Publication date: 1936
- Publication place: United Kingdom

Saint Joan of Arc is a biography of Joan of Arc by Vita Sackville-West first published in New York and London in 1936. The Grove Press (New York City) re-issue of 2001 runs to 395 pages including appendices which collate the events of Joan's life, present a chronological table and give a bibliography of related pre-1936 works.
