= Pepita de Oliva =

Spanish dancer (1830–1871)

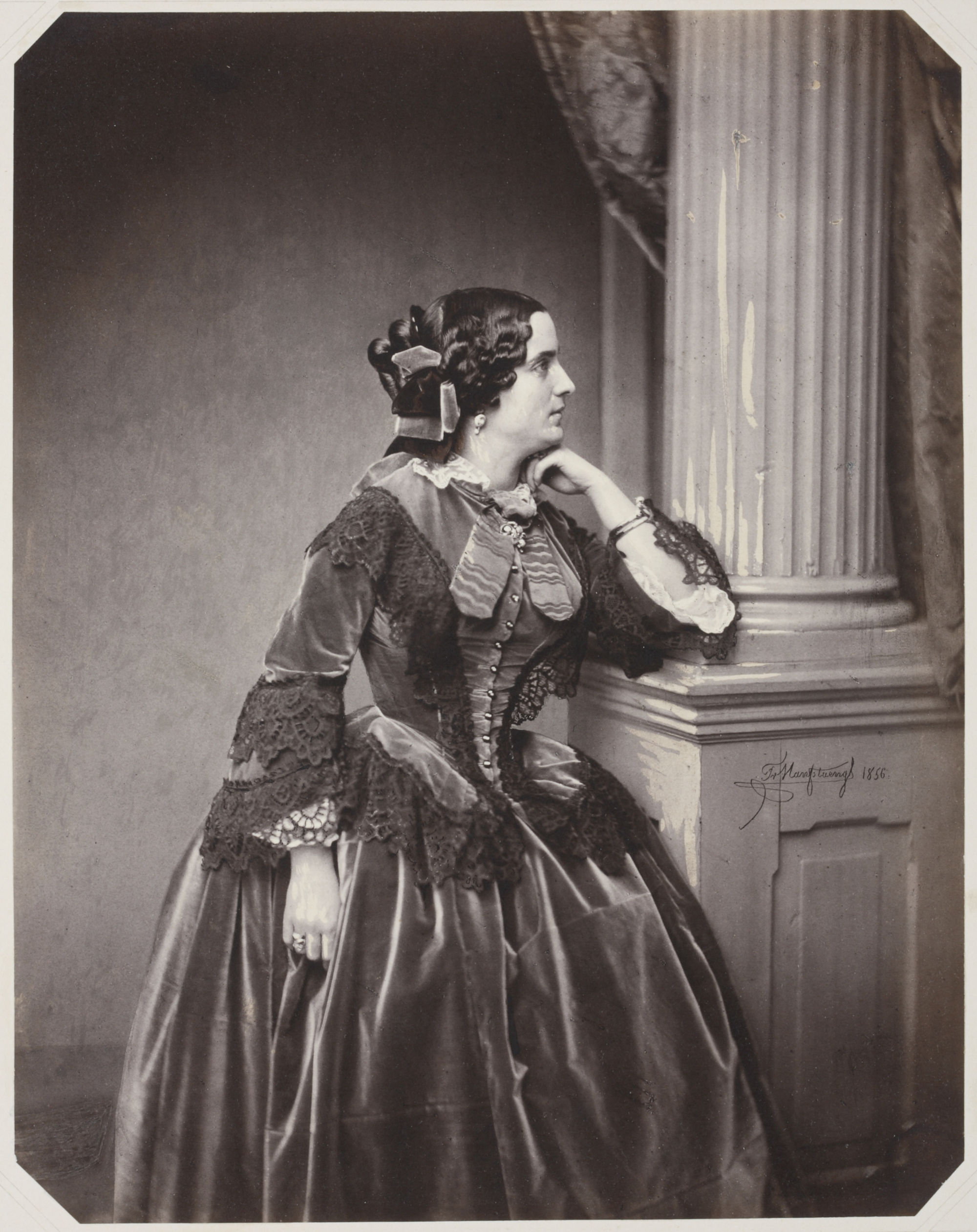
- Portrait photograph by Franz Hanfstaengl, 1856
- Born: Josefa Durán y Ortega c. 1830; Málaga, Spain
- Died: 10 March 1871; Arcachon, France
- Occupation: Flamenco dancer
- Years active: 1852–1858

Josefa Durán y Ortega (c. 1830–10 March 1871), known by the stage name Pepita de Oliva, was a Romani Spanish dancer who performed across Europe, popularizing Spanish flamenco dancing and costumes. Despite her official marriage with her dance teacher Juan Antonio Gabriel de la Oliva in 1851, the following year she established a partnership with the British diplomat Lionel Sackville-West with whom she had five children. Her daughter Victoria gave birth to the English writer Vita Sackville-West, who in 1937 published a biography of her grandmother titled Pepita.

== Biography ==
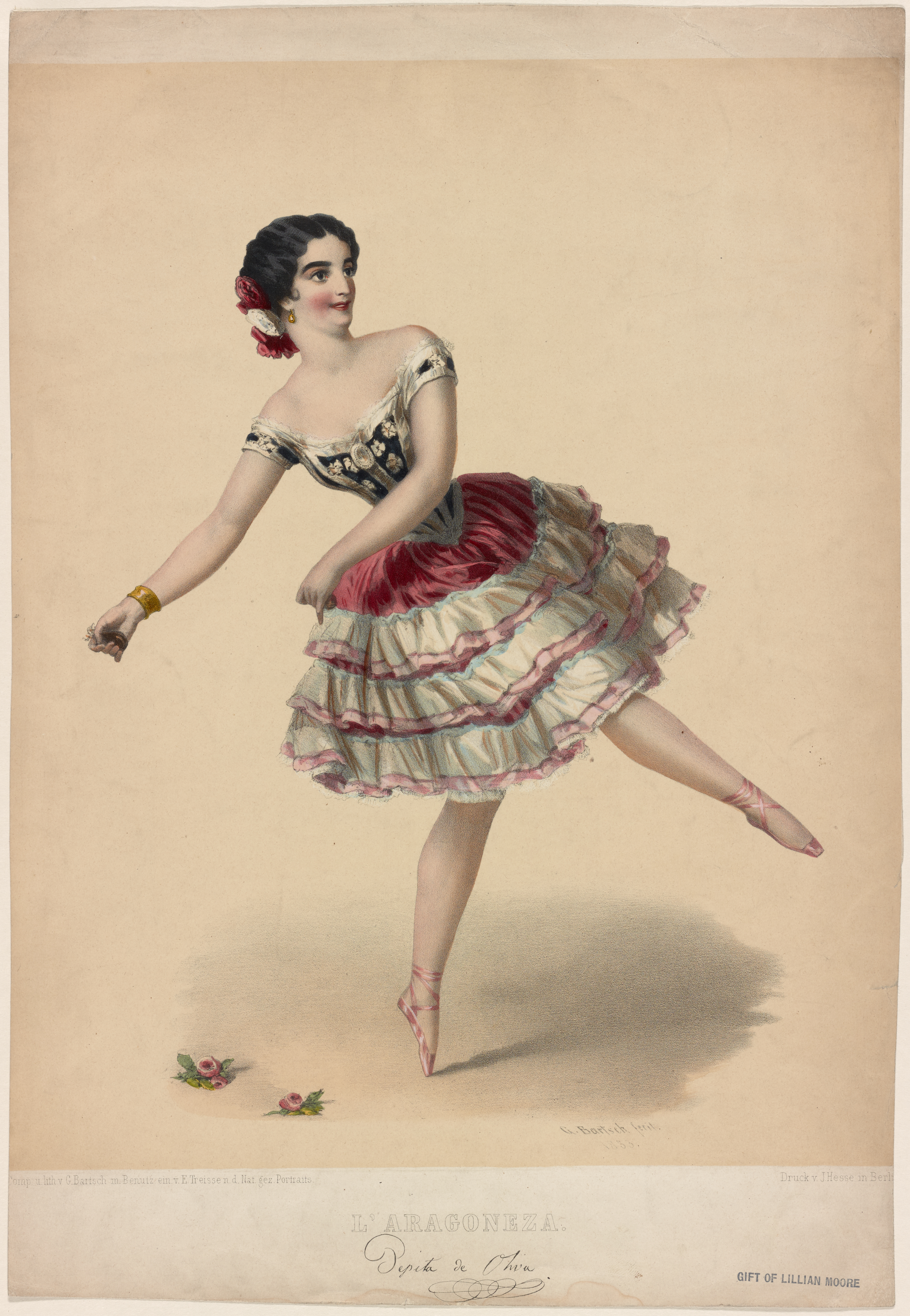
Pepita de Oliva dancing the "Aragoneza" (1853)

Born in Málaga in about 1830, Josefa Durán y Ortega was officially the daughter of Pedro Durán and Catalina Ortega although it was rumoured her father was the celebrated nobleman Francisco de Borja Téllez-Girón y Pimentel, the 10th Duke of Osuna. Her mother was a Romani washerwoman and dealer in old clothes who had earlier performed in a circus, while Pedro Durán, a barber, died in a street brawl when she was six.

Thanks to her mother who had a close, supportive relationship with her daughter, Pepita was given dancing lessons in Málaga, soon becoming a promising performer. Her mother took her to Madrid and convinced the director of the Teatro del Principe to send her to dance lessons as a means of joining the theatre's corps de ballet. Unfortunately Pepita did not make the grade, no doubt because her style did not coincide with the theatre's requirements. The ballet director of Madrid's Teatro Real, Manuel Guerrero y Casares, thought she would become popular outside Spain. He arranged dancing lessons for her under Juan Antonio Gabriel de la Oliva, who had gained a reputation in A Coruña and was performing at the Teatro Real. He fell in love with Pepita and the two married in January 1851 in the Iglesia de San Millán but separated a few months later.

Her first appearance was in May 1852 at the Grand Théâtre in Bordeaux, France, where she was highly acclaimed. She then performed in Copenhagen, dancing "La Farsa Pepita" which had been specially composed for her, receiving even more enthusiastic admiration. After equal acclaim in German cities, including Frankfurt, Stuttgart and Berlin. In May 1852 she appeared at Her Majesty's Theatre in London, dancing the "Madrileña", the "Aragoneza", and the "Jaleo de Jerez".

In July 1852, she made her début at the Théâtre du Vaudeville in Paris where she received a tremendous ovation and was showered with flowers. The following month she added the "Olé" to her repertoire, receiving even more attention than the star ballerina of the Paris Opera. In the autumn of 1852 in Paris, the British diplomat Lionel Sackville-West set his eyes on Pepita. Introduced to her by a friend, the two immediately became lovers. After spending a week with her in her Paris hotel, he had to return to Stuttgart where he worked. He arranged an engagement for her at the Stuttgart theatre, the start of various appearances in German cities. The two spent as much time together as possible, embarking on a lifelong relationship.

Pepita also appeared in Vienna where Johann Strauss II composed the Pepita-Polka for her. Her influence there was so great that the Viennese actress Marie Geistinger copied her style, appearing in Die falsche Pepita at the Theater in der Josefstadt in 1852.

In May 1858, her first child with Sackville-West was born in Granada. She then joined him in Germany where they lived in Heidelberg and Hackenfeldt before settling in Turin where Sackville-West had been posted. Her second child, Victoria, was born in September 1862.

After Turin, Sackville-West was sent to Madrid while Pepita settled in Bordeaux where her third child, Elisa Catalina, was born in 1865. She retired from dancing and spent the rest of her life in their houses in Arcachon and Paris. She died in Arcachon on 10 March 1871 at 8pm, few dais after giving birth to her son Frederic, who also did not survive.

Sackville-West, who treated her as his wife, published the following announcement in the French press following her death: "Lionel Sackville-West, first secretary to the English embassy in Paris and interim Minister Extraordinary and Plenipotentiary, requests the assistance of his friends and colleagues at one of the masses which will be held in the Church of Our Lady, on the 21st March, for the resting of the soul of his wife, Josefina, Baroness Sackville-West." Nevertheless it was never proved that her marriage was legal as apparently she had never obtained a divorce from Juan de la Oliva (who died in 1888).

== See also ==
- List of dancers
