= Lionel Sackville-West, 3rd Baron Sackville =

British peer (1867–1928)

The Lord Sackville
- Baron Sackville
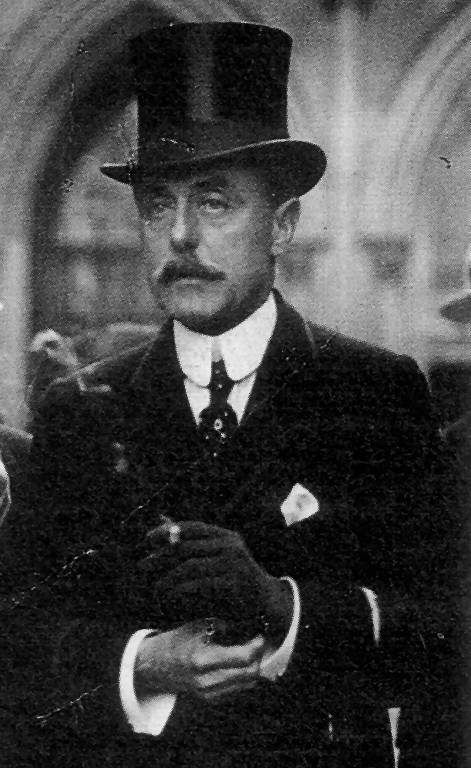
- Tenure: 3 September 1908 – 28 January 1928
- Successor: Charles Sackville-West, 4th Baron
- Born: Lionel Edward Sackville-West; 15 May 1867
- Died: 28 January 1928 (aged 60)
- Spouse: Victoria Sackville-West (m. 1890)
- Issue: Victoria Mary (Vita) Sackville-West
- Parents: William Edward Sackville-West; Georgina Dodwell

Lionel Edward Sackville-West, 3rd Baron Sackville (15 May 1867 – 28 January 1928), was a British peer.

Sackville-West was the son of the Honourable William Edward Sackville-West, sixth son of George Sackville-West, 5th Earl De La Warr and Lady Elizabeth Sackville. His mother was Georgina, daughter of Capt. George Dodwell, of Kevinsfort House, of Sligo. He inherited the barony in 1908 on the death of his uncle, the diplomat Lionel Sackville-West, 2nd Baron Sackville. In April 1912, Lord Sackville was appointed a deputy lieutenant of Kent. He was a member of Kent County Council and served as Vice-Chairman from 1923 until his death. He married his first cousin Victoria Sackville-West (1862–1936), illegitimate daughter of the second Baron, in 1890. Their daughter was the novelist and poet Vita Sackville-West.

Peerage of the United Kingdom
Preceded by Lionel Sackville-West	Baron Sackville; 1908–1928	Succeeded by Charles Sackville-West
