= Victoria Sackville-West, Baroness Sackville =

British noblewoman

The Right Honourable The Lady Sackville
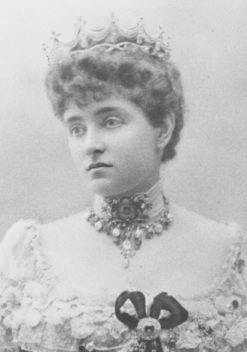
- Circa 1885
- Born: Victoria Josefa Dolores Catalina Sackville-West; 23 September 1862; Paris, France
- Died: 30 January 1936 (aged 73); Roedean, Sussex, England
- Spouse: Lionel Edward Sackville-West, 3rd Baron Sackville (m. 1890; died 1928)
- Children: Vita Sackville-West
- Parent(s): Lionel Sackville-West, 2nd Baron Sackville; Josefa de la Oliva (née Durán y Ortega)

Victoria Josefa Dolores Catalina Sackville-West, Baroness Sackville (23 September 1862 – 30 January 1936) was a British noblewoman and mother of the writer, poet, and gardener Vita Sackville-West.

== Early life ==
Victoria was one of seven illegitimate children of the English diplomat Lionel Sackville-West, 2nd Baron Sackville, and a Spanish dancer known by the stage name of "Pepita de Oliva", (Josefa née Durán y Ortega; she was married to Juan Antonio de Oliva). Pepita was referred to as Countess West, though she never divorced her legal husband or married the father of her children. Victoria was, in youth, referred to as Pepita Sackville West, or "Lolo", a diminutive of her name Dolores. While at convent school in 1881, however, the truth of her origins was revealed, and she was advised to be known as Victoria West. Victoria's siblings included sisters Flora (born 1866), Amalia Marguerite Albertine (born 1868), and Eliza (who died in 1866, the year after her birth ); and brothers Ernest Henry Jean Baptiste (born 1869), Maximiliano (born 1858), and a short-lived brother named Frederic who died, along with their mother, soon after his birth in March 1871.

== Adult life ==
In 1890 Victoria married her first cousin Lionel Edward Sackville-West, 3rd Baron Sackville. Their daughter, born in 1892, was the writer, poet, and gardener Vita Sackville-West. The family lived mainly at Knole House, an estate that had been in the Sackville family for centuries.

Victoria was notorious for beginning and dropping various money-making schemes, some intended for supposedly charitable aims, but most for her personal use. Among the schemes was one involving the opening of a shop in South Audley Street, London which Victoria wanted to name Knole Guild following a charitable scheme she had started in Kent of that name. Her husband Lord Sackville objected, and it was doubtless pointed out that the shop was for her own pecuniary benefit and not that of a charity. It was, in the end, named Spealls. Victoria was not good at retailing, and enlisted the services of her even less suitable daughter Vita, to contribute to the store's stocks. The shop ended in failure, as did many of Victoria's enterprises.

Lady Sackville was a close friend of the sculptor Auguste Rodin; his marble bust of her, dated 1913, is on display at the Rodin Museum

Victoria's life has been largely overshadowed by the controversial life of her bisexual daughter, Vita.

In 1912 she inherited a large fortune from her lover Sir John Scott, 1st Baronet of Connaught Place (1847–1912), who was involved in establishing the Wallace Collection as a national art museum.

=== Houses ===
A long time friend, companion, patroness and mistress (1916–1926) of the architect Edwin Lutyens, she engaged Lutyens to remodel a house for her at Sussex Square, Brighton, She is also attributed with commissioning Lutyens to build other houses, for example White Lodge at Roedean, Brighton and another for her guests at Worthing. She also commissioned Lutyens to remodel two houses in London, at Ebury Square, Belgravia and at Hill Street, Mayfair.

== Later life ==
Increasingly intolerant of her husband's infidelities, which were carried out in plain sight at their home at Knole, Lady Sackville removed herself to a house on the clifftop overlooking Brighton, Sussex called White Lodge. Her daughter claimed in her book Pepita that Victoria's departure followed what to her appeared to be a subtle argument. Lord Sackville, having experienced war service, was, on his return, more active in the management of Knole. He merely told Lady Sackville that she should inform their bailiff if she wished to take any of their workmen away from the duties to which they had been allotted by the bailiff. She was not to interfere in matters otherwise, whereas she clearly felt she was the rightful chatelaine of the ancient property.

While at White Lodge, she indulged in increasingly eccentric schemes, mostly designed to raise funds for her own benefit given her straitened circumstances. She had experienced at least a couple of nervous breakdowns earlier in her life and seems to have declined into a state of litigiousness, perhaps from an increasingly pressing sense of persecution owing to her illegitimacy and lack of belonging. She became notorious for the number of writs she issued, and was even credited with referring to her home as the "Writs Hotel".
