= Sissinghurst Castle Garden =

Garden in Kent, England

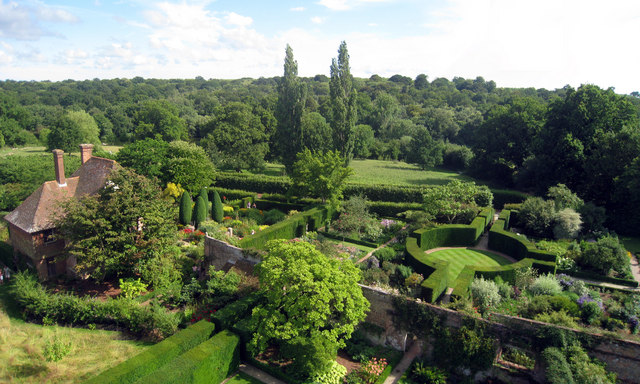
- Aerial view in 2009: "The most famous twentieth century garden in England"

- Location within Kent
- 51.1157°N 0.5815°E
- Type: Garden
- Location: Sissinghurst

Site notes
- Restored by: Vita Sackville-West and Harold Nicolson
- Governing body: National Trust

National Register of Historic Parks and Gardens
- Official name: Sissinghurst Castle
- Designated: 1 May 1986
- Reference no.: 1000181

Listed Building – Grade I
- Official name: West Range at Sissinghurst Castle
- Designated: 9 June 1952
- Reference no.: 1346285

Listed Building – Grade I
- Official name: Tower and Walls 30 yards East of the West Range at Sissinghurst Castle
- Designated: 9 June 1952
- Reference no.: 1084163

Listed Building – Grade II*
- Official name: The Priest's House at Sissinghurst Castle
- Designated: 20 June 1967
- Reference no.: 1346286

Listed Building – Grade II*
- Official name: The South Cottage
- Designated: 20 June 1967
- Reference no.: 1084164

Sissinghurst Castle Garden, at Sissinghurst in the Weald of Kent in England, was created by Vita Sackville-West, a poet and writer, and her husband Harold Nicolson, an author and diplomat. It is among the most famous gardens in England and is designated Grade I on Historic England's register of historic parks and gardens. It was bought by Sackville-West in 1930, and over the next thirty years, working with, and later succeeded by, a series of notable head gardeners, she and Nicolson transformed a farmstead of "squalor and slovenly disorder" into one of the world's most influential gardens. Following Sackville-West's death in 1962, the estate was donated to the National Trust. It was ranked 42nd on the list of the Trust's most-visited sites in the 2021–2022 season, with over 150,000 visitors.

The gardens contain an internationally respected plant collection, particularly the assemblage of old garden roses. The writer Anne Scott-James considered the roses at Sissinghurst to be "one of the finest collections in the world". A number of plants propagated in the gardens bear names related to people connected with Sissinghurst or the name of the garden itself. The garden design is based on axial walks that open onto enclosed gardens, termed "garden rooms", one of the earliest examples of this gardening style. Among the individual "garden rooms", the White Garden has been particularly influential, with the horticulturalist Tony Lord describing it as "the most ambitious ... of its time, the most entrancing of its type."

The site of Sissinghurst is ancient and has been occupied since at least the Middle Ages. The present-day buildings began as a house built in the 1530s by Sir John Baker. In 1554 Sir John's daughter Cecily married Thomas Sackville, 1st Earl of Dorset, an ancestor of Vita Sackville-West. By the 18th century the Bakers' fortunes had waned, and the house, renamed Sissinghurst Castle, was leased to the government to act as a prisoner-of-war camp during the Seven Years' War. The prisoners caused great damage and by the 19th century much of Sir Richard's house had been demolished. In the mid-19th century, the remaining buildings were in use as a workhouse, and by the 20th century Sissinghurst had declined to the status of a farmstead. In 1928 the castle was advertised for sale but remained unsold for two years.

Sackville-West was born in 1892 at Knole, the ancestral home of the Sackvilles. But for her sex, Sackville-West would have inherited Knole on the death of her father in 1928. Instead, following primogeniture, the house and the title passed to her uncle, a loss she felt deeply. In 1930, after she and Nicolson became concerned that their home Long Barn was threatened by development, Sackville-West bought Sissinghurst Castle. On purchasing Sissinghurst, Sackville-West and Nicolson inherited little more than some oak and nut trees, a quince, and a single old rose. Sackville-West planted the noisette rose 'Madame Alfred Carrière' on the south face of the South Cottage even before the deeds to the property had been signed. Nicolson was largely responsible for planning the garden design, while Sackville-West undertook the planting. Over the next thirty years, working with her head gardeners, she cultivated some two hundred varieties of roses and large numbers of other flowers and shrubs. Decades after Sackville-West and Nicolson created "a garden where none was", Sissinghurst remains a major influence on horticultural thought and practice.

== History ==
=== Early history ===
The site is ancient; "hurst" is the Saxon term for an enclosed wood. Nigel Nicolson, in his 1964 guide, Sissinghurst Castle: An Illustrated History, records the earliest owners as the de Saxinhersts. (Note: Nicolson notes that "the spelling of the name fluctuat(es) at the will of the scribe". The brief early records of the site use Saxinherst, Saxingherste and Saxenhurst. Adam Nicolson suggests that the name derives from, or is the origin of, Sissinghurst, perhaps meaning "the wood of the Saxons".) Stephen de Saxinherst is named in an 1180 charter about the nearby Combwell Priory. At the end of the 13th century the estate had passed, through marriage, to the de Berhams. Nicolson suggested that the de Berhams constructed a moated house in stone, of an appearance similar to that of Ightham Mote, which was later replaced by a brick manor. More recent studies, including those of Nicolson's son, Adam, cast doubt on the existence of an earlier stone manor, suggesting instead that the brick house, or perhaps a timber construction of a slightly earlier date, occupying the corner of the orchard nearest the moat, was the earliest house on the site. Edward I is reputed to have stayed at this house in 1305.

=== Rise, decline, collapse: c. 1490–1930 ===
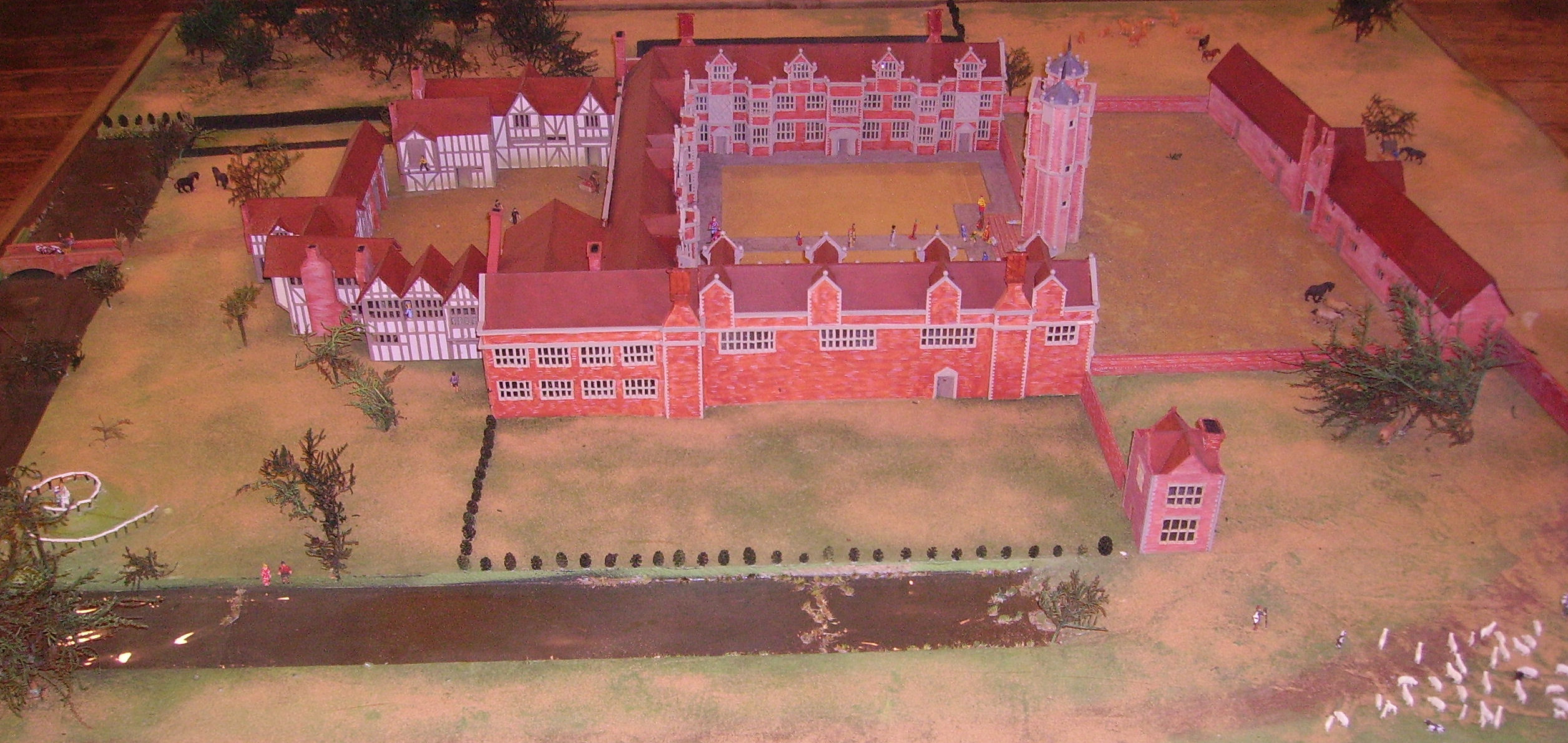
Model displayed at Sissinghurst depicting Sir Richard Baker's house circa 1560

In 1490 the de Berhams sold the manor of Sissinghurst to Thomas Baker of Cranbrook. The Bakers were cloth producers and in the following century, through marriage and careers at court and in the law, Thomas's successors greatly expanded their wealth and their estates in Kent and Sussex. In the 1530s Sir John Baker, one of Henry VIII's Privy Councillors, built a new brick gatehouse, the current West Range. (Note: The construction of new homes on sites adjacent to older houses was a fairly common practice in Tudor England. Sir John's approach was followed, for example, by the Duke of Norfolk at Kenninghall.) In 1554 Sir John's daughter Cecily married Thomas Sackville, 1st Earl of Dorset, creating the earliest connection between the Sackville family and the house. Sir John's son Richard undertook a massive prodigy expansion in the 1560s. The Tower is part of that expansion, and formed the entrance to a very large courtyard house, of which the South Cottage and some walls are the only other remaining fragments. Sir Richard surrounded the mansion with an enclosed 700-acre (2.8 km^{2}) deer park and in August 1573 entertained Queen Elizabeth I at Sissinghurst.

After the collapse of the Baker family fortunes following the civil war (1642–1651), the building declined in importance. Horace Walpole visited in 1752: "yesterday, after twenty mishaps, we got to Sissinghurst for dinner. There is a park in ruins and a house in ten times greater ruins." During the Seven Years' War, it became a prisoner-of-war camp. (Note: An 18th century painting of the castle at this time was identified as being of Sissinghurst only in 2008. Showing the house before its destruction, it is the most complete record of the house as built by Sir Richard Baker. The painting is reproduced on the inside front cover of Adam Nicolson's book, Sissinghurst: an unfinished History.) The historian Edward Gibbon, then serving in the Hampshire militia, was stationed there and recorded "the inconceivable dirtiness of the season, the country and the spot". It was during its use as a camp for French prisoners that the name Sissinghurst Castle was adopted; although it was never a castle, there is debate as to the extent to which the house was a fortified manor. In 2018 an important collection of historical graffiti drawn by some of the 3,000 prisoners was uncovered beneath 20th-century plaster. Around 1800, the estate was purchased by the Mann family and the majority of Sir Richard's Elizabethan house was demolished; the stone and brick were reused in buildings throughout the locality. The castle later became a workhouse for the Cranbrook Union, after which it housed farm labourers. In 1928, the castle was put up for sale for a price of £12,000, but attracted no bids for two years.

=== Vita Sackville-West and Harold Nicolson: 1930–1968 ===
==== Vita Sackville-West ====
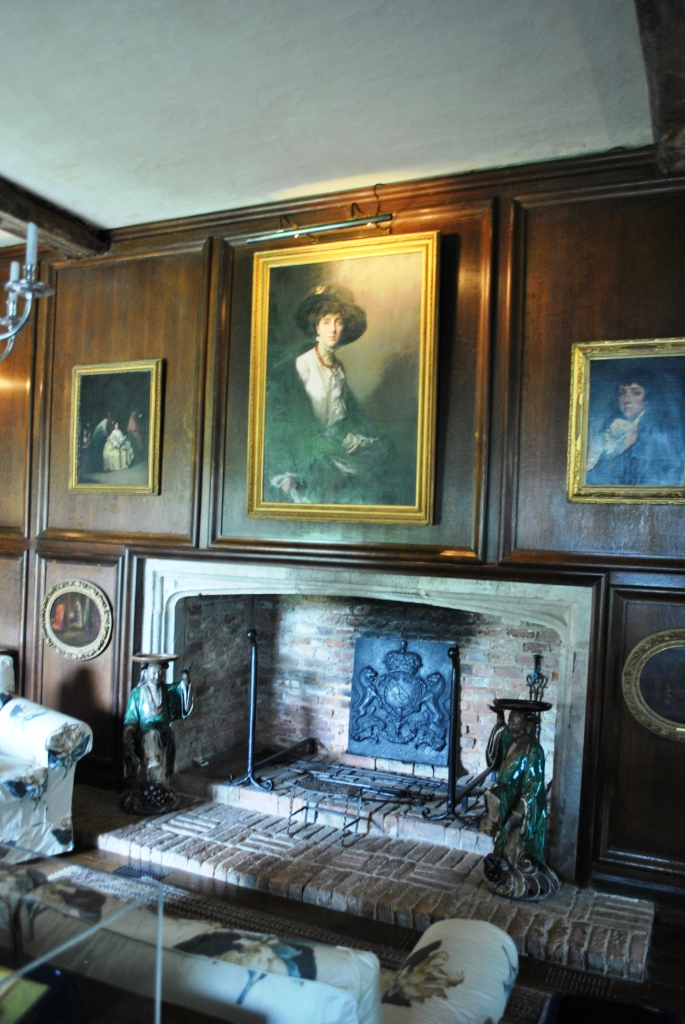
Sackville-West's portrait by Philip de László hanging in the Big Room of the West Range

Vita Sackville-West, poet, author, and gardener, was born at Knole, about 25 miles from Sissinghurst, on 9 March 1892. The great Elizabethan mansion, home of her ancestors but denied to her through agnatic primogeniture, (Note: Although her father Lionel's only child, and a Sackville twice over, through her parents being cousins and her grandfathers being brothers, the practice of inheritance solely through the male line saw Knole pass to her father's brother Charles.) held enormous importance for her throughout her life. (Note: The county of Kent, as well as Knole, had significance for Sackville-West. Her epic poem, The Land, includes the lines; "Hear first of the country that shall claim my theme, the Weald of Kent, once forest, and to-day meadow and orchard, garden of fruit and hops, a green, wet country on a bed of clay ...") Sissinghurst was a substitute for Knole, and she greatly valued its familial connections. (Note: The Table of Descent set out in her book, Knole And The Sackvilles, records the marriage of Thomas Sackville to Cecily, daughter of Sir John Baker of Sissinghurst Castle, Cranford, Kent in 1554.) In 1913 Sackville-West married Harold Nicolson, a diplomat at the start of his career. Their relationship was unconventional, with both pursuing multiple, mainly same-sex, affairs. After breaking with her lover Violet Trefusis in 1921, Sackville-West became increasingly withdrawn. She wrote to her mother that she would like "to live alone in a tower with her books", an ambition she achieved in the tower at Sissinghurst where only her dogs were regularly admitted. (Note: Sackville-West consciously designed Sissinghurst without any guest accommodation, as her dislike of visitors and love of solitude came to be dominant features in her character. Nigel Nicolson recorded his mother's explanation for requiring that he and his brother share a bedroom until they went to university. "If we had a bedroom each and one of us was away Lady Colefax might find out and invite herself for the weekend.")

From 1946 until a few years before her death, Sackville-West wrote a gardening column for The Observer, in which, although she never referred directly to Sissinghurst, she discussed a wide array of horticultural issues. (Note: These were subsequently published in four volumes by Michael Joseph; In your Garden (1951), In Your Garden Again (1953), More For Your Garden (1955) and Even More for Your Garden (1958).) In an article, "Some Flowers", she discussed the challenge of writing effectively about flowers: "I discovered this only when I started to do so. Before ... I found myself losing my temper with the nauseating phraseology ... and sickly vocabulary employed." In 1955, in recognition of her achievement at Sissinghurst, "bending some stubborn acres to my will", she was awarded the Royal Horticultural Society's Veitch Medal. Her biographer Victoria Glendinning considers Sissinghurst to be Sackville-West's "one magnificent act of creation".

==== Harold Nicolson ====
Harold Nicolson, diplomat, author, diarist, and politician, was born in Tehran on 21 September 1886. Following his father into the diplomatic corps, he served as a junior member of the British delegation at the Paris Peace Conference at the end of the First World War, and returned to Iran as Counsellor in 1925. In 1929 he resigned from the Foreign Office to pursue a career in journalism, editing the Londoner's Diary for Lord Beaverbrook's Evening Standard. This proved unsuccessful, as did his subsequent political career, which saw him move from Oswald Mosley's New Party to Clement Attlee's Labour Party. Throughout, he maintained a detailed private diary. His entry for 4 April 1930, records, "Vita telephones to say she has seen the ideal house – a place in Kent, near Cranbrook, a sixteenth-century castle".

==== Building a garden ====
One might reasonably have hoped to inherit century-old hedges of yew, some gnarled mulberries, a cedar or two, a pleached alley, flagged walls, a mound. Instead there was nothing but weed, rough grass, a shabby eyesore of a greenhouse in the wrong place, broken fencing, wired chicken runs, squalor and slovenly disorder everywhere.

— Sackville-West's first impressions of Sissinghurst

Sackville-West and Nicolson found Sissinghurst in April 1930, after Dorothy Wellesley, their near neighbour and a former lover of Sackville-West's, saw the estate for sale. They had become increasingly concerned about encroaching development near their property Long Barn, near Sevenoaks, Kent. (Note: In 1925, they had considered Bodiam Castle as an alternative to Long Barn. Their plan was for they and the children each to inhabit one of the four concentric towers. However the price, £30,000, was well beyond their means.) Their offer on Sissinghurst was accepted on 6 May and the castle and the farm around it were bought for £12,375, using only Sackville-West's money rather than Nicolson's.

The property was 450 acres (1.8 km^{2}) in total. The house had no electricity, running water, or drains, and the garden was in disarray. Anne Scott-James notes their "planting inheritance" as "a grove of nut-trees, some apple trees, a quince [and] a tangle of old roses". The physical assets on the site were "four buildings of beautiful mellow brick, part of a moat [and] various fine walls". Clearing the ground took almost three years, but by 1939 the garden was largely complete, with the exception of the White Garden. Nicolson was responsible for the design and layout, while Sackville-West, at the head of her team of gardeners, undertook the planting. Simon Jenkins, the architectural writer, describes Nicolson's design as "post-Picturesque, a garden not as an imitation of nature but as imitation of a house", and suggests his thinking was much influenced by Lawrence Johnston's garden at Hidcote. Sackville-West's approach was plant-centred, within the constraints of her husband's plan, "profusion, even extravagance and exuberance, within confines of the utmost linear severity".

The buildings scattered around the site were converted to become an unconventional home. Part of the long brick gatehouse range from Sir John Baker's construction of c.1533 became the library, or Big Room; the tower gatehouse dating from Richard Baker's rebuilding in 1560–1570 became Sackville-West's sitting room, study, and sanctuary. The Priest's House was home to their sons Ben and Nigel, and held the family dining room, while the South Cottage housed their bedrooms and Nicolson's writing room.

The garden was first opened to the paying public for two days in mid-1938. (Note: A young visitor on that first opening recalled being terrified by "the looming giantess in top boots" and annoyed by the "snooty" boys who surveyed the visitors from the tower.) Thereafter, the opening hours were gradually increased. Despite her love of privacy, Sackville-West came to enjoy greatly her encounters with the visitors, known as "shillingses" on account of the entrance fees they deposited in a bowl at the gate. She described her relationship with them in a 1939 article in the New Statesman: "between them and myself a particular form of courtesy survives, a gardener's courtesy". Nicolson was less welcoming. Sackville-West's Observer articles raised awareness of the garden; Scott-James records photographic articles in Gardening Illustrated, Vogue, and Picture Post, and notes consequently that "increasingly paying visitors poured into Sissinghurst, coming in thousands in the course of a summer".

==== War and after ====
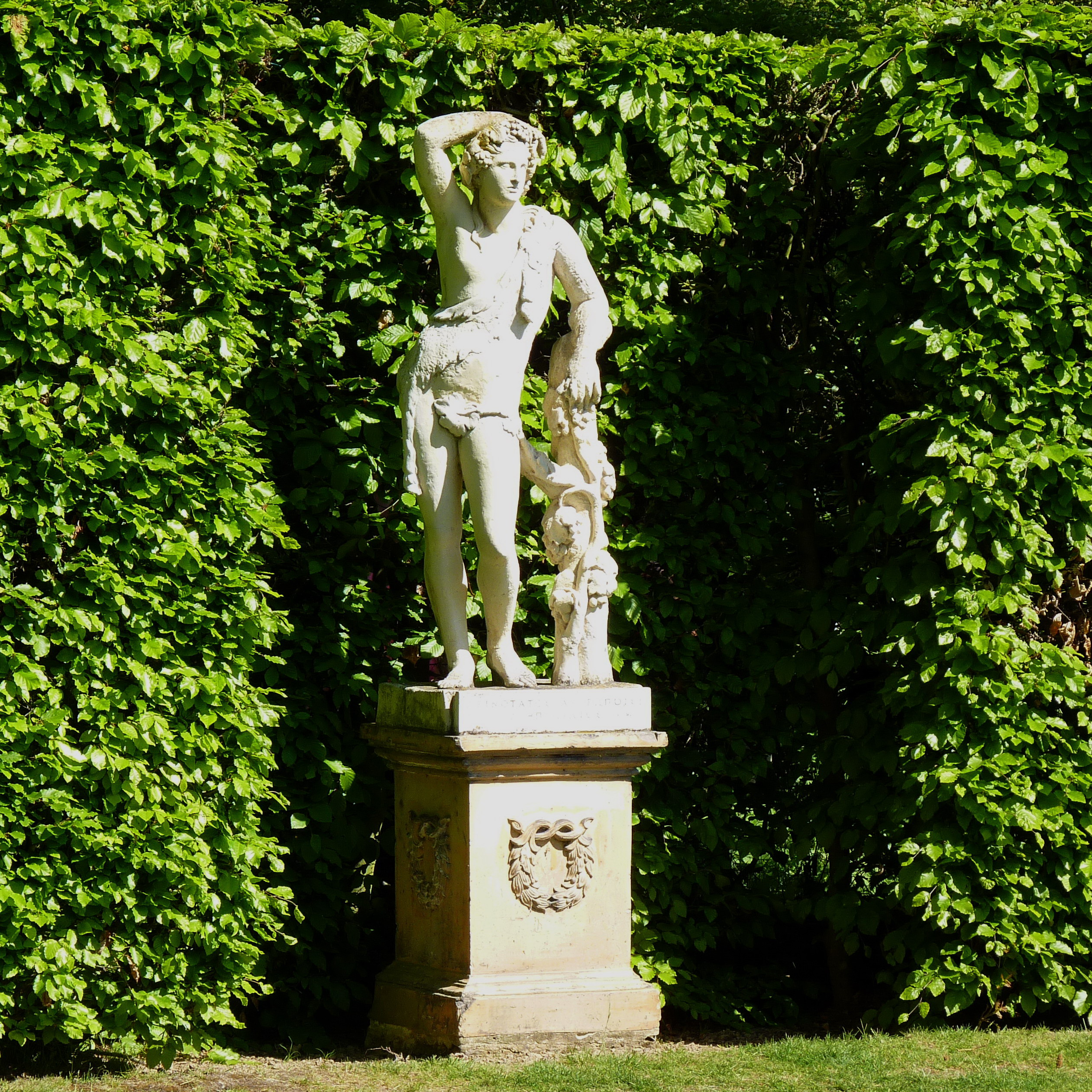
The statuary at Sissinghurst was not always of the highest quality. Anne Scott-James describes this one of Dionysus as looking "particularly depressed". (Note: Anne Scott-James remarks that the Nicolsons' relatively limited means sometimes impacted on their plans. Paths were laid from concrete cast on-site, rather than by using the York stone slabs both of them would have preferred, and "most of the statues were picked up in junk shops and are without distinction". Adam Nicolson describes the statues, with the exceptions of the pieces inherited from or given by Lady Sackville, as "cheap".)

Nicolson's diary entry for 26 September 1938 records the tense European atmosphere at the time of the Munich Crisis. "They are making the big room at Sissinghurst gas-proof. I know one who will not be there. He will be in his bed minus gas-mask and with all the windows open." He drove down to Sissinghurst on the day war was declared, encountering an angry woman who shook her fist at him while declaring that the war was the fault of the rich. He found on his arrival at the castle that the Sackville flag had been lowered from the tower. During the Second World War, Sissinghurst saw much of the Battle of Britain, which was mainly fought over the Weald and the English Channel. Nicolson's diary entry for 2 September 1940 reads: "a tremendous raid in the morning and the whole upper air buzzes and zooms with the noise of aeroplanes. There are many fights over our sunlight fields". (Note: Although Sissinghurst was undamaged, Knole was bombed in 1944. This prompted Sackville-West into violent reaction. "I mind frightfully, frightfully, frightfully. I always persuade myself that I have finally torn Knole out of my heart, and then the moment anything touches it, every nerve is alive again. I cannot bear to think of Knole wounded. Those filthy Germans! Let us level every town in Germany to the ground! I shan't care.")

In 1956, the BBC proposed making a television programme at Sissinghurst. Although Sackville-West was in favour, Nicolson was opposed. "I have a vague prejudice against (a) exposing my intimate affections to the public gaze; (b) indulging in private theatricals." He later withdrew his objections, but Sackville-West declined the BBC's offer in order to please him. In 1959 the American CBS network broadcast a four-way discussion from the dining room at the Priest's House, between Nicolson, the journalist Edward R. Murrow, and the diplomats Chip Bohlen and Clare Boothe Luce. Sackville-West intensely disliked the result.

Sackville-West died in the first-floor bedroom of the Priest's House on 2 June 1962. Nicolson recorded her death in his diary: "Ursula (Note: Ursula Codrington was Sackville-West's secretary from 1959.) is with Vita. At about 1.5 she observes that Vita is breathing heavily, and then suddenly is silent. She dies without fear or self-reproach. I pick some of her favourite flowers and lay them on her bed". (Note: This entry ends the published collection of Nicolson's diaries, an endeavour begun on 1 January 1930. Although he continued the diary until October 1964, Nigel Nicolson considered the material written after his mother's death to be too personal: "His grief can be imagined but should not be laid bare.") Her death devastated Nicolson and his last years were not happy. Giving up his Albany apartment in May 1965, he retired to Sissinghurst and thereafter he never stayed anywhere else. He died of a heart attack in his bedroom at the South Cottage on 1 May 1968.

==== Nigel Nicolson ====
Never, never, never! Au grand jamais, jamais. Never, never, never! ... so long as I live no National Trust ... shall have my darling. No, no. Over my corpse or my ashes, not otherwise. It is bad enough to have lost my Knole but they shan't take Sissinghurst from me. That at least is my own. They shan't, they shan't, I won't. They can't make me, I won't. They can't make me. I never would.

— Sackville-West's reaction to the suggestion that Sissinghurst might be gifted to the National Trust

Nigel Nicolson had always been devoted to his father, and admiring of his more distant mother. Preserving Sissinghurst was "an act of intense filial duty". He had first raised the possibility of giving the house and garden to the National Trust in 1954, but Sackville-West was adamantly opposed. After her death in 1962, which saw the castle pass to him although Benedict was the elder son, he began lengthy negotiations to bring about the handover.

The Trust was cautious: it felt that an endowment beyond the Nicolsons' means would be required, and it was also unsure that the garden was of sufficient importance to warrant acceptance. Sir George Taylor, Chairman of the National Trust's Gardens Committee doubted it was "one of the great gardens of England", and had to be persuaded of its merits by Sackville-West's close friend and one-time lover, the gardener Alvilde Lees-Milne. (Note: The Trust had, at this time, taken on relatively few gardens. Bodnant had come in 1949 and Nymans in 1954. Perhaps the most significant for Sissinghurst had been Hidcote, accepted largely at Sackville-West's urging through her membership of the Trust's Gardens Committee.) (Note: Lees-Milne's husband, James Lees-Milne, recorded a conversation with her in his diary entry for 23 June 1972: "A. in the car said we owed more to Harold and Vita than almost any of our older, now dead friends. A. said she owed what gardening credit she now enjoys entirely to Vita who taught her all she knows. I thought of what I owed Harold.") Discussions continued until, in April 1967, the castle, garden, and Sissinghurst Farm were finally accepted.

Although always intending to transfer Sissinghurst to the Trust, Nigel Nicolson undertook major remodelling at the castle. Unwilling to live in four separate structures – the Big Room, the Tower, the Priest's House, and the South Cottage – he built a substantial family home in the half of the entrance range that stood on the side of the gateway opposite from the library. He died at the castle on 23 September 2004.

=== National Trust: 1967–present ===
The National Trust took over the whole of Sissinghurst – its garden, farm, and buildings – in 1967. Since then, the number of visitors has steadily increased. Anne Scott-James, the author of the first non-Nicolson history of the garden, records 13,200 visitors in 1961, the year of Sackville-West's death, 47,100 in 1967, when the castle passed to the Trust, and 91,584 by 1973. It is now among the Trust's most popular properties, receiving nearly 200,000 visitors in 2017. Although the increased foot traffic has necessitated the replacement of the grass paths with York paving stones, the entry fees generate considerable income which, under the terms of the handover, can only be expended on Sissinghurst. In 2008, Adam Nicolson described the estate as "better funded than it has been since the 16th century". Major works of reconstruction, such as the restoration of the Tower brickwork, and the cataloguing and conservation of the collection of books in the library, have been made possible by the availability of these funds.

The property has an iconic status in LGBTQ culture; Adam Nicolson has noted "rivers of lesbians coming through the gate" each spring. The castle was one of the sites chosen in 2017 as a focus for the celebration of the LGBTQ history of Trust buildings. In the same year, the Trust opened the South Cottage to visitors for the first time. For 2019, the gardens are open to the public daily from 7 March to 31 October. It was ranked 42nd on the list of the Trust's most-visited sites in the 2021–2022 season, with over 150,000 visitors.

==== Adam Nicolson ====
Adam Nicolson, Nigel's son and the resident donor after his father's death, and his wife Sarah Raven, have sought to restore a form of traditional Wealden agriculture to Sissinghurst Farm. Their work to reunite the garden with its wider landscape is described in Adam's 2008 book, Sissinghurst: An Unfinished History, which won the Ondaatje Prize, and was the subject of a BBC Four documentary, Sissinghurst, in 2009. Their efforts have generated some controversy, reflecting the tension between the demands of traditional agricultural practices and the requirements of a major tourism destination in the 21st century.

== Architecture and landscape ==
=== Plan ===
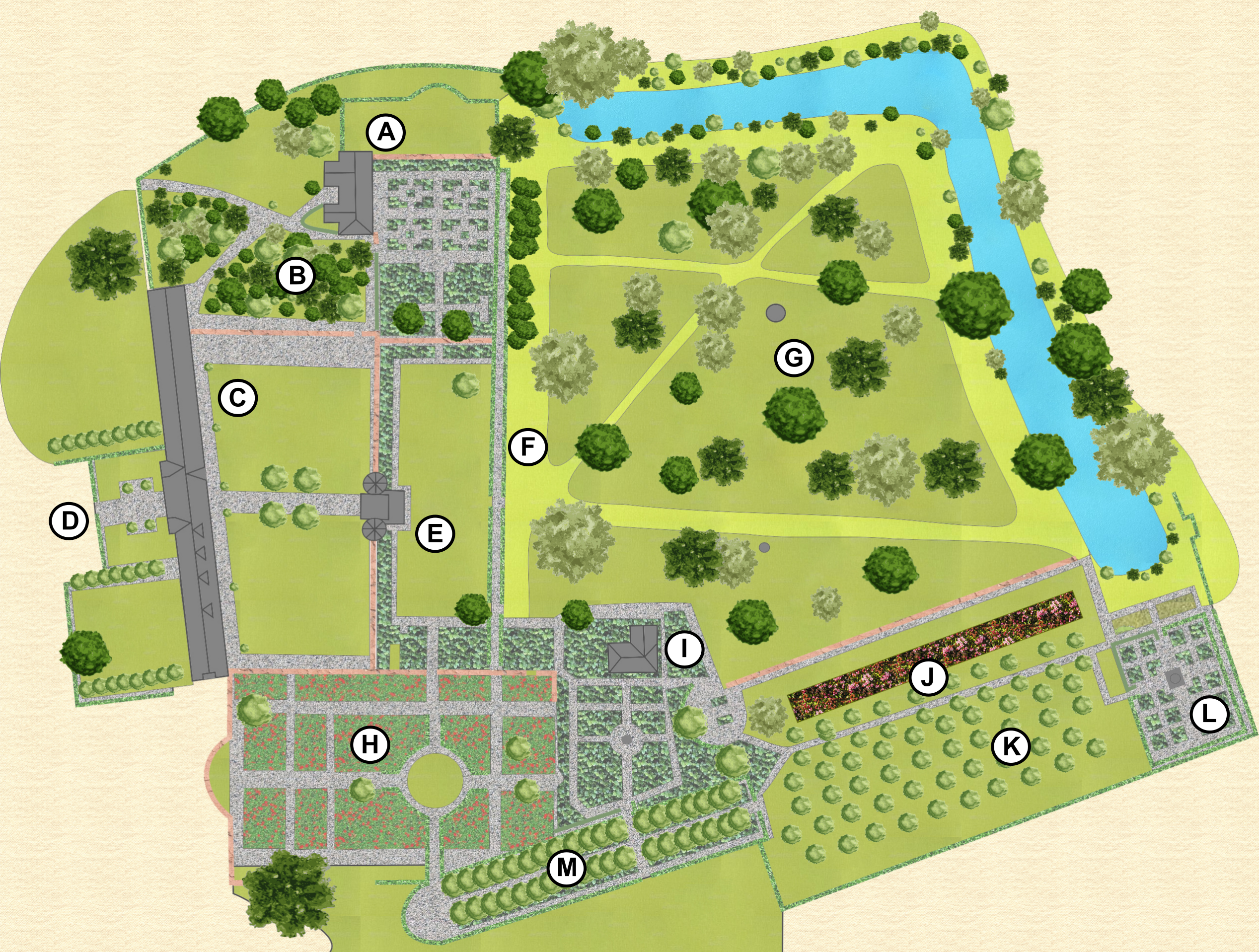
Key: A – Priest's House, Erechtheum and White Garden; B – Delos; C – Top Courtyard, West Range and Purple Border; D – Entrance; E – Tower and Lower Courtyard; F – Yew Walk; G – Orchard; H – Rose Garden; I – South Cottage and Cottage Garden; J – Moat Walk and Azaleas; K – Nuttery; L – Herb Garden; M – Lime Walk The top of the map points north-northeast, and the area shown is about 5 acres (0.020 km^{2}).

=== Buildings ===
The site is a Grade I registered garden, and many other structures within the garden are listed buildings in their own right.

==== West Range ====
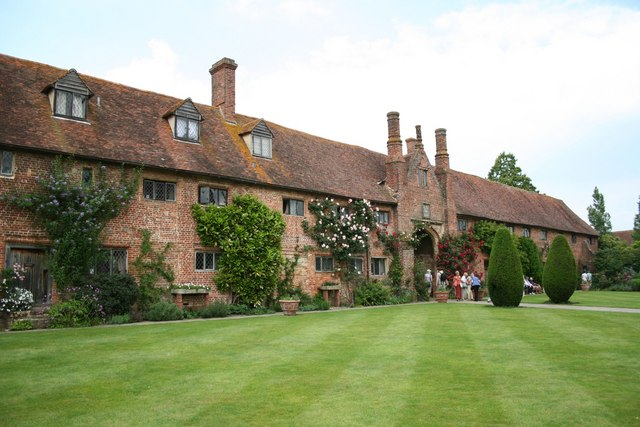
The West Range

The West Range forms part of Sir John Baker's original house of the 1530s. (Note: The National Heritage List for England gives a date of 1490, some forty years earlier.) Sackville-West and Nicolson enlisted architect A.R. Powys to help convert the stables into a library, known as the Big Room and containing an important literary collection. For the design of the Big Room, they also employed Philip Tilden. (Note: In 2017 the Libraries Curator of the National Trust, Mark Purcell, published a book, The Country House Library, which considered the history of such rooms from Roman times to the present. The front cover photograph for the work is of Sackville-West's study at the top of the tower at Sissinghurst.) The room as a whole is a recreation of Knole, "Vita's record of her disinheritance". Powys provided most of the architectural input into the conversion of the buildings at Sissinghurst, including the Priest's House and the South Cottage, as well as occasionally advising on elements of the design of the gardens. (Note: Powys' advice was not always welcomed. A design for a door in the Priest's House evoked a forthright response from Sackville-West. "It's simply bloody, all studded with nails, Ye Olde Tea Shoppe with a vengeance!") (Note: The library contains a portrait of Sackville-West from 1910 by Philip de László. Sackville-West's mother, Lady Sackville asked de László, "Do you not think that you owe it to your art and to her beauty to paint her without a fee?" Sackville-West disliked the painting and it was kept in an attic until the Trust placed it in the Big Room after taking ownership of Sissinghurst.)

The range is of brick and of two storeys, with attics and decorated gables and chimneys. The wing to the south was converted into a family home by Nigel Nicolson. The coat of arms of the Carnocks above the entrance archway was brought to Sissinghurst by Nicolson. (Note: Nicolson's father Arthur was made 1st Baron Carnock in 1916. Harold's diary entry for 20 April 1933 records, "Vita and the boys pick me up and we motor down to Sissinghurst. Arrive soon after eight. The arms are on the porch". The arms are dated 1548.) The West Range has a Grade I listing.

==== Tower ====
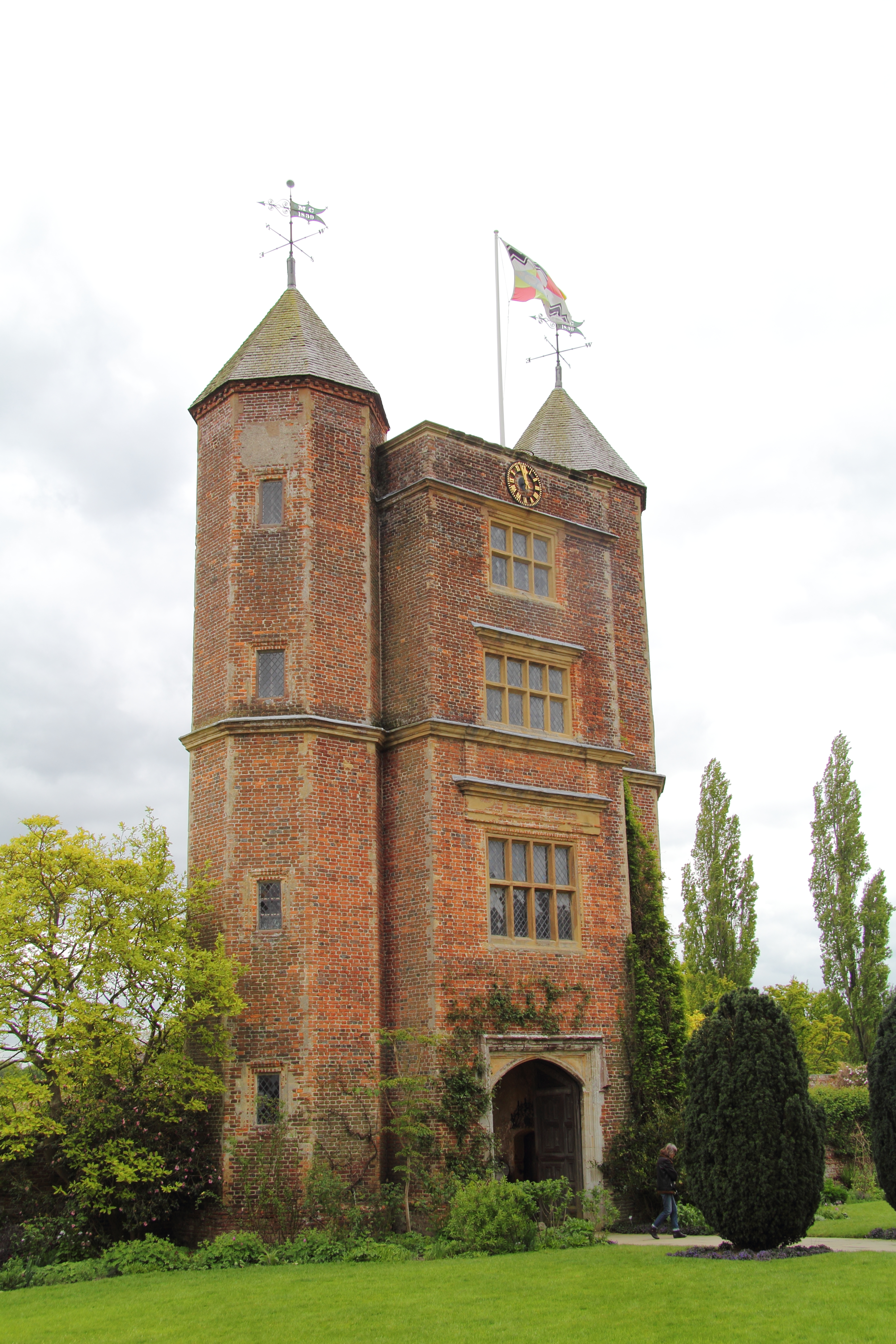
The Tower

The Tower is of brick and was the entrance to the cour d'honneur of the 1560s rebuilding. Of four storeys, it has recessed staircase turrets to each side, creating what the architectural historian Mark Girouard described as an "extraordinarily slender and elegant" appearance. The courtyard was open on the tower side, its three facades containing seven classical doorways. Girouard notes Horace Walpole's observation of 1752, "perfect and very beautiful". Such an arrangement of a three-sided courtyard with a prominent gatehouse set some way in front became popular from Elizabethan times, similar examples being Rushton Hall and the original Lanhydrock.

The Tower was Sackville-West's sanctum; her study was out of bounds to all but her dogs and a small number of guests by invitation. (Note: Nigel Nicolson recalled that, at her death, he had only been up to the tower room on about six occasions in 30 years.) Her writing room is maintained largely as it was at the time of her death. Nigel Nicolson records his discovery in the Tower of his mother's manuscript describing her affair with Violet Trefusis. This went on to form the basis of his book Portrait of a Marriage. (Note: Publication of the details of the Sackville-West/Nicolson marriage was controversial and Nigel Nicolson sustained much criticism; the actor Dirk Bogarde wrote, "Just when you think it is safe to stick your head above the parapet to get a gulp of air, bang! crash! wallop! and once more one is cowed by salvoes of the dreaded V-3s, Vita, Violet and Virginia . . . Why does an elderly gentleman see fit to rake through the ashes of his parents' love and expose their very private thoughts to all and sundry, for, as Vita would have said, 'the delectation of the common herd'?" Bernard Levin's Observer review was more coruscating still; "(Nicolson) tells us that when he found the diary he 'read it through to the end without stirring from her table.' He should then have put it in the fire". Harold Nicolson's biographer James Lees-Milne recorded a lunch with Nigel Nicolson and a subsequent discussion with two other friends in his diary entry for 14 March 1973; "Both think Nigel ought not to cash in on his parents' love life. I am not sure. I think the book, which is going to be the book of 1973, will enhance [Vita's] ultimate reputation, though not immediately".) The clock, below the Tower parapet, was installed in 1949. A plaque is affixed to the arch of the Tower; the words were chosen by Harold Nicolson: "Here lived V. Sackville-West who made this garden". Nigel Nicolson always felt that the memorial failed to acknowledge his father's contribution. The Tower has a Grade I listing.

==== Priest's House ====
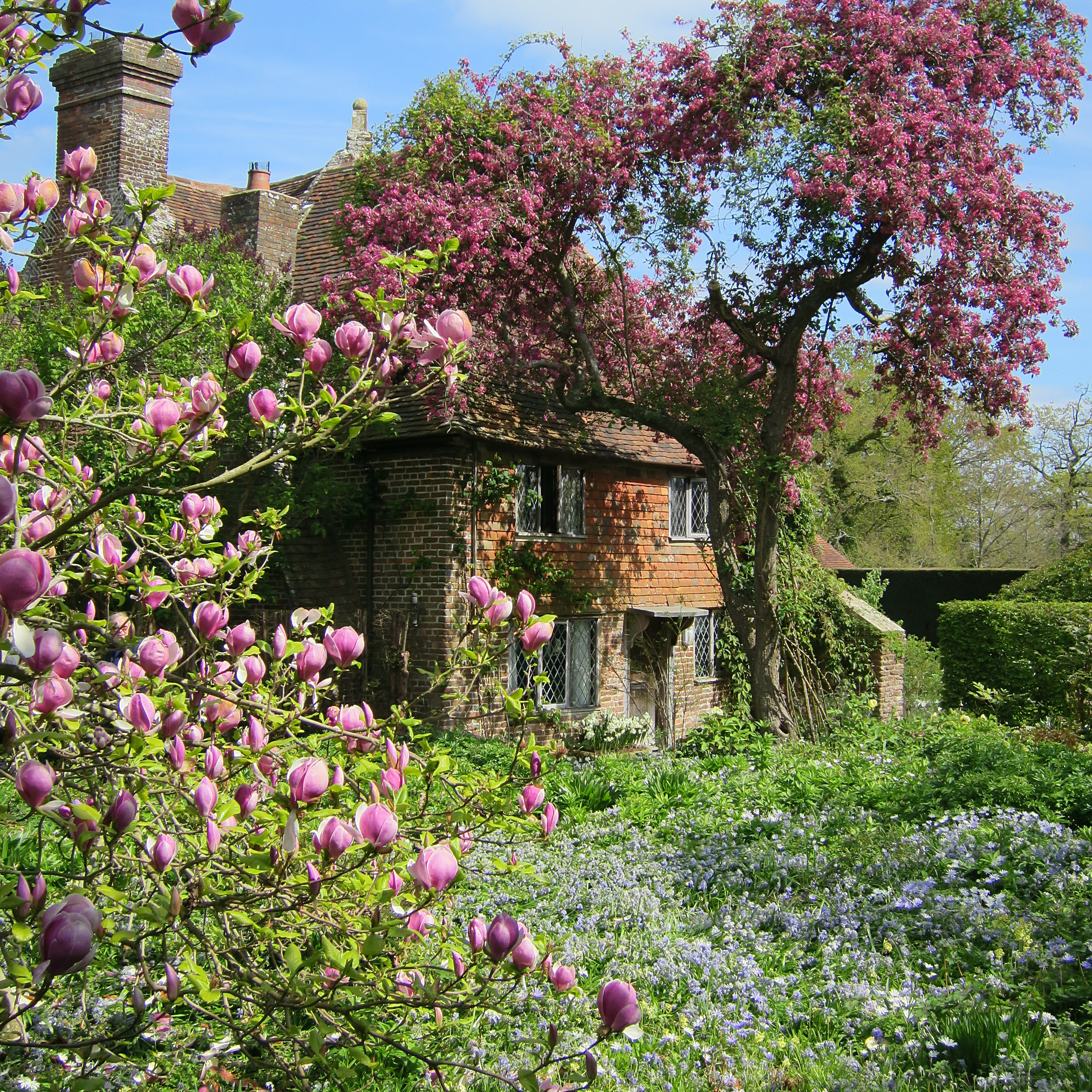
The Priest's House

The architectural historian John Newman suggests that this building was a "viewing pavilion or lodge". Its name derives from the tradition that it was used to house a Catholic priest, the Baker family having been Catholic adherents. Sackville-West and Nicolson converted the cottage to provide accommodation for their sons, and the family kitchen and dining room. Of red brick and two storeys, Historic England suggests that the building may originally have been attached to Sir Richard Baker's 1560s house but Newman disagrees.

==== South Cottage ====
This building formed the southeast corner of the courtyard enclosure buildings. It was restored by Beale & Son, builders from Tunbridge Wells, and provided the pair with separate bedrooms, a shared sitting room, and Nicolson's writing room. His diary entry for 20 April 1933 records: "My new wing has been done. The sitting room is lovely ... My bedroom, w.c. and bathroom are divine". Of two storeys in red brick, with an extension dating from the 1930s, South Cottage has a Grade II* listing.

=== Gardens ===
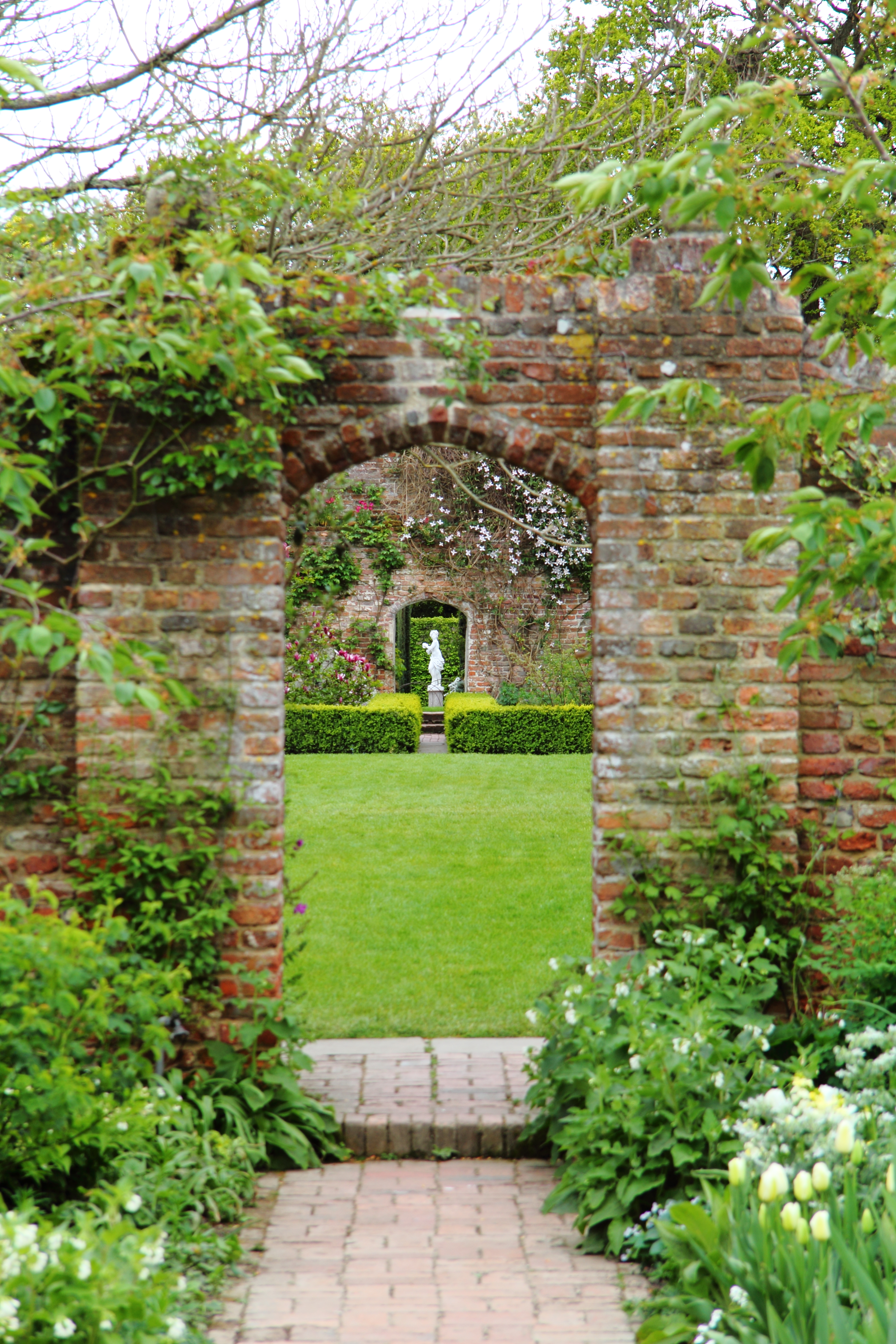
An axial walk

Although the estate as a whole is 450 acres (1.8 km^{2}), the gardens themselves occupy only 5 acres (0.020 km^{2}). Anne Scott-James sets out the principles of the design: "a garden of formal structure, of a private and secret nature, truly English in character, and plant[ed] with romantic profusion". As gardeners and landscapers, both Sackville-West and Nicolson were amateurs. Nicolson largely undertook the design and Sackville-West the planting. The landscape is designed as a series of "garden rooms", each with a different character of colour or theme, the enclosures being high clipped hedges and pink brick walls. The rooms and "doors" are so arranged as to offer glimpses into other parts of the garden.

Sackville-West described the overall design: "a combination of long axial walks, usually with terminal points, and the more intimate surprise of small geometrical gardens opening off them, rather as the rooms of an enormous house would open off the corridors". Nicolson considered the garden's success was down to this "succession of privacies: the forecourt, the first arch, the main court, the tower arch, the lawn, the orchard. All a series of escapes from the world, giving the impression of cumulative escape". In the White Garden and along some paths in other gardens, the flower beds were set off from the paths by closely clipped low square hedges of box.

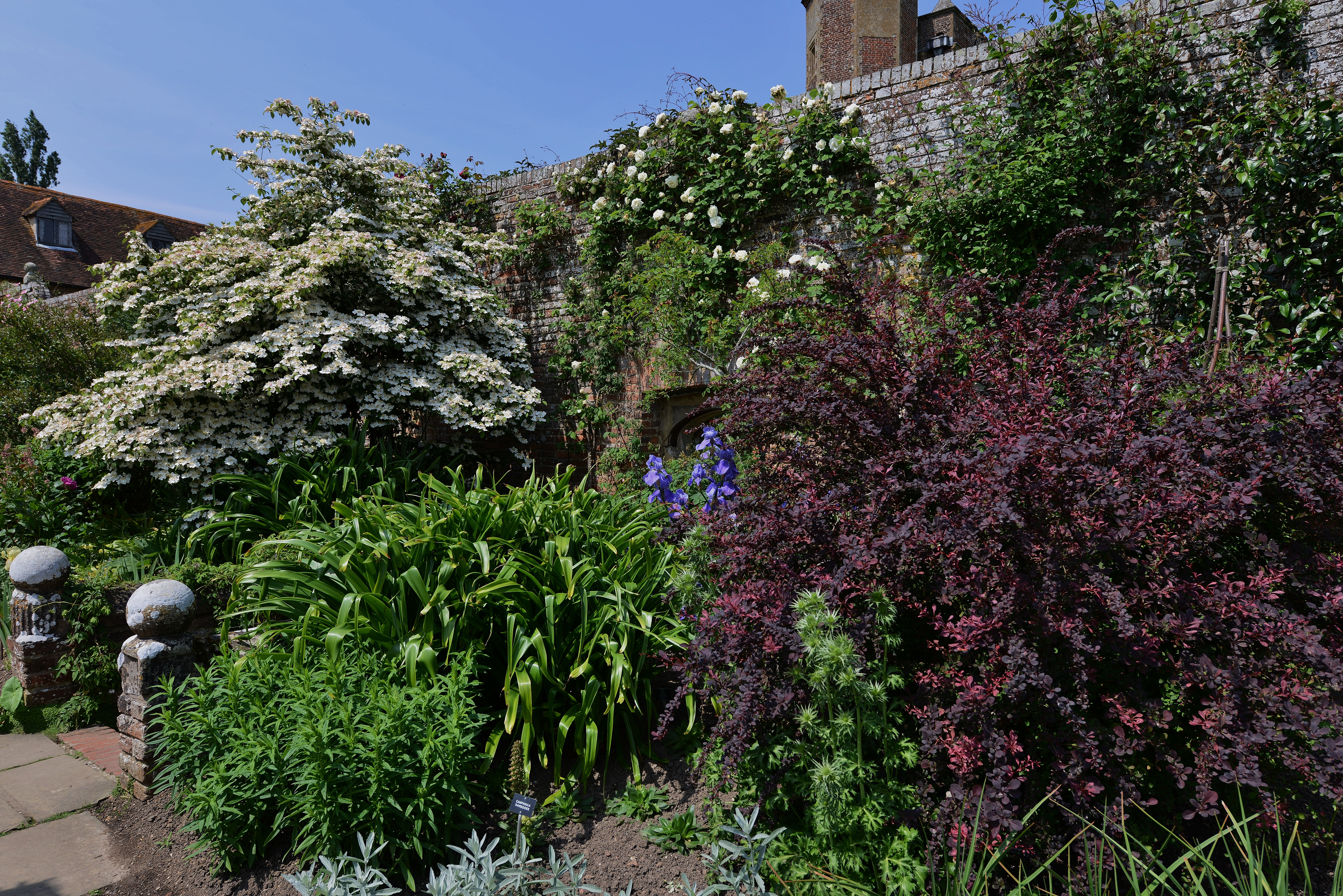
"Cram, cram, cram, every chink and cranny."

Sackville-West's planting philosophy is summed up in the advice from one of her gardening columns in the Observer: "Cram, cram, cram, every chink and cranny". Gardener Sarah Raven (Adam Nicolson's wife) notes the use of the vertical dimension, as well as horizontal paths, in her planting. Assisted by the number of walls still standing from the Tudor manor, and constructing more of her own, Sackville-West remarked "I see we are going to have heaps of wall space for climbing things."

Old roses formed the centrepiece of the planting, and their history appealed to her as much as their appearance did: "there is nothing scrimpy or stingy about them. They have a generosity which is as desirable in plants as in people", and ultimately around 200 varieties were grown at Sissinghurst.

==== Influences ====
Edwin Lutyens, long-time gardening partner of Gertrude Jekyll, was a friend to both Sackville-West and Nicolson and a frequent visitor to Long Barn, and gave advice regarding Sissinghurst. (Note: Christopher Hussey records Lutyens sketching the design for the Cenotaph when at dinner with Vita Sackville-West on the day Lloyd George had awarded him the commission.) Sackville-West denied that Jekyll's work had an impact on her own designs, but Nigel Nicolson described Lutyens' influence as "pervasive". Fleming and Gore go further, suggesting that the use of groupings of colours "followed Jekyll"; "a purple border, a cottage garden in red, orange and yellow, a walled garden pink [and] purple, a white garden, a herb garden". Scott-James notes however that herbaceous borders, "Jekyll's speciality", were much disliked by Sackville-West. Other influencers and friends were the noted plantswoman Norah Lindsay, the plant collector Collingwood Ingram, who was their neighbour at Benenden, and Reginald Cooper, one of Nicolson's closest friends, whose earlier garden at Cothay Manor in Somerset has been described as the "Sissinghurst of the West Country". Sackville-West's considerable knowledge of old roses was deepened by her friendship with Edward Bunyard, plantsman, epicure, and the author of Old Garden Roses, who was a frequent visitor. The historian Peter Davey places the garden at the very end of a tradition of Arts and Crafts gardening which by the 1930s, in the face of changes in "taste and economics", had almost come to its close.

Formality is often essential to the plan of a garden but never to the arrangement of its flowers and shrubs.

— William Robinson, author of The English Flower Garden and a major influence on Sackville-West's planting style

The concept of "garden rooms" has been dated to the Romans, who included rooms within some homes that opened on one side onto a garden. The horticultural scholar and gardener Marie-Luise Gothein identified such a room at Pliny's Villa Tusci, in her study A History of Garden Art. In the late 19th century, reaction set in against both the Victorian fashion for elaborate bedding and Italianate formality, and the earlier 18th century landscape gardening modelled on the paintings of Claude Lorrain and Nicolas Poussin. This led in part to a concept of the "garden room" (distinct from the architectural concept of a sunroom as a garden room) as a space out of doors, in which paths, corresponding to halls in a house, lead to enclosed gardens within the garden as a whole, conceived of as rooms. The architect Hermann Muthesius described the style which developed into the Arts and Crafts approach in his Das englische Haus ("The English House"): "the garden is seen as a continuation of the rooms of the house, almost a series of ... outdoor rooms, each of which is self-contained". A number of pre-Sissinghurst gardeners, including Jekyll and Lawrence Johnston, had designed in this style, and much of their work was known to Sackville-West and Nicolson. This landscaping feature has since become an established one in garden design.

Many of the gardening themes developed at Sissinghurst were conceived during Sackville-West's and Nicolson's time at Long Barn: the prominence of roses, the emphasis on "rectilinear perspectives" through axial paths, and an informal, massed planting approach. Jane Brown suggests that "without Long Barn there would have been no Sissinghurst."

==== Head gardeners ====
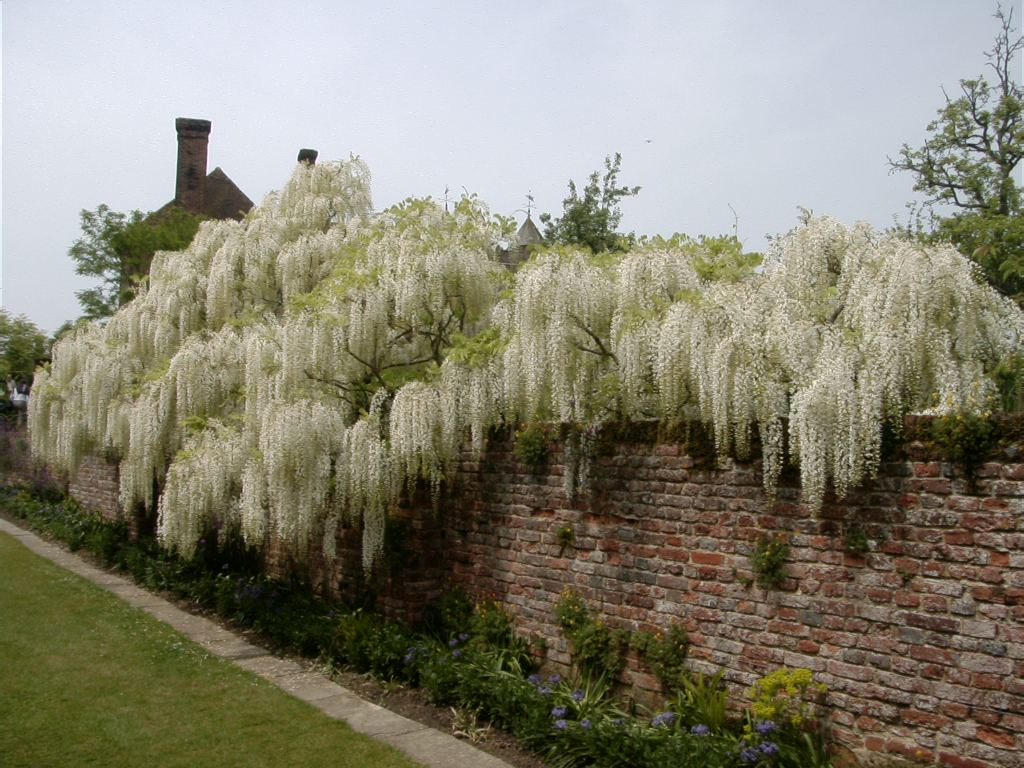
Wisteria on the Moat Walk

John Vass, appointed head gardener in 1939, left in 1957. (Note: The accounts of Vass's departure are conflicting. Adam Nicolson suggests that Vass and Sackville-West disagreed about the Sissinghurst Flower Show. Jane Brown and Victoria Glendinning support this interpretation, but Brown also suggests that a dislike of Vass's wife was a factor, although adding that the parting of the ways was amicable. Glendinning disagrees, and suggests Sackville-West's suspicion that Vass was a communist led to his sacking: "Well, I never loved Vass, you know. He was a convenient co-operator ... but a cold-blooded animal – a lizard, dry, rustling, shooting a long tongue – and would have strung me up à la lanterne as soon as not".) Called up to the RAF in 1941, he had urged that the hedges be maintained, confident that everything else in the garden could be restored after the war. Ronald Platt succeeded him from 1957 to 1959. In 1959 Pamela Schwerdt and Sibylle Kreutzberger were appointed as joint replacements. They remained at Sissinghurst until 1991, their contributions, "as much, if not more than Vita's, mak[ing] it the most admired and popular 20th-century garden in England". In 2006 they were awarded the Royal Horticultural Society's Victoria Medal of Honour for their work at Sissinghurst. The pair were followed as head gardener by Sarah Cook, who was succeeded by Alexis Datta.

In 2014, Troy Scott Smith, previously head gardener at Bodnant, was appointed – the first male head gardener since the 1950s. He has written of the challenges of maintaining the garden "in the manner of its creator, after they have gone". In 2018 Scott Smith announced plans to extend the flowering season at Sissinghurst beyond the autumn period established by Schwerdt and Kreutzberger, into the winter months, allowing for year-round opening of the garden. The gardening writer and landscape critic Tim Richardson, writing in 2015, described Scott Smith's re-making of the garden: "Sissinghurst, more than any other garden I know, inspires extremes of emotion. There is a feeling that this is Britain's leading garden – and so, arguably, the world's, a status that has proven to be both a great boon and an albatross around its neck". Scott Smith's plans include the reinstatement of every species of rose known to have been grown by Sackville-West. A new history of the garden by Sarah Raven was published in 2014. Sissinghurst continues to exert considerable influence, being described as a "Mecca" and a "place of pilgrimage" for gardeners from around the world and encouraging many imitators. (Note: Sissinghurst has been particularly influential on garden design in the United States. One example among many is Hollister House Garden in Connecticut.)

==== Top Courtyard and Tower Lawn ====
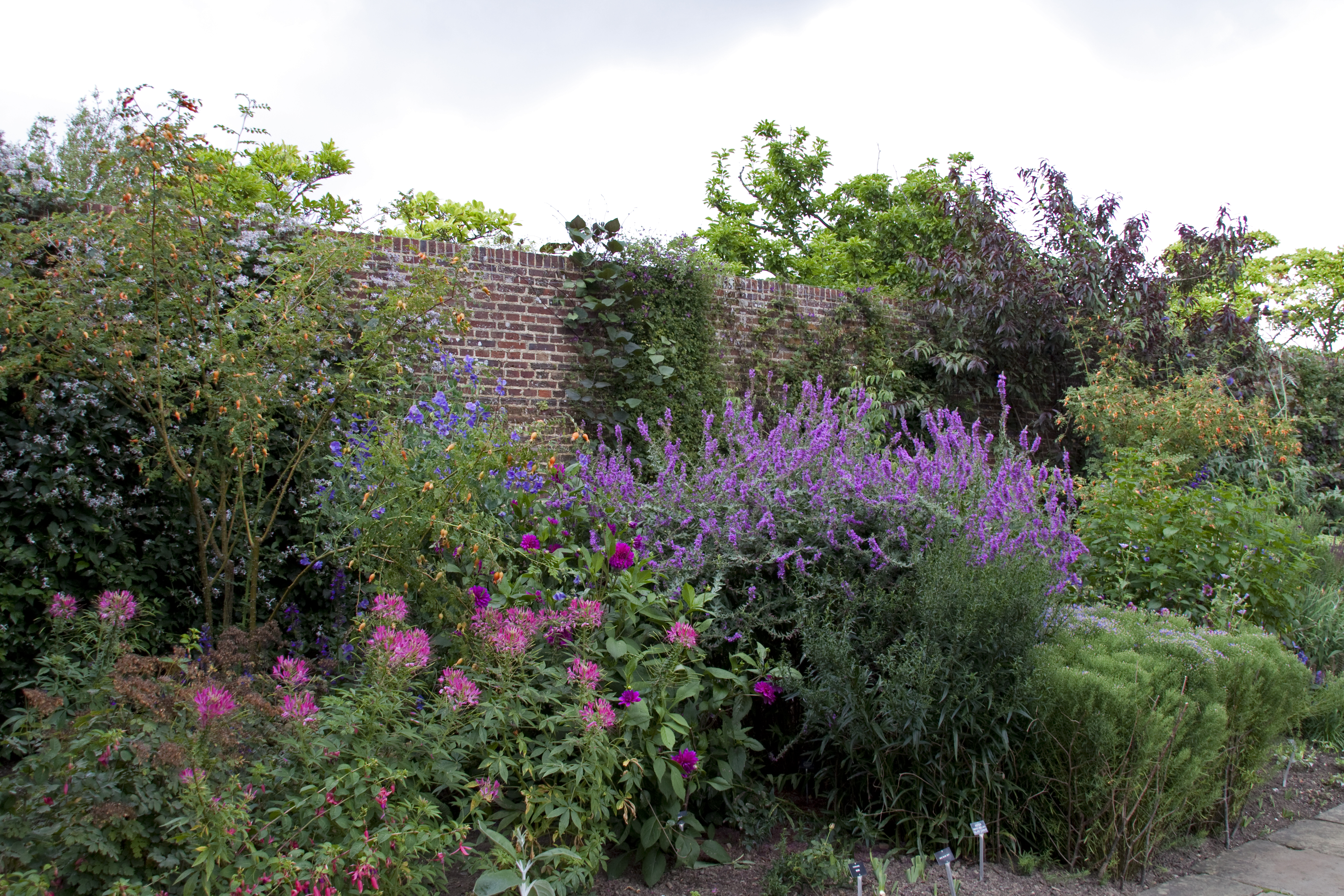
The Purple Border

Entered through the archway in the West Range, that had been blocked for over 100 years before Sackville-West and Nicolson's arrival, the Top Courtyard is dominated by the Tower. Planted against a new wall constructed on ancient foundations is the Purple Border, a colour palette deliberately chosen by Sackville-West in defiance of Gertrude Jekyll's dictum against massing purple flowers. The gardening writer Tony Lord considers it "the courtyard's greatest glory". The height of the Tower attracts considerable wind which necessitates intensive staking of the plants, particularly the taller specimens such as Sackville-West's much-favoured Rosa moyesii. (Note: Sackville-West often employed gardening metaphors, once calling her vacillating cousin Eddie Sackville-West "as floppy as an unstaked delphinium in a gale".) On the opposite side of the Tower is the Tower Lawn, also known as the Lower Courtyard; Nicolson emphasised that "the English lawn is the basis of our garden design". The west–east vista from the Top Courtyard, through the Tower gateway, across the Tower Lawn, and to the statue of Dionysus across the moat, forms one of the most important horizontal axes. It bisects the north–south axis running from the White Garden, across the Tower Lawn, to the Roundel in the Rose Garden. In the southwestern corner of the Tower Lawn is a small garden known as the Sunk Garden. It was created in 1930 as the Lion Pond, but the pond was prone to leaking and was drained in 1939. The site was subsequently considered for planting what became the White Garden, but was ultimately rejected as too confined, shady, and damp. The Trust is considering reinstatement of the pool.

==== White Garden ====
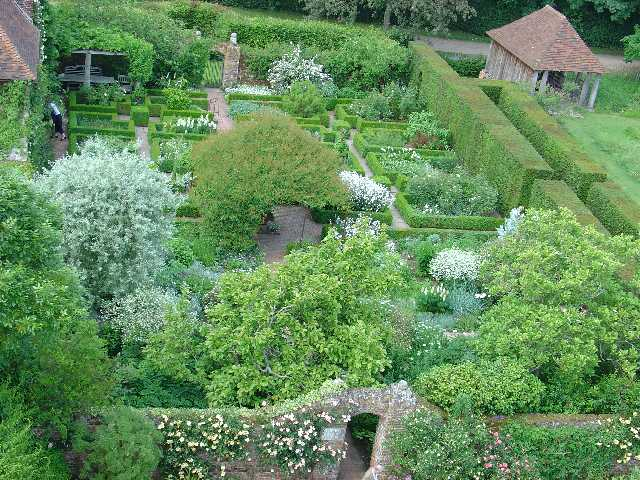
The White Garden viewed from the Tower

"A symphony in subtle shades of white and green", the White Garden is considered the "most renowned" and most influential of all of Sissinghurst's garden rooms. Planned before the war, it was completed in the winter of 1949–1950. Using a palette of white, silver, grey, and green, it has been called "one of Vita and Harold's most beautiful and romantic visions". Sackville-West recorded her original inspiration in a letter to Nicolson dated 12 December 1939: "I have got what I hope will be a lovely scheme for it: all white flowers, with some clumps of very pale pink". (Note: At this point, the plan was to construct the White Garden on the site of the recently drained Lion Pond.) The concept of single-colour gardens had enjoyed some popularity at the end of the 19th century, but few such gardens remained when Sissinghurst was designed. Influences for the White Garden include Hidcote and Phyllis Reiss's garden at Tintinhull, both of which Vita had seen. Gertrude Jekyll had discussed the concept, but argued for varying the white palette with the use of blue or yellow plants, advice followed by Reiss. But neither Hidcote nor Tintinhull equals the "full-scale symphony" of the White Garden at Sissinghurst. A more prosaic motivation for the colour scheme was to provide reflected illumination for Sackville-West and Nicolson as they made their way from their bedrooms at the South Cottage to the Priest's House for dinner.

For the last 40 years of my life I have broken my back, my fingernails, and sometimes my heart, in the practical pursuit of my favourite occupation.

— Sackville-West's reflections on Sissinghurst towards the end of her life

The focal point of the garden was originally four almond trees, encased in a canopy of the white rose, Rosa mulliganii. By the 1960s, the weight of the roses had severely weakened the trees, and they were replaced with an iron arbour designed by Nigel Nicolson. Beneath the arbour is sited a Ming dynasty vase bought in Cairo. A lead statue of a Vestal Virgin, cast by Toma Rosandić from the wooden original which is in the Big Room, presides over the garden. Sackville-West intended that the statue should be enveloped by a weeping pear tree, Pyrus salicifolia 'Pendula', and the present tree was planted after her original was destroyed in the Great Storm of 1987. Lord considers the White Garden "the most ambitious and successful of its time, the most entrancing of its type".

A possibly apocryphal story records a visit by the colour-loving gardener Christopher Lloyd, during which he is supposed to have scattered seeds of brightly coloured nasturtiums across the lawn. Troy Scott Smith, the current head gardener, is undertaking a major research project on the history of the White Garden with the intention of recreating the original planting scheme in its entirety. This project has seen the number of plants being propagated in the Sissinghurst nursery rise from 400 to over 530.

==== Rose Garden ====
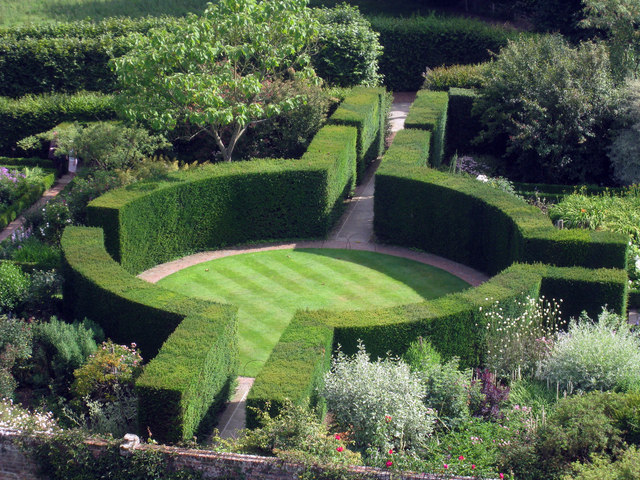
The Roundel in the Rose Garden

The Rose Garden was constructed on the site of the old kitchen garden from 1937. It terminates the north–south axis running from the White Garden and concludes with a brick wall, designed by A. R. Powys and known as the Powys Wall, constructed in 1935. Old garden roses, those bred before 1867, formed the heart of the garden's planting. Such roses appealed not only for their lavish appearance, but also for their history. The informal and unstructured massing of the plants was Sackville-West's deliberate choice, and has become one of Sissinghurst's defining features. Roses were supplied by, among others, Hilda Murrell of Edwin Murrell Ltd., notable rose growers in Shropshire, and the florist Constance Spry from her home Winkfield Place. In addition to using established suppliers and receiving plants as gifts from friends, Sackville-West sometimes sourced specimens herself. Sarah Raven records Sackville-West digging up the hybrid perpetual rose 'Souvenir du Docteur Jamain' at an old nursery; (Note: Sackville-West recounted: "I found him growing against the office wall of an old nursery. No one knew what he was; no one seemed to care; no one knew his name; no one had troubled to propagate him. Could I dig him up, I asked? Well, if you like to risk it, they said, shrugging their shoulders; it's a very old plant, with a woody stiff root. I risked it; Docteur Jamain survived his removal; and now has a flourishing progeny in my garden.") Anne Scott-James noted that the rose had passed out of commerce and it was Sackville-West who returned it to cultivation. The Rose Garden is divided by the Roundel, constructed of yew hedging by Nicolson and Nigel in 1933. As elsewhere in the garden, the Trust has replaced the original grass paths with stone and brick, to cope with the increases in visitor numbers. Scott-James considered the roses in the Rose Garden "one of the finest collections in the world". The writer Jane Brown describes the Rose Garden, more than any other including the White, as expressing "the essence of Vita's gardening personality, just as her writing-room enshrines her poetic ghost".

==== Delos and Erechtheum ====
Delos, between the Priest's House and the courtyard wall, was the one area of the garden that neither Sackville-West nor Nicolson considered a success. She explained its origins in an article in Country Life in 1942 as being inspired by the terraced ruins covered with wild flowers she had observed on the island of Delos. Neither the shade nor the soil, nor its inter-relationships with other parts of the garden, have proved satisfactory, either in the Nicolson's time or subsequently. The Erechtheum, named after one of the temples at the Acropolis, is a vine-covered loggia and was used as a place for eating out of doors.

==== Cottage and Herb Gardens ====
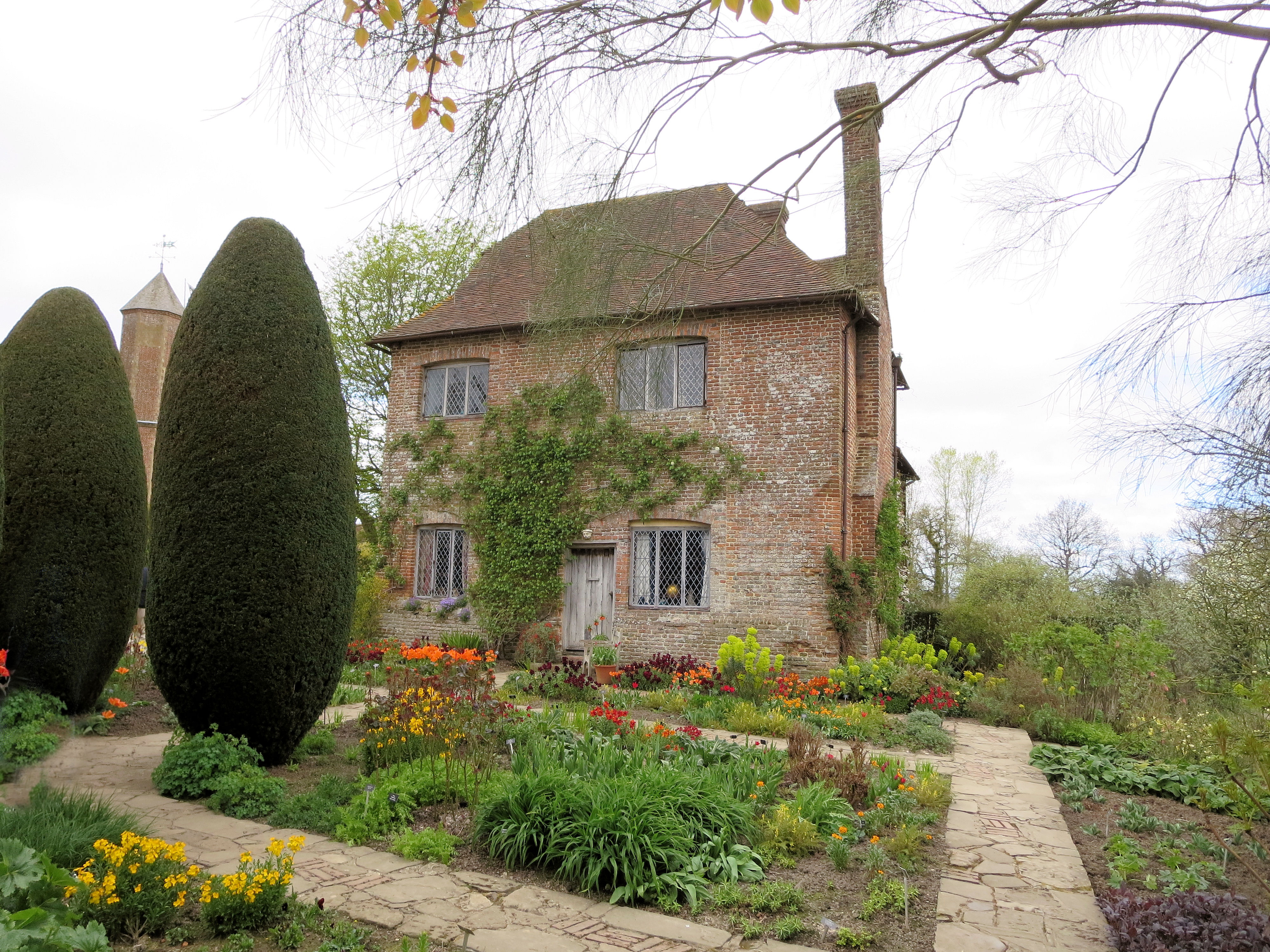
The South Cottage from the Cottage Garden

The dominating colours in the Cottage Garden are hot saturated shades of red, orange, and yellow, a colour scheme that both Sackville-West and Nicolson claimed as their own conception. Lord considers it as much a traditional "cottage garden as Marie Antoinette was a milkmaid". Here, as elsewhere, Sackville-West was much influenced by William Robinson, a gardener she greatly admired and who had done much to popularise the concept of the cottage garden. It contains four beds, surrounded by simple paths, with planting in colours that Sackville-West described as those of the sunset. Plants include a range of dahlias, a particular favourite of Nicolson's, and the red-hot poker, which he despised. In a 1937 letter to his wife he observed, "I think the secret of your gardening is simply that you have the courage to abolish ugly or unsuccessful flowers. Except for those beastly red-hot pokers which you have a weakness for, there is not an ugly flower in the whole place."

The Herb Garden contains sage, thyme, hyssop, fennel and an unusual seat built around a camomile bush. Known to the family as Edward the Confessor's chair, it was constructed by Copper, the Nicolson's chauffeur. Originally laid out in the 1930s, the garden was revitalised by John Vass in the years immediately after the Second World War. The Lion Basin in the centre of the garden was brought back from Turkey in 1914. Most of the over one hundred herbs in the garden are now started in the nurseries and planted out at appropriate times of year.

==== Walks, the Nuttery, and the Moat ====
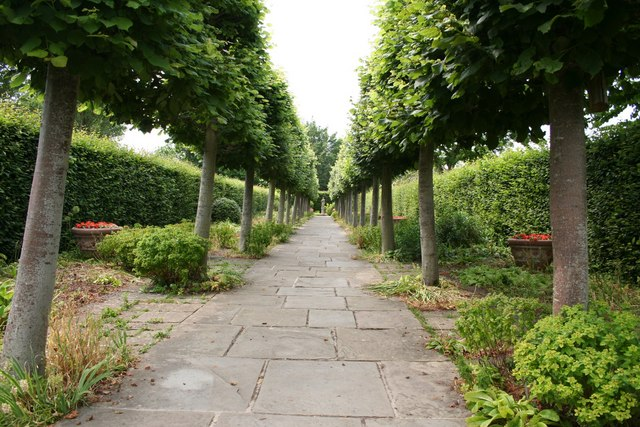
Nicolson's Lime Walk, which he called "My Life's Work"

The Lime Walk, also known as the Spring Garden, was the one part of Sissinghurst where Nicolson undertook the planting as well as the design. He had originally intended a single axis running straight from the Rose Garden, through the Cottage Garden, and then through the Nuttery to the moat, but the topography of the site precluded that. Instead, an angled walk was established in the mid-1930s, and substantially replanted in 1945–1962. Sackville-West was critical of the angularity of the design, comparing it to Platform 5 at Charing Cross station, but treasured it as her husband's creation. "I walked down the Spring Garden and all your little flowers tore and bit at my heart. I do love you so, Hadji. (Note: "Hadji", meaning pilgrim, was Sir Arthur Nicolson's nickname for his son which Sackville-West adopted and used throughout their marriage. His nickname for her was "Mar", a diminutive first used by her mother.) It is quite simple: I do love you so. Just that." The limes are pleached and the dominant plant is Euphorbia polychroma 'Major'. Nicolson kept meticulous gardening records of his efforts in the Lime Walk from 1947 to the late 1950s and, providing consolation after the end of his parliamentary career, (Note: Nicolson's close contemporary and sometime friend Chips Channon recorded Nicolson's defeat at the Croydon by-election in his diary entry for 12–14 March 1948. "Of course that nice silly Harold Nicolson was the worst candidate in living memory. How humiliating for him, though his ridiculous behaviour as the Labour Candidate cannot altogether explain the big swing-over. What can he think? He must hide his bald pink head in shame.") he described the walk as "My Life's Work".

The Yew Walk runs parallel to the Tower Lawn. Its narrow width has been problematic, and by the late 1960s the yew hedges were failing. Extensive pruning proved successful in revitalising the avenue.

The Nuttery was famed for its carpet of polyanthus. Nicolson called it "the loveliest planting scheme in the whole world". Unlike the other gardens, where flowering plants were placed within flower beds, in the Nuttery and the Orchard plants were allowed to spread across lawns as though they were growing in the wild. By the 1960s, the plants were dying, and attempts to improve the soil did not assist. The primrose carpet was replaced in the 1970s by a mixture of woodland flowers and grasses.

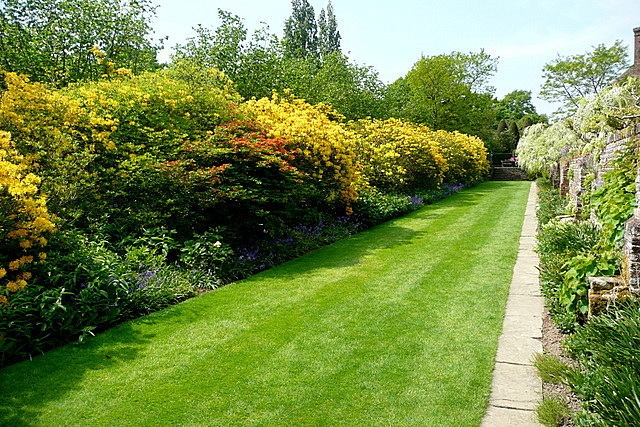
The Moat Walk – "the English lawn is the basis of our garden design"

The Moat Walk stands on the old bowling green constructed by Sir Richard Baker in the 1560s and his reconstructed moat wall provides the axis. (Note: Jane Brown suggests it is older, dating from the house of the de Berhams.) The azaleas were bought with the £100 Heinemann prize Sackville-West received in 1946 for her last published poem, The Land. The wisteria were a gift from her mother, Lady Sackville, as were the six bronze vases. (Note: The vases were part of a larger set, commissioned by Sir Richard Wallace and copied from originals at Versailles for his garden at the Château de Bagatelle. Those at Sissinghurst were inherited by Lady Sackville, and others from the set are located at Lanhydrock and in the Wallace Collection.) A bench designed by Lutyens terminates one end of the walk, the other focal point being the statue of Dionysus across the moat. The two arms of the moat that remain from the medieval house are populated by goldfish, carp, and golden orfe.

==== Orchard ====
The Orchard was an unproductive area of fruit trees when the Nicolsons arrived. The unplanned layout was retained as a contrast to the formality of most of the garden; the fruit trees were paired with climbing roses and the area provided space for the many gifts of plants and trees they received. The rose Rosa filipes 'Kiftsgate', a present from Sackville-West's friend and fellow gardener Heather Muir of Kiftsgate Court, is one example. This part of the garden suffered particularly severe losses in the Great Storm of 1987 and much replanting has taken place. The Orchard is the setting for two structures planned by Nigel Nicolson and commissioned in memory of his father: the boathouse and the gazebo. The gazebo, of 1969, is by Francis Pym and has a candlesnuffer roof intended to evoke those of Kentish oast houses. The boathouse, of timber construction and with Tuscan colonnades, dates from 2002 and is by the local architectural firm Purcell Miller Tritton.

== Plants ==
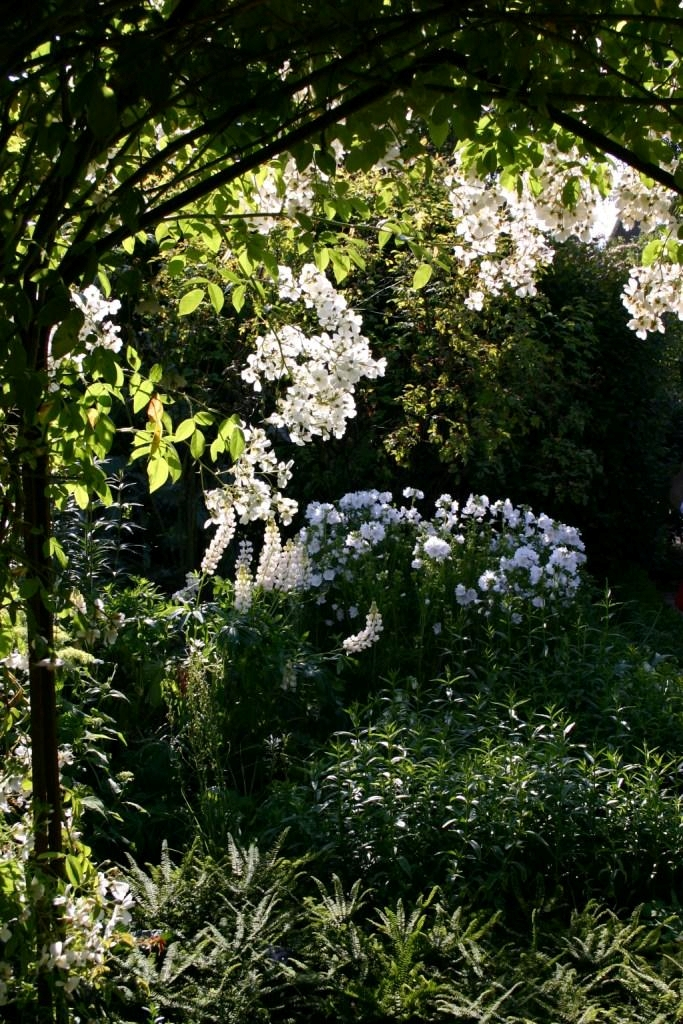
Rosa mulliganii (at top) grows on an arbour in the White Garden.

Tony Lord has noted that Sackville-West and Nicolson intended the gardens at Sissinghurst to be a source of personal enjoyment, rather than to be a public garden displaying rare plants. Aside from Sackville-West's interest in collecting and preserving rare varieties of old roses, the other garden plants were selected primarily for their abilities to look good and grow successfully in their intended planting sites, as opposed to assembling a collection of rare plants from around the world. Later, in the 1960s, Pamela Schwerdt and Sibylle Kreutzberger decided to propagate the most successful flowering plant varieties in order to offer them for sale and make them more easily available to amateur gardeners.

=== Roses ===
The collection of rose varieties at Sissinghurst is considered to be extraordinary as well as to encapsulate Sackville-West's approach to gardening. In 1953, John Vass counted 194 rose varieties on the property. (Note: Vass retained an annotated copy of the Hilling's nursery catalogue from 1953. His notes recorded that 170 of the roses within it were planted at Sissinghurst and he recalled at least 24 other varieties not mentioned in the catalogue.) A few modern rose varieties are included: the floribunda rose 'Iceberg' is planted in the White Garden, having been supplied by Hilda Murrell to supplement plant losses after a hard winter following Sackville-West's death, and the bright scarlet climbing hybrid tea 'Allen Chandler' grows on each side of the entrance gate to the Top Courtyard.

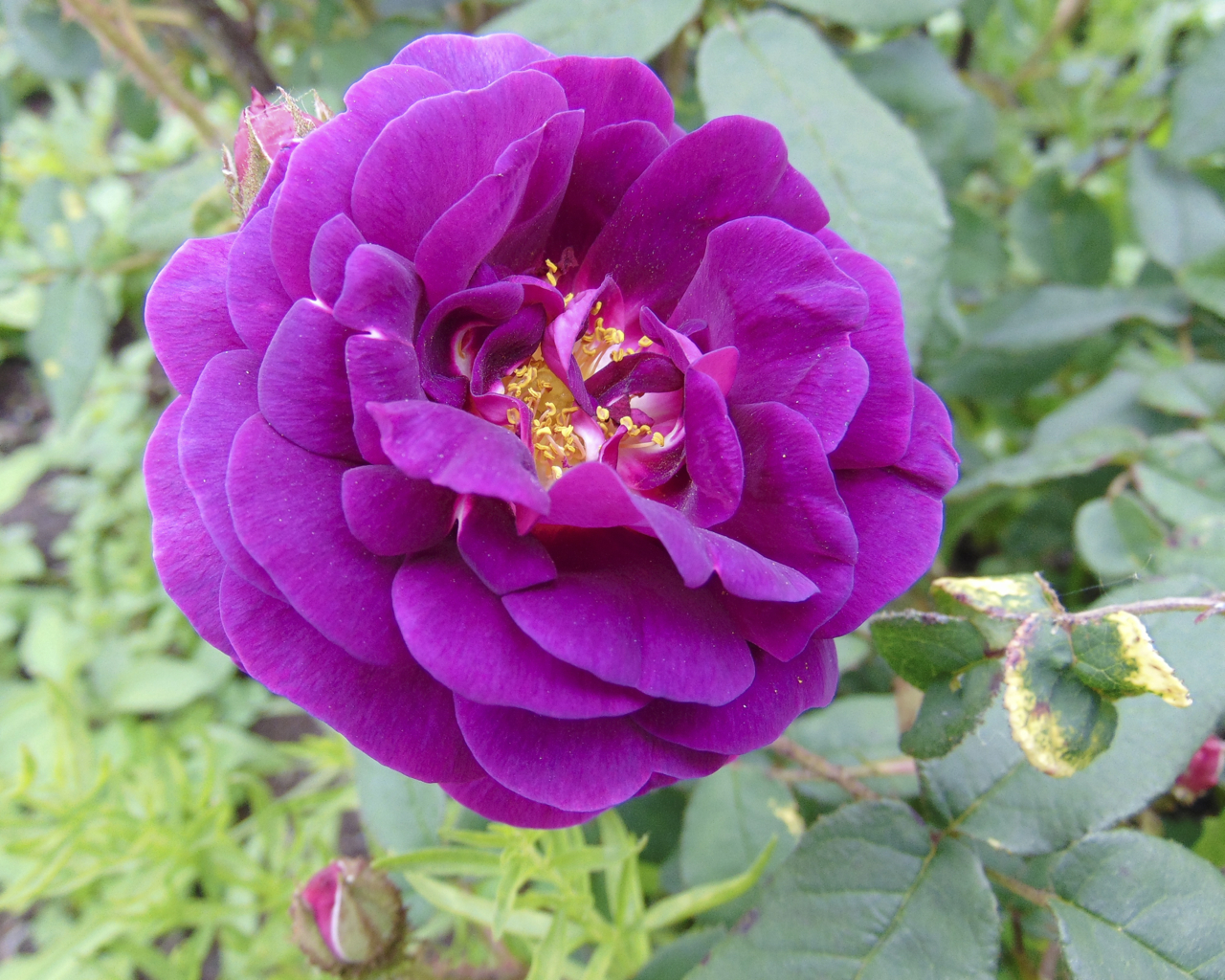
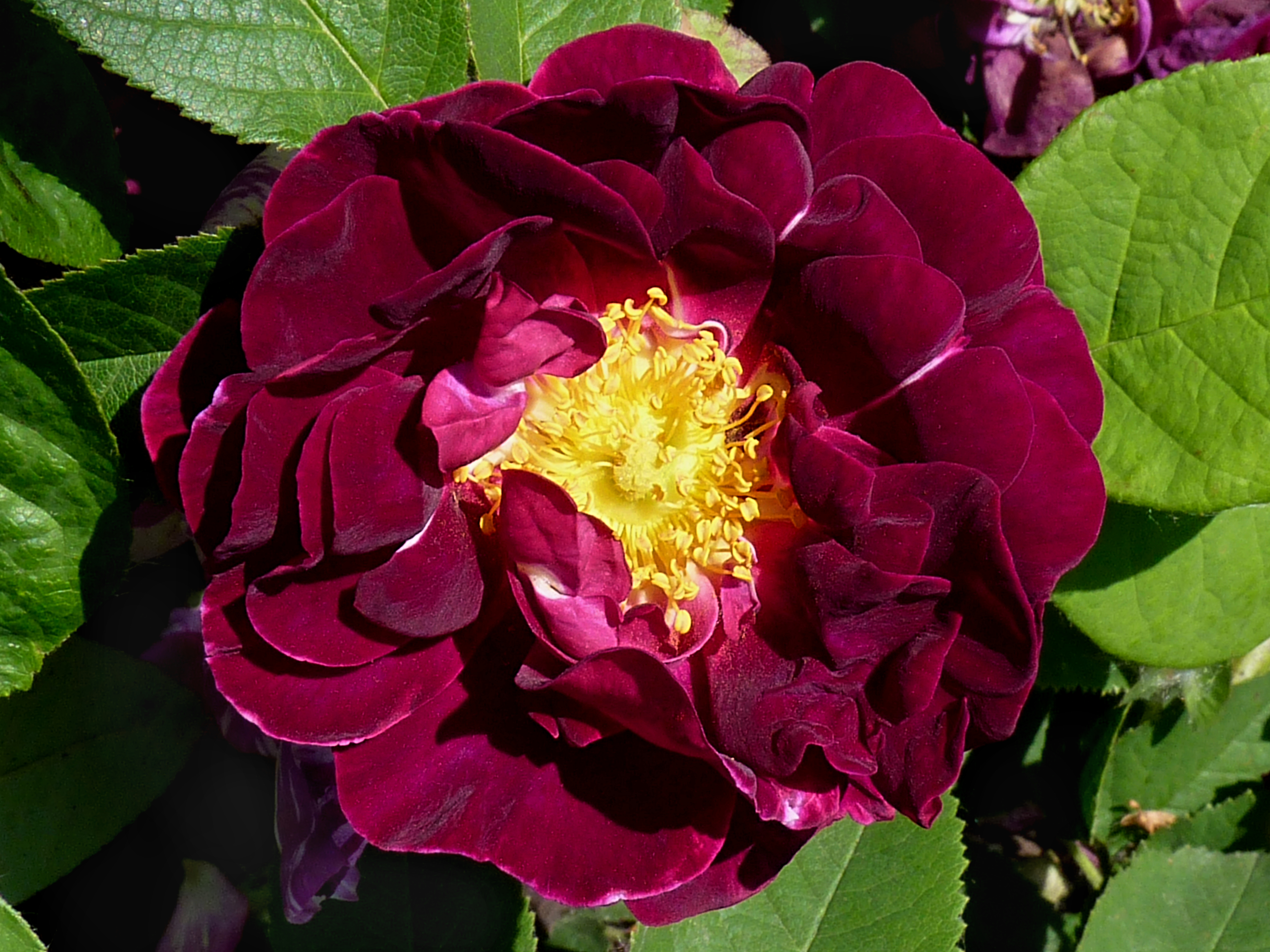
The moss rose 'Nuits de Young' (left) and the gallica rose 'Tuscany' (right) have the "less familiar" colours typical of old roses at Sissinghurst. (Note: Sackville-West wrote of 'Tuscany': "The Velvet Rose. What a combination of words! One almost suffocates in their soft depths, as though one sank into a bed of rose-petals, all thorns ideally stripped away.")

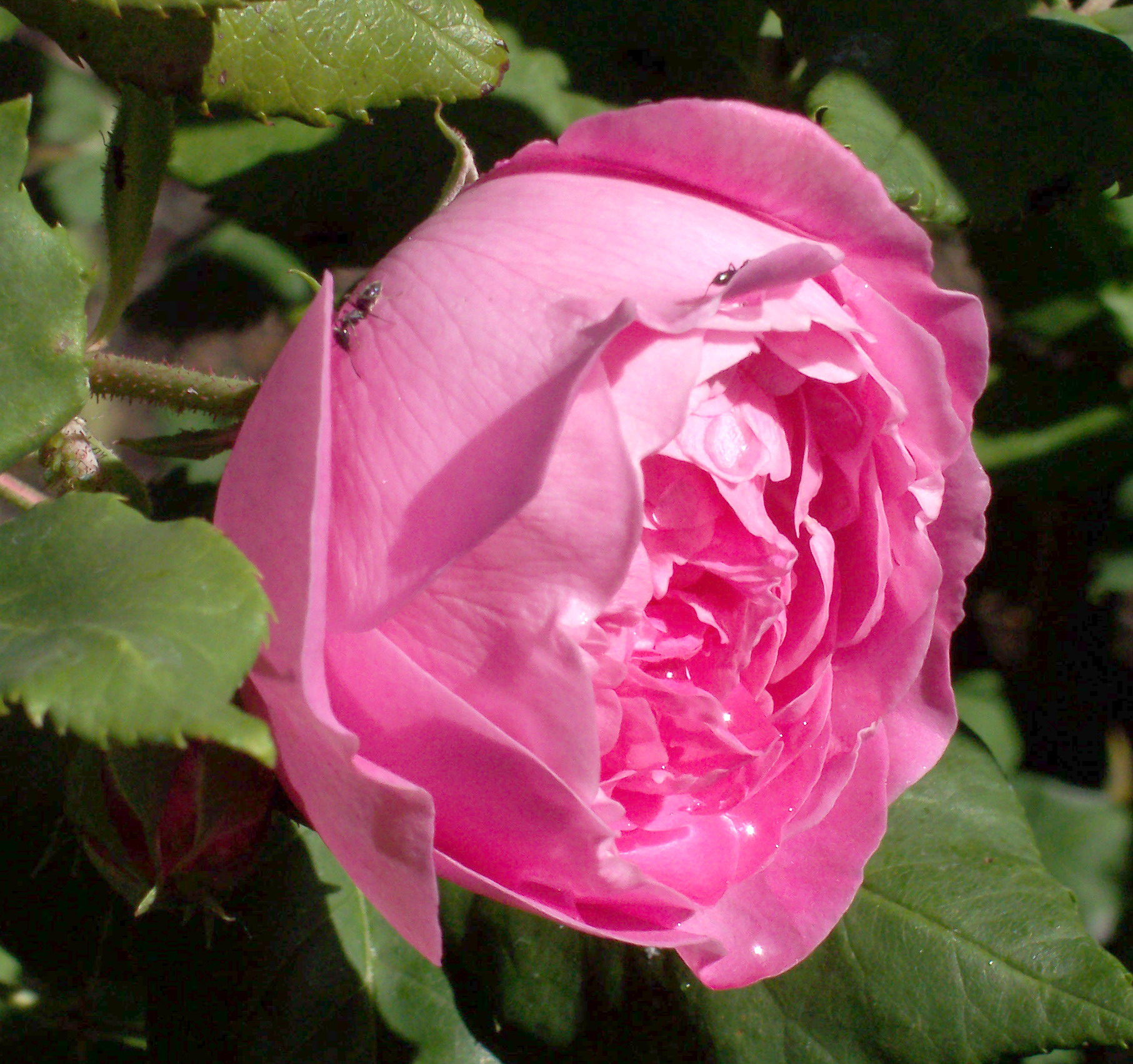
'Madame Pierre Oger' was one of Sackville-West's favourite roses.

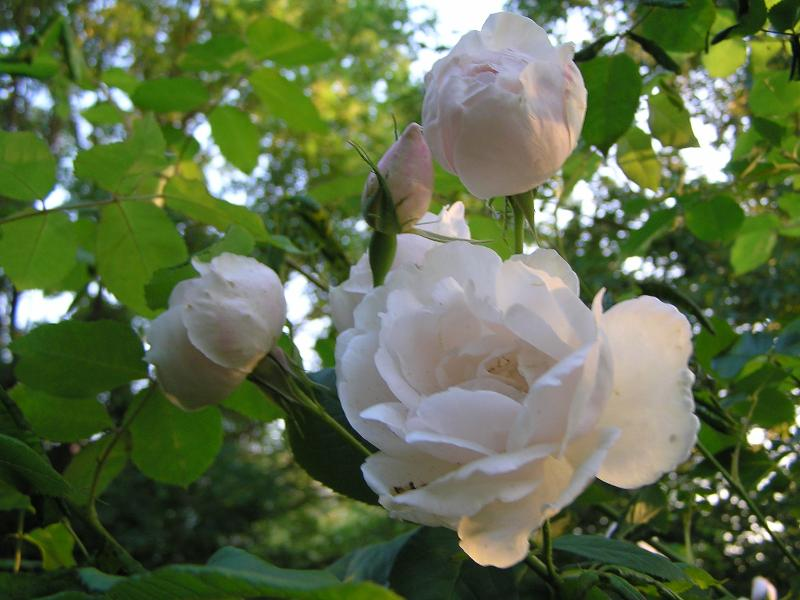
'Madame Alfred Carrière' was the first rose she planted at Sissinghurst.

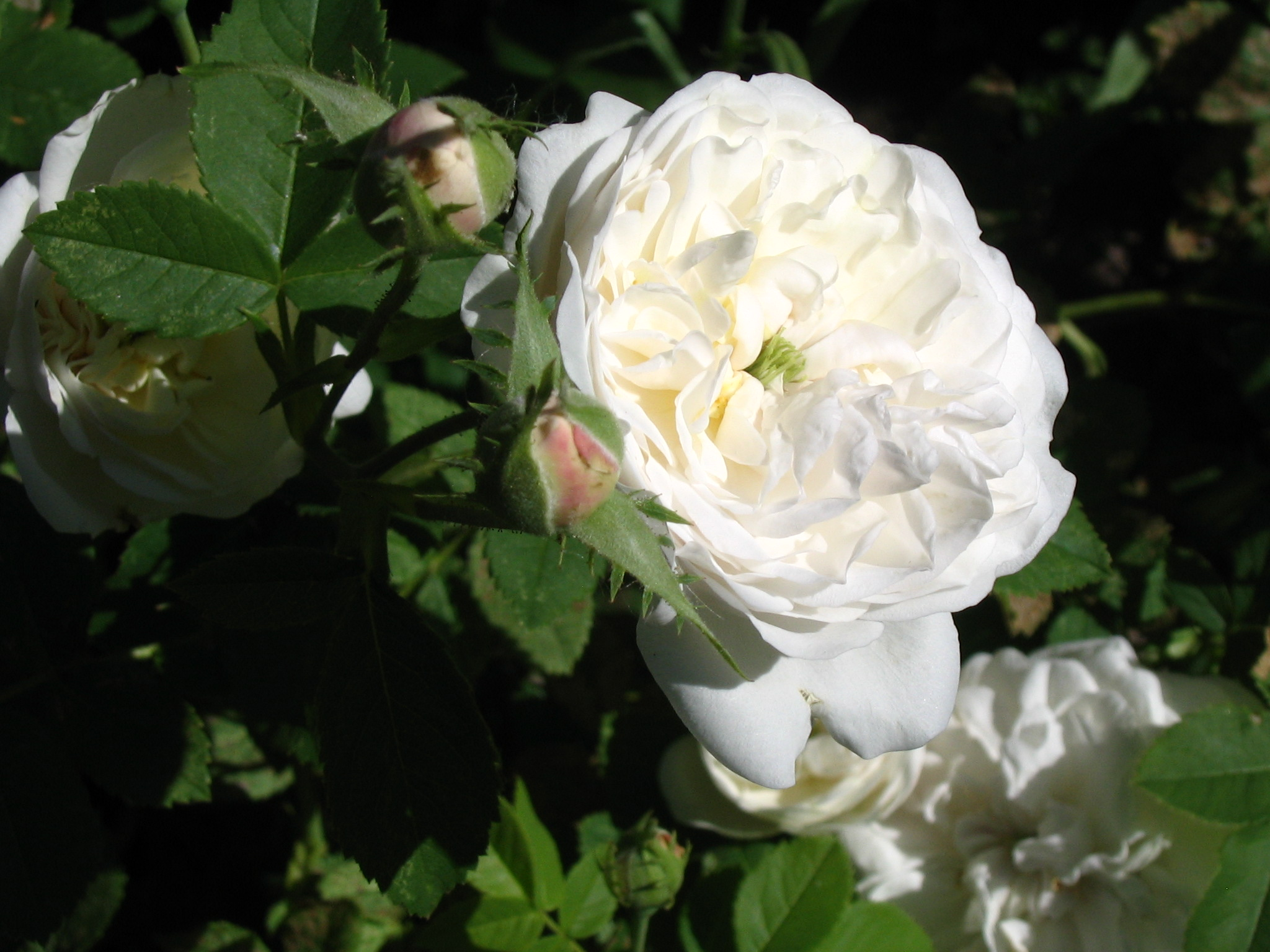
'Madame Plantier' is grown against trees in the Orchard.

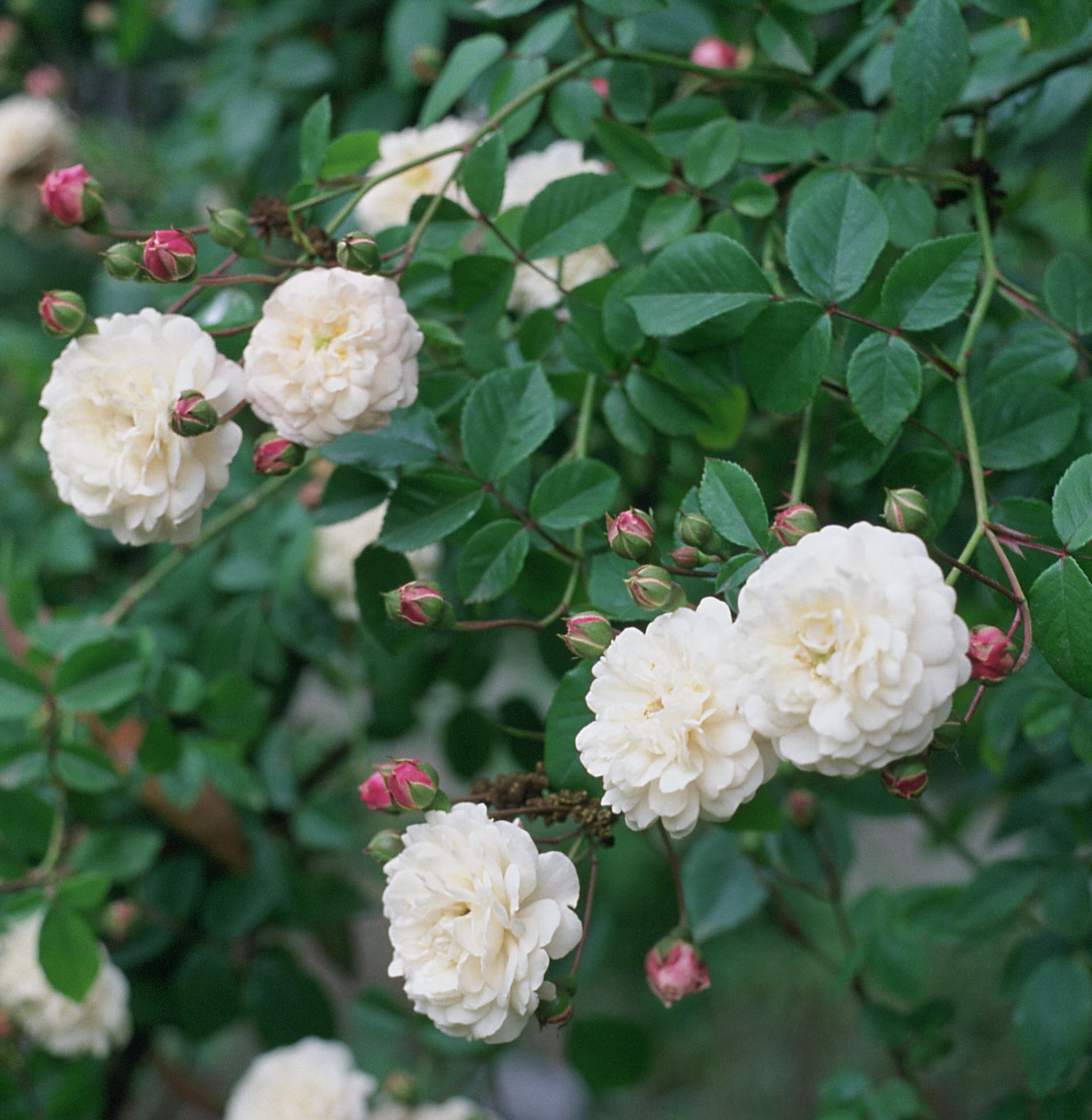
'Félicité et Perpétue' is also grown in the Orchard.

The focus of Sackville-West's collection was, however, on species roses and old garden varieties. Sackville-West described her love of the old roses, saying that one should "discard the idea that roses must be limited to certain accepted and accustomed colours, and to welcome the less familiar purples and lilacs, and the striped, flaked, mottled variations which recall the old Dutch flower-paintings; to approach them, in fact, with open and unprejudiced eyes, and also with a nose that esteems the true scent of a rose warmed by the sun." She was especially fond of the bourbon roses 'Madame Isaac Péreire' (named after one of the two wives of Isaac Pereire) and 'Madame Pierre Oger'. (Note: In one of her gardening columns, Sackville-West gave readers advice on maintenance; "the Bourbon roses should not be heavily pruned. Dead and twiggy wood should be cut out. How easy to say and how scratchy to do".) Graham Stuart Thomas, who helped locate rose varieties for Sissinghurst and advised Sackville-West on the design of the Rose Garden, described 'Madame Isaac Péreire' as "[p]ossibly the most powerfully fragrant of all roses", and 'Madame Pierre Oger' as having a "formal perfection unique among roses".

When she first visited the property, Sackville-West came upon a dark red, double-flowered form of Rosa gallica growing wild and apparently dating from earlier plantings there. She eventually planted it in the Orchard, and it is now known as the cultivar 'Sissinghurst Castle'. In 1930, even before the deeds to the property had been signed, she planted the noisette rose 'Madame Alfred Carrière' on the south face of the South Cottage, making it the first rose she would plant in the gardens.

In the Rose Garden itself, many roses were planted singly, but two deep pink varieties, the bourbon 'Madame Lauriol de Barny' and the damask 'La Ville de Bruxelles', were planted closely in groups of three and allowed to grow together, providing focal points on the left and right sides, respectively, of the garden.

In the White Garden, Rosa mulliganii is trained over an arbour to provide the centrepiece of the design. Several varieties are trained to climb up trees in the Orchard. These include 'Albéric Barbier', described by Thomas as "a great favourite" among the hybrids of Rosa wichuraiana. Another is 'Félicité et Perpétue', a Rosa sempervirens hybrid that was named for the two daughters of the gardener to the Duke of Orléans in 1827, who were, in turn, named after Perpetua and Felicity. A third is the noisette 'Madame Plantier', of which Sackville-West wrote: "I go out and look at her in the moonlight: she gleams, a pear-shaped ghost, contriving to look both matronly and virginal."

=== Trees and hedges ===
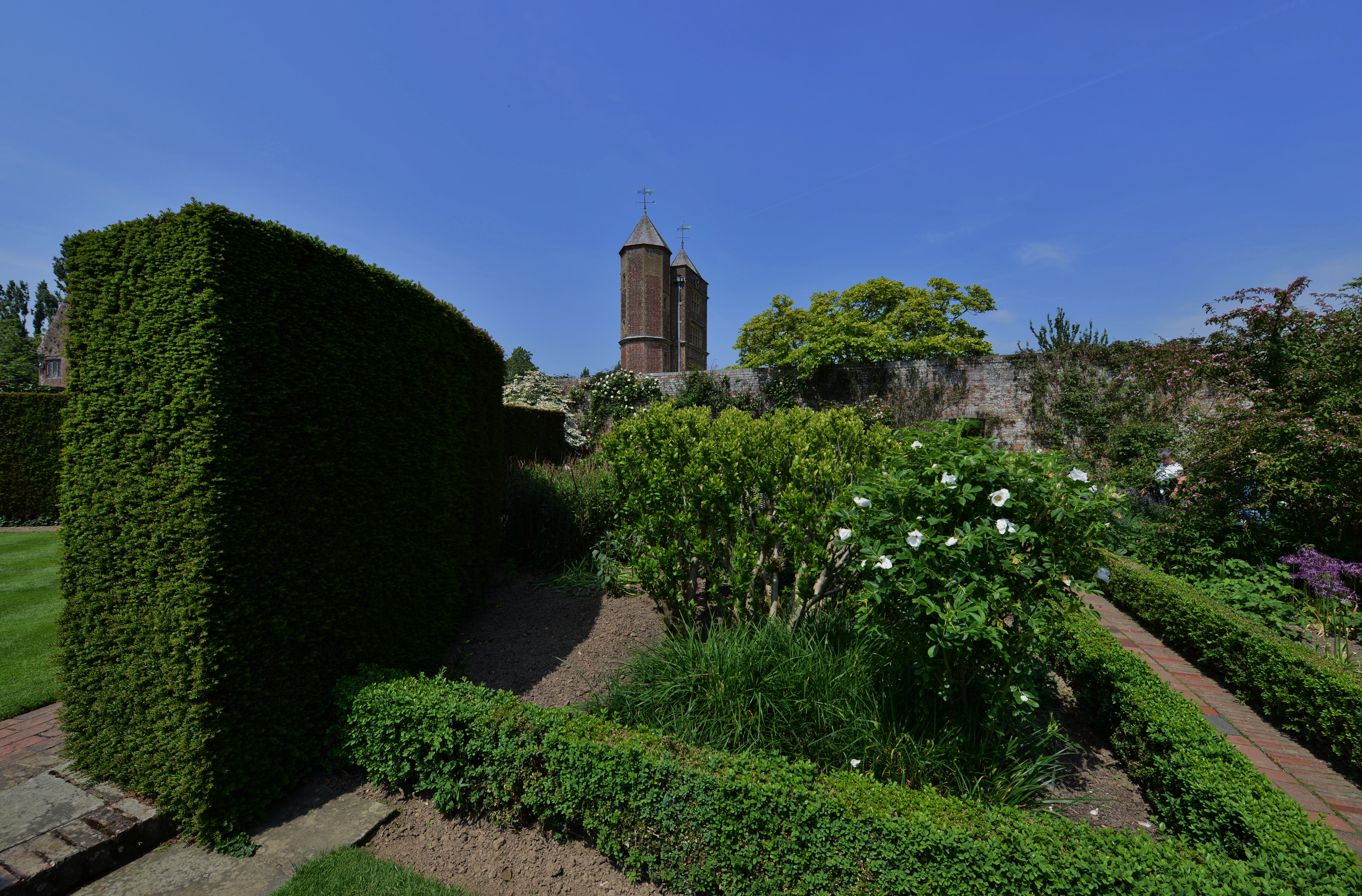
Formal hedges feature prominently in the gardens.

For the most part, Sackville-West and Nicolson simply kept the large trees that were already growing on the property, to serve as the major specimens. These included numerous ancient oaks that frame many of the individual gardens. The Orchard was made up of apple and pear trees that had been planted long before; Sackville-West and Nicolson decided to keep them and use them as supports for climbing roses. Similarly, the Nuttery consisted entirely of filberts that appear to have been planted around 1900.

Some trees were added to the plantings, notably the limes of the Lime Walk. A bed of Magnolia liliiflora 'Nigra' is at the southern end of the Lower Courtyard, and some Magnolia grandiflora are on the walls of the Top Courtyard. A coral tree is in the Lower Courtyard. Some Malus and Prunus previously in the Rose Garden died out, as have Robinia pseudoacacia, Cercidiphyllum japonicum, and Koelreuteria paniculata in the Cottage Garden. A catalpa was planted as a focal point of the Lower Courtyard lawn in 1932, and Nicolson liked to sit beneath it and read, but it died in the 1960s.

Hedges play a critical role in defining the "garden rooms". Yews, hornbeams, and box are each used in this way, clipped into formal square-edged rows of various heights. Yews are also pruned into vertical accents that mimic the shape of Italian cypress.

=== Named cultivars ===
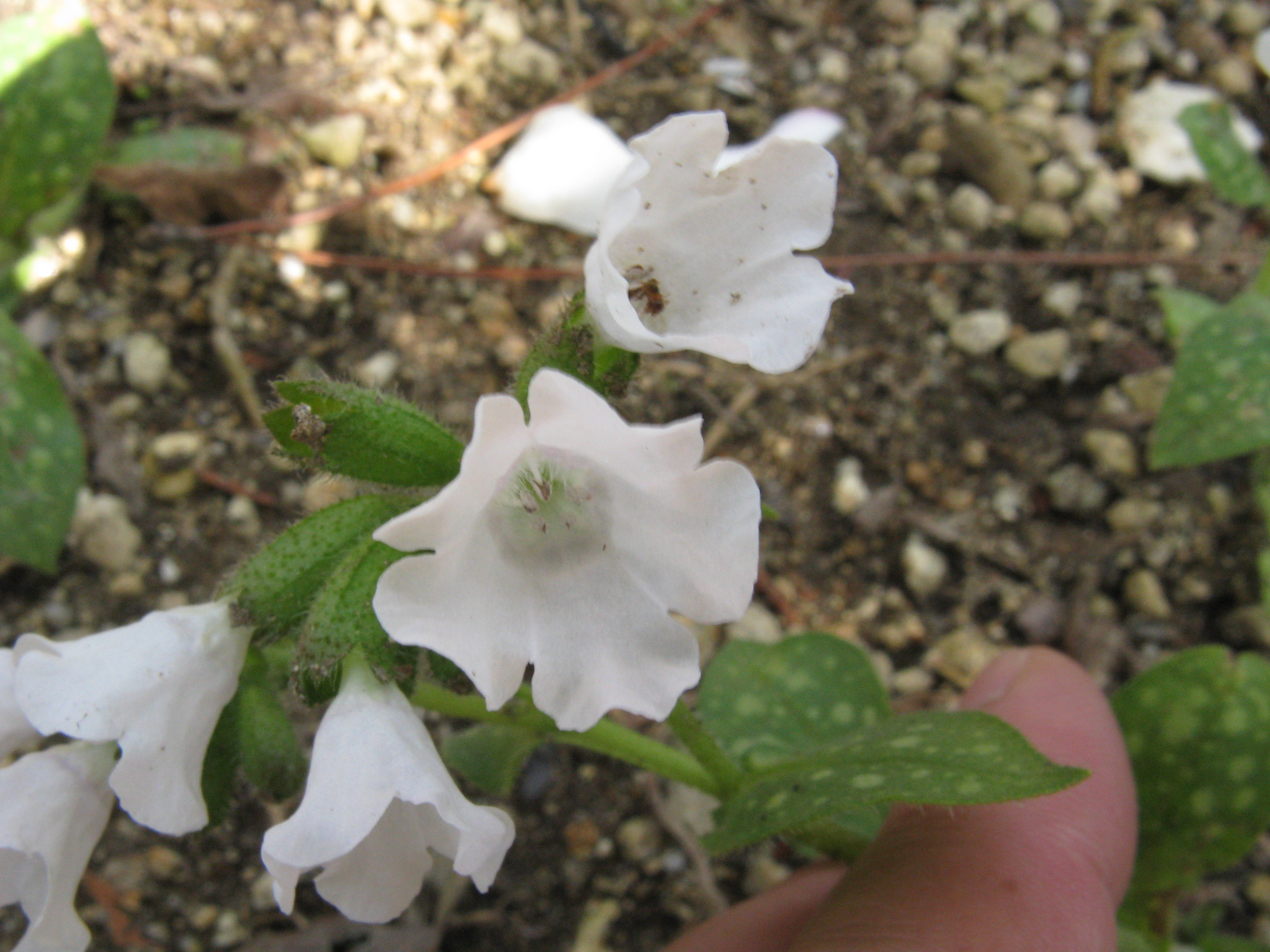
Pulmonaria 'Sissinghurst White'

In addition to the 'Sissinghurst Castle' rose, multiple other flowering plants have been grown at Sissinghurst and given names honouring the property or the people associated with it. Sackville-West herself had low enthusiasm for naming plants in this way, and she and Nicolson actually dug up and discarded a rose that was named 'Lady Sackville' after her mother. There are numerous plants that have been given trade names based on the gardens, including Tanacetum parthenium 'Rowallane' which has often been mislabelled as 'Sissinghurst', but there are several that are grown at or were discovered at Sissinghurst and were named to reflect the association.

Sackville-West made an exception to her dislike of naming plants in memory of people and purchased Viola 'Lady Sackville' late in her life, around 1960, planting it in the Delos. A few years after her death, a seedling appeared that seems to have been a spontaneous cross between 'Lady Sackville' and the variety 'Nellie Britton' that was growing alongside it. It had flowers of a rich pink that were larger than those of the parent varieties. The gardeners named it 'Vita'. Sackville-West had also grown a variety of rosemary (Rosmarinus officinalis) that self-seeded in the Tower steps, and differed from the common variety in having upright rather than trailing stems, and flowers of a deeper shade of blue. It has come to be recognized as a distinct cultivar, and named 'Sissinghurst Blue'.

She walks among the loveliness she made,
Between the apple-blossom and the water –
She walks among the patterned pied brocade,
Each flower her son and every tree her daughter.

— Extract from Sackville-West's poem The Land, printed on the service sheet for her funeral

In 1969, a gardener in Kent bred a cultivar of dwarf bearded iris with reddish-purple flowers. He gave a specimen to Sissinghurst, where it was planted in the Purple Border, and named Iris 'Sissinghurst'. During the 1970s, a pink-flowered specimen of Glandularia (Verbena) was given to the garden and named 'Sissinghurst'. In 1976, the garden was given a distinctive specimen of Pulmonaria officinalis that, unlike the species, has large white flowers (along with the white-spotted leaves of the species). It was planted in the White Garden and named 'Sissinghurst White'. Around 1977, the gardeners purchased a collection of seedlings of Thalictrum aquilegiifolium. They selected the best plant, having larger flowers, and propagated it. This plant was added to the White Garden and named 'White Cloud'. From a planting of Penstemon 'Evelyn', which is a selection of Penstemon barbatus, a specimen was named 'Sissinghurst Pink', although Lord does not consider it to be distinct from 'Evelyn'.

In the late 1980s, Pamela Schwerdt and Sibylle Kreutzberger found a specimen of Phlox stolonifera with a remarkably rich purple colour in a florist's shop near the Chelsea Flower Show. They planted it in the Top Courtyard and named it 'Violet Vere' after Schwerdt's mother, who had been President of the Wild Flower Society and was celebrating her ninetieth birthday.

== See also ==
- History of gardening (with a list of notable historical gardens)

== Sources ==
- Armitage, Allan M. (1989). Herbaceous Perennial Plants: A Treatise on their Identification, Culture, and Garden Attributes (2nd ed.). Champaign, IL: Stipes Publishing. ISBN 978-0-87563-810-2.
- Brown, Jane (1982). Gardens Of A Golden Afternoon. London: Penguin Books. ISBN 978-06708-0640-9.
- — (1985). Vita's Other World – A Gardening Biography of V. Sackville-West. Harmondsworth, UK and New York: Viking Press. ISBN 978-06708-0163-3.
- — (1998). Sissinghurst – Portrait of a Garden. London: Orion Books. ISBN 978-07538-0437-7.
- Channon, Henry (1967). Rhodes James, Robert (ed.). Chips: The Diaries of Sir Henry Channon. London: Weidenfeld & Nicolson. ISBN 978-1-85799-493-3.
- Clayton, Phil (2013). Sissinghurst Castle Garden (PDF). London: Royal Horticultural Society.
- Davey, Peter (1995). Arts and Crafts Architecture. London: Phaidon Press. ISBN 978-07148-2874-9.
- Dennison, Matthew (2015). Behind the Mask: The Life of Vita Sackville-West. New York: St. Martin's Press. ISBN 978-1-250-03394-9.
- Erler, Catriona Tudor (1999). Garden Rooms: Create and Decorate Outdoor Garden Spaces. Alexandria, Virginia: Time-Life Books. ISBN 978-0-737-00601-8. OCLC 40408855.
- Fleming, Laurence; Gore, Alan (1988). The English Garden. London: Spring Books. ISBN 978-06005-5728-9.
- Girouard, Mark (2009). Elizabethan Architecture: Its Rise and Fall, 1540–1640. New Haven, CT and London: Yale University Press. ISBN 978-03000-9386-5.
- Glendinning, Victoria (2005). Vita – The Life of V. Sackville-West. London: Orion Books. ISBN 978-0-7538-1926-5.
- Gothien, Marie-Luise (2014). A History of Garden Art. Cambridge: Cambridge University Press. ISBN 978-11080-7614-2.
- Greeves, Lydia (2008). Houses of the National Trust. London: National Trust Books. ISBN 978-19054-0066-9.
- Horwood, Catherine (2010). Gardening Women: Their Stories From 1600 to the Present. London: Hachette. ISBN 978-0-748-11833-5.
- Howard, Maurice (1987). The Early Tudor Country House: Architecture and Politics 1490–1550. London: George Philip. ISBN 978-0-540-01119-3.
- Hoyles, Martin (1994). Gardeners Delight: Gardening Books from 1560 to 1960. Boulder, Colorado and London: Pluto Press. ISBN 978-0-7453-0804-3.
- Hussey, Christopher (1989) [1950]. The Life of Sir Edwin Lutyens. Woodbridge: Antique Collectors Club. ISBN 978-0-907462-59-0.
- Jenkins, Simon (2003). England's Thousand Best Houses. London: Penguin Books. ISBN 978-07139-9596-1.
- Kerr Forsyth, Holly (2007). The Constant Gardener. London: The Miegunyah Press. ISBN 978-0-5228-5432-9.
- Lees-Milne, James (1980). Harold Nicolson: A Biography 1886–1929. Vol. 1. London: Chatto & Windus. ISBN 978-07011-2520-2.
- — (1981). Harold Nicolson: A Biography 1930–1968. Vol. 2. London: Chatto & Windus. ISBN 978-07011-2602-5.
- — (1994). A Mingled Measure: Diaries, 1953–1972. London: John Murray. ISBN 978-07195-5362-2.
- — (1997). Ancient As The Hills: Diaries, 1973–1974. London: John Murray. ISBN 978-07195-5596-1.
- Lord, Tony (1995). Gardening at Sissinghurst. London: Frances Lincoln. ISBN 978-07112-0991-6.
- MacMillan, Margaret (2001). Peacemakers: The Paris Conference of 1919 and its Attempt to End War. London: John Murray. ISBN 978-07195-6233-4.
- Nevins, Deborah (1984). The garden at Sissinghurst Castle, Kent (PDF). Kent: Kent Magazine.
- Newman, John (2012). Kent: West and The Weald. The Buildings of England. New Haven and London: Yale University Press. ISBN 978-03001-8509-6.
- Nicolson, Adam (2008). Sissinghurst – An Unfinished History. London: Harper Press. ISBN 978-00072-4054-8.
- — (2008b). Sissinghurst. London: National Trust. ISBN 978-18435-9300-3.
- Nicolson, Harold (1966). Nigel Nicolson (ed.). Diaries and Letters: 1930–1939. London: William Collins, Sons. OCLC 874514916.
- — (1967). Nigel Nicolson (ed.). Diaries and Letters: 1939–1945. London: William Collins, Sons. OCLC 264742347.
- — (1968). Nigel Nicolson (ed.). Diaries and Letters: 1945–1962. London: William Collins, Sons. OCLC 264742357.
- Nicolson, Nigel (1964). Sissinghurst Castle – An illustrated history. London: National Trust. OCLC 39835087.
- — (1990). Portrait of a Marriage. London: Guild Publishing. OCLC 50979846.
- — (1992). Vita & Harold – The Letters of Vita Sackville-West and Harold Nicolson 1910–1962. London: Orion Books. ISBN 978-1-857-99061-4.
- Purcell, Mark (2019) [2017]. The Country House Library. New Haven, US and London: Yale University Press. ISBN 978-0-300-24868-5.
- Raven, Sarah (2014). Sissinghurst – Vita Sackville-West and the Creation of a Garden. London: Virago Press. ISBN 978-18440-8896-6.
- Rose, Norman (2006). Harold Nicolson. London: Pimlico. ISBN 978-07126-6845-3.
- Sackville-West, Robert (2010). Inheritance: The Story of Knole and the Sackvilles. London: Bloomsbury Publishing. ISBN 978-14088-1133-7.
- Sackville-West, Vita (1991). Knole And The Sackvilles. London: The National Trust. OCLC 91730091.
- Scott-James, Ann (1974). Sissinghurst – The Making of a Garden. London: Michael Joseph. ISBN 978-07181-2256-0.
- Taylor, Alan (1972). Beaverbrook. London: Hamish Hamilton. ISBN 978-02410-2170-5.
- Thomas, Graham Stuart (1971) [First published 1955]. The Old Shrub Roses. London: J.M. Dent & Sons. OCLC 9800187.
- Tinniswood, Adrian (2016). The Long Weekend: Life in the English Country House Between the Wars. London: Jonathan Cape. ISBN 978-02240-9945-5.
