= The Hollister Homestead =

Historic house in Connecticut, United States

- U.S. National Register of Historic Places
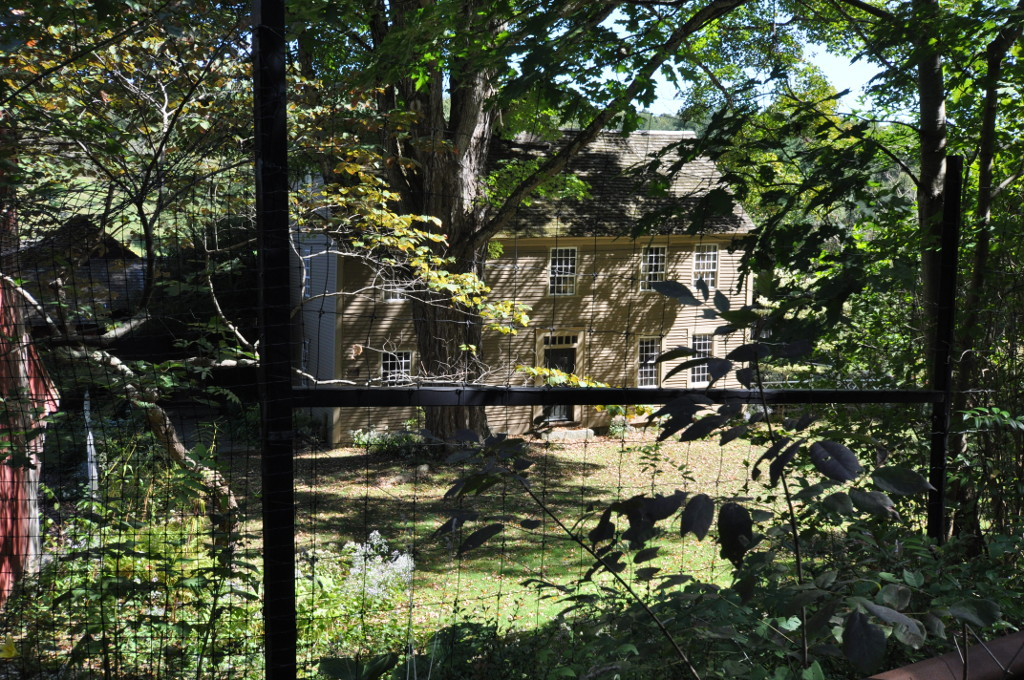

- Location within Connecticut Location within the United States
- Location: 300 Nettleton Hollow Road, Washington, Connecticut
- Area: 22.2 acres (9.0 ha)
- Built: 1770
- Built by: Hollister, Capt. Gideon
- Architectural style: Colonial
- NRHP reference No.: 10000350
- Added to NRHP: June 15, 2010

The Hollister Homestead is a historic house at 300 Nettleton Hollow Road in Washington, Connecticut. Built about 1770, it is a prominent local example of Georgian architecture. The property is also the site of the Hollister House Garden, an English garden begun in 1979 and open to the public. The property was listed on the National Register of Historic Places in 2010. The gardens are open between May and October.

== Description ==
The Hollister Homestead is located in southeastern Washington, a rural community in northwestern Connecticut. It is set on the east side of Nettleton Hollow Road, north of its junction with West Mountain Road. The developed portion of the 22-acre (8.9 ha) property is located between the road and Sprain Brook, which the road parallels. The c. 1770 Gideon Hollister House is the centerpiece of the building complex of the property, which also includes barns and outbuildings dating to the 18th and 19th centuries. Hollister was a prominent local citizen, who operated a sawmill nearby; his family owned the property into the 20th century.

The gardens extend eastward from the house toward the brook, and are divided into a series of "rooms" by hedges and use of the terrain. The garden began in 1979 as the work of George Schoellkopf, with later contributions to its design by Gerald Incandela. The main influence is Sissinghurst Castle Garden in Kent, England, which Schoellkopf visited in the 1970s. The property is undergoing ownership change from Schoellkopf to a non-profit organization dedicated to the preservation and maintenance of the garden.

== See also ==
- National Register of Historic Places listings in Litchfield County, Connecticut
