= Tony Lord =

British photographer and gardener

Tony Lord is a United Kingdom gardener, photographer and author. In 2005 the Royal Horticultural Society awarded him the Victoria Medal of Honour (V.M.H) for his work as a garden photographer, horticultural consultant and writer.

Lord started out as a social anthropologist. In Micronesia, he studied the connections between nature and indigenous peoples, and became very interested in plants and their interactions.

Lord received his gardening training at Kew Gardens, holds a doctorate in horticulture, and later was the Gardens Adviser for the British National Trust. For over ten years he has edited the Royal Horticultural Society annual publication Plant Finder, and he is a regular contributor to the magazine The Garden.

Lord's first book, Best Borders, won the Garden Writers' Guild award for the best general gardening book of 1994. His book Gardening at Sissinghurst took a new and deeper approach to garden analysis and has been translated into German, French and Dutch.
