= Hidcote =

Hidcote may refer to:

- Hidcote Bartrim, a village in Gloucestershire
  - Hidcote Manor Garden, a garden owned by the National Trust
- Lavandula angustifolia 'Hidcote', a cultivar of lavender

== See also ==
- for Hidcote comfrey see Symphytum grandiflorum
