= Norah Lindsay =

Socialite and Garden Designer (1873–1948)

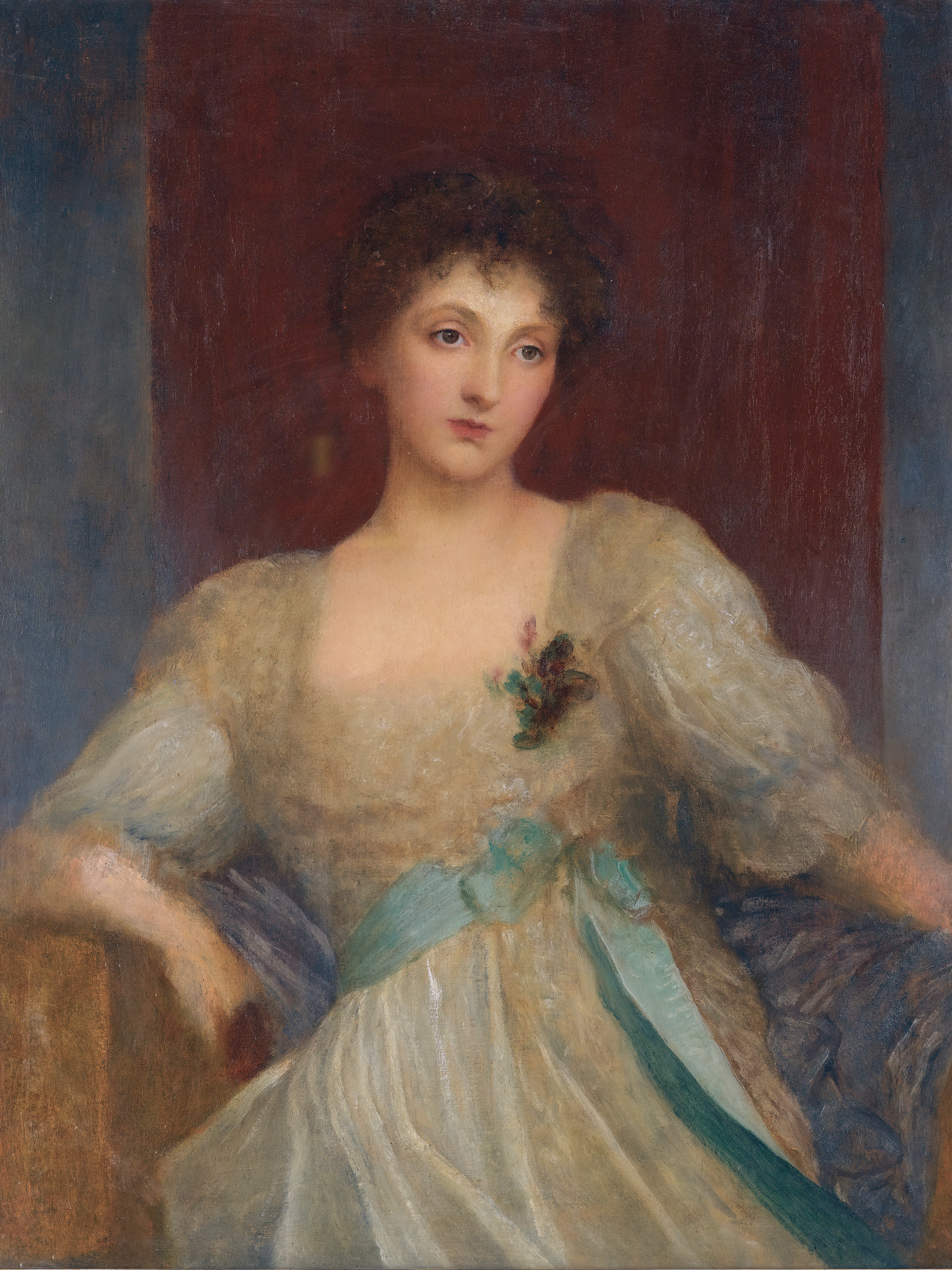
Norah Lindsay by George Frederic Watts, ca 1891

Norah Mary Madeleine Lindsay (née Bourke) (26 April 1873 – 20 June 1948) was a British garden designer who between the World wars became a major influence on garden design and planting in the United Kingdom and on the Continent.

== Biography ==
Norah Mary Madeline Bourke was born at the hill station of Ootacamund, India into an Anglo-Irish upper class military family, the niece of the 6th Earl of Mayo, the Governor-General and Viceroy of India. At the age of 22 she married the brother of Violet Lindsay Manners, Sir Harry Lindsay and went to live at her wedding gift, Sutton Courtenay Manor, Oxfordshire, actually an assemblage of charming and picturesque houses and cottages, fine barns and stables, where she developed her skills as a gardener. Influenced by Gertrude Jekyll she created the noted garden at the house, with an inspired kind of untidiness that influenced her lifelong friend Vita Sackville-West's love of self-seeded surprise effects within a formal structure at Sissinghurst and that may be detected today in the garden style of Rosemary Verey. The writings of Gertrude Jekyll and the early champion of wild gardens William Robinson, she had no formal botanical training, but a highly developed 'garden sense' that was in part the inheritance of her class. In 1924 after the collapse of her marriage and facing financial ruin she embarked on a career as a garden designer. Lindsay spent her entire life socialising with the upper echelons of society. This led to many commissions from a client base which included royalty, English nobility and American expatriates.

Nancy Lancaster, the founder of the firm carried on by Sibyl Colefax and John Fowler, employed her at Ditchley Park and Kelmarsh Hall, and at the dozens of other country-house gardens she worked on, from Port Lympne, Kent, to Chirk Castle in North Wales. Lindsay collaborated with Christopher Hussey in two Country Life articles that illustrated Sutton Courtenay in its final, mature phase.

Nancy Lindsay (1896–1973) was the only daughter of Norah and Harry Lindsay and was greatly influenced by her mother's love of gardening. She formed a bond with her mother's good friend Maj. Lawrence 'Johnny' Johnston, the creator of Hidcote, that was based upon their common interest in plant collecting. After his death in 1958 Johnston left his French garden Serre de la Madone to Lindsay. She left a selection of her writings, paintings and plants to Oxford University. A small commemorative fund was established after her death to enable women to accompany plant-hunting expeditions led from the University. The legacy from her career is the many plants which bear her name which includes Dianthus Nancy Lindsay.

== Gardens ==
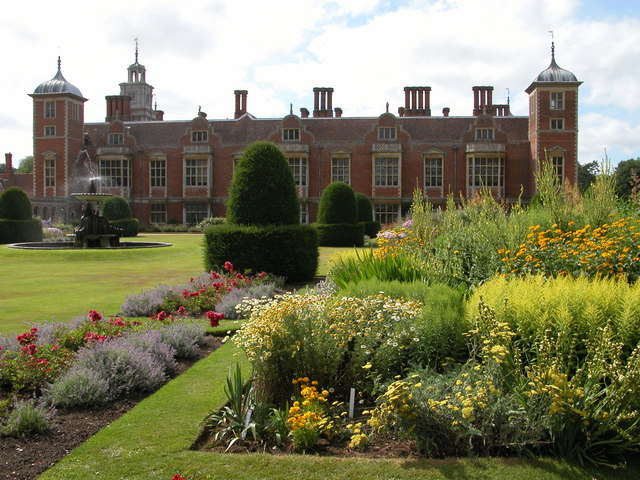
The parterre at Blickling, remade in 1932 by Norah Lindsay planted with hardy perennials

Listed below are a sample of gardens Lindsay influenced, advised, consulted and worked on

National Trust gardens;

- Blickling Hall
- Chirk Castle
- Cliveden
- Hidcote Manor
- Mottisfont Abbey

Commercial and private gardens in the UK;

- Cliveden Hotel
- Ditchley Park
- Faringdon Castle
- Fort Belvedere
- Gleneagles Hotel
- Godmersham Park
- Kelmarsh Hall
- Mells Manor
- Port Lympne
- Rhodes House
- Trent Park

Overseas;

- Bled Castle
- Brdo Castle
- Serre de la Madone
- Villa Madama
