= Mickleton, Gloucestershire =

Village in Gloucestershire, England

Coordinates: 52.0924°N 1.7664°W

Mickleton
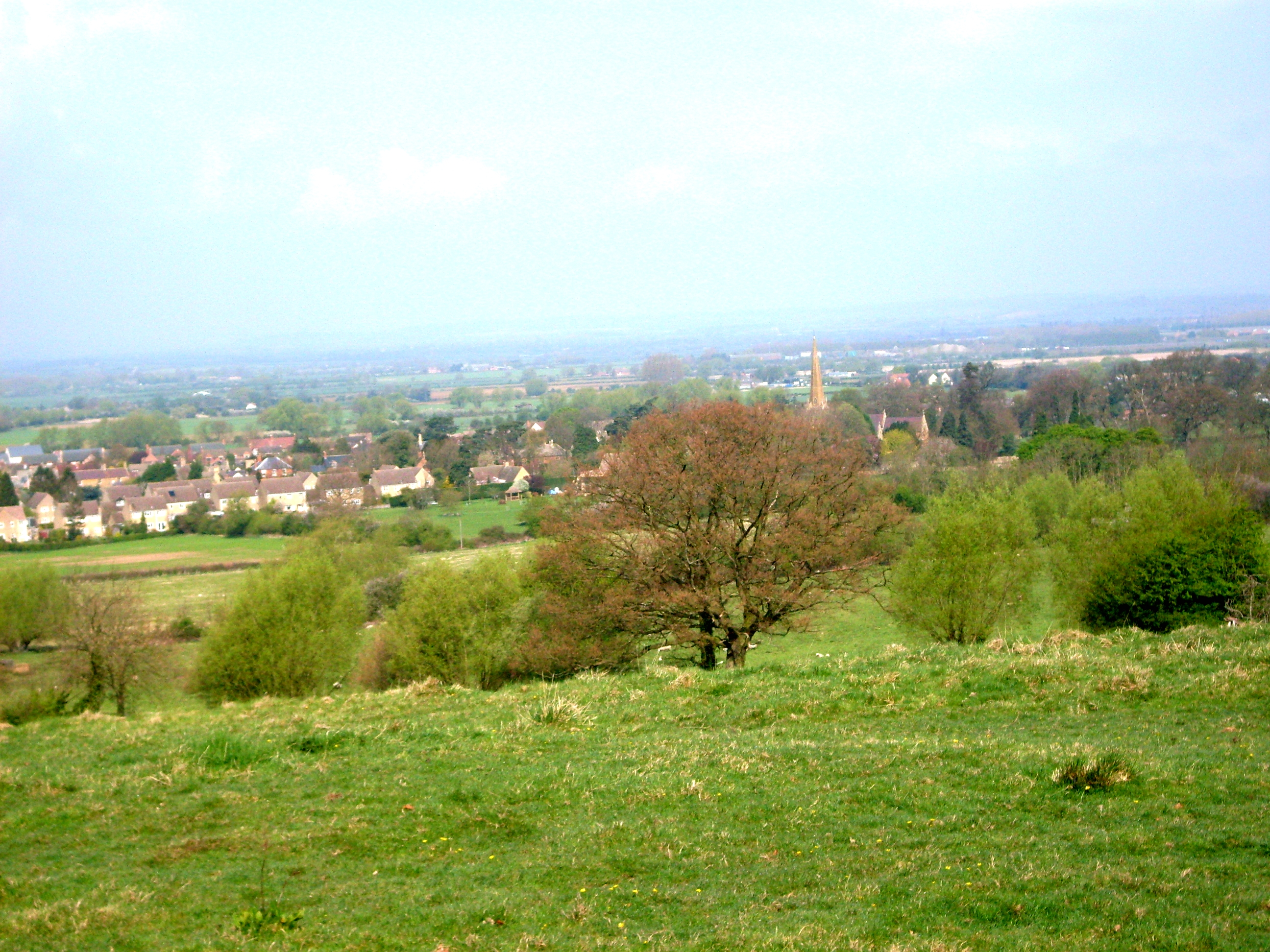
- View over Mickleton

- Location within Gloucestershire
- Population: 1,677 (2011 Census)
- OS grid reference: SP161438
- Civil parish: Mickleton
- District: Cotswold
- Shire county: Gloucestershire
- Region: South West
- Country: England
- Sovereign state: United Kingdom
- Post town: CHIPPING CAMPDEN
- Postcode district: GL55
- Dialling code: 01386, 01789
- Police: Gloucestershire
- Fire: Gloucestershire
- Ambulance: South Western
- UK Parliament: North Cotswolds
- Website: Mickleton Parish Council

Mickleton is a village and civil parish in the Cotswold District of Gloucestershire, England. It is the northernmost settlement in Gloucestershire, lying close to the borders with Worcestershire and Warwickshire, 3 miles (4.8 km) north of Chipping Campden, 8 miles (13 km) east of Evesham and 8 miles (13 km) south of Stratford-upon-Avon. The population of the parish was 1,677 at the 2011 Census.

== Etymology ==
The name Mickleton comes from the Old English micel (big, great) + tūn (settlement).

== Location ==
The village lies at the western edge of the Cotswold escarpment in the Vale of Evesham.

== Attractions ==
Mickleton is noted for its market gardening and vegetable growing. Young plants, seed plugs, apples, cauliflowers and asparagus, or gras, are grown locally. Meon Hill, which lies to the north of the village, is the scene of the so-called 'witchcraft' murder of Charles Walton in 1945 and is said to have inspired Tolkien's 'Weathertop' in The Lord of the Rings. According to legend, Meon Hill was formed by the Devil. He intended to throw a clod of earth at Evesham Abbey but missed, and the earth formed the hill.

Mickleton has two old pubs, King's Arms and Butcher's Arms, the Three Ways House Hotel and several B&Bs. Sited on a green in front of the hotel is a memorial fountain by the Victorian architect William Burges.

The Church of St Lawrence is an Anglican parish church. It contains a memorial to Utrecia Smith, the daughter of a curate of Mickleton whose father was also a schoolmaster. Utrecia had been the fiancée of the writer Richard Graves (who broke off their engagement); she died in 1744 aged 30. King George's Hall, located at the centre of the village, is home to several village clubs and societies.

The Heart of England Way runs through the village. Local market towns and villages include Broadway, Chipping Campden, Stratford-upon-Avon, Moreton-in-Marsh and Evesham.

Both Hidcote Manor Garden and Kiftsgate Court Gardens are located nearby.

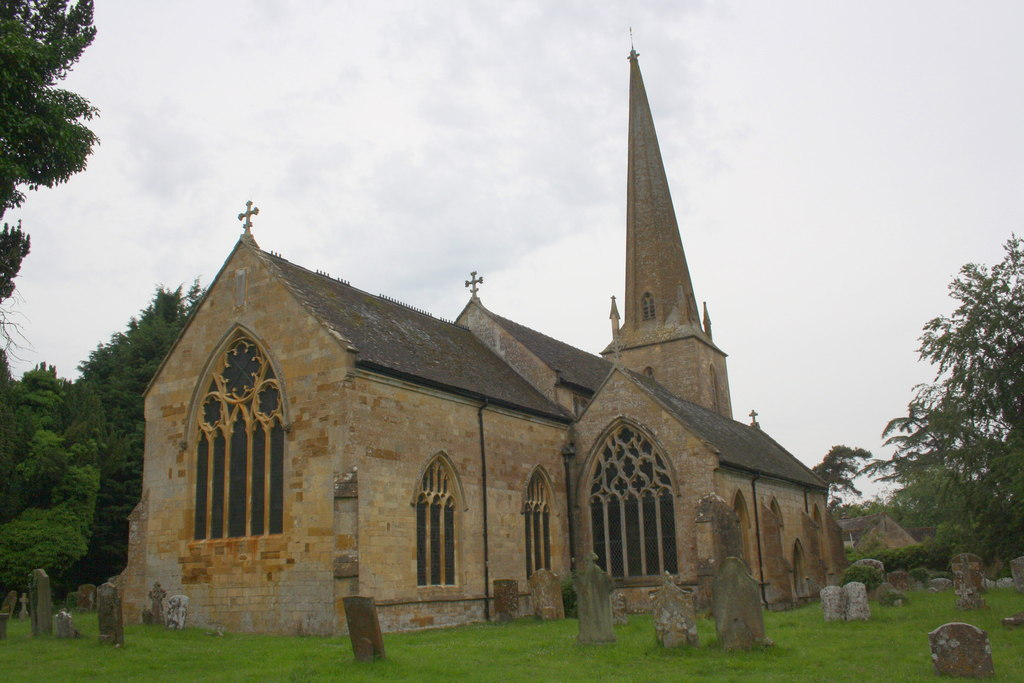
St Lawrence's Church

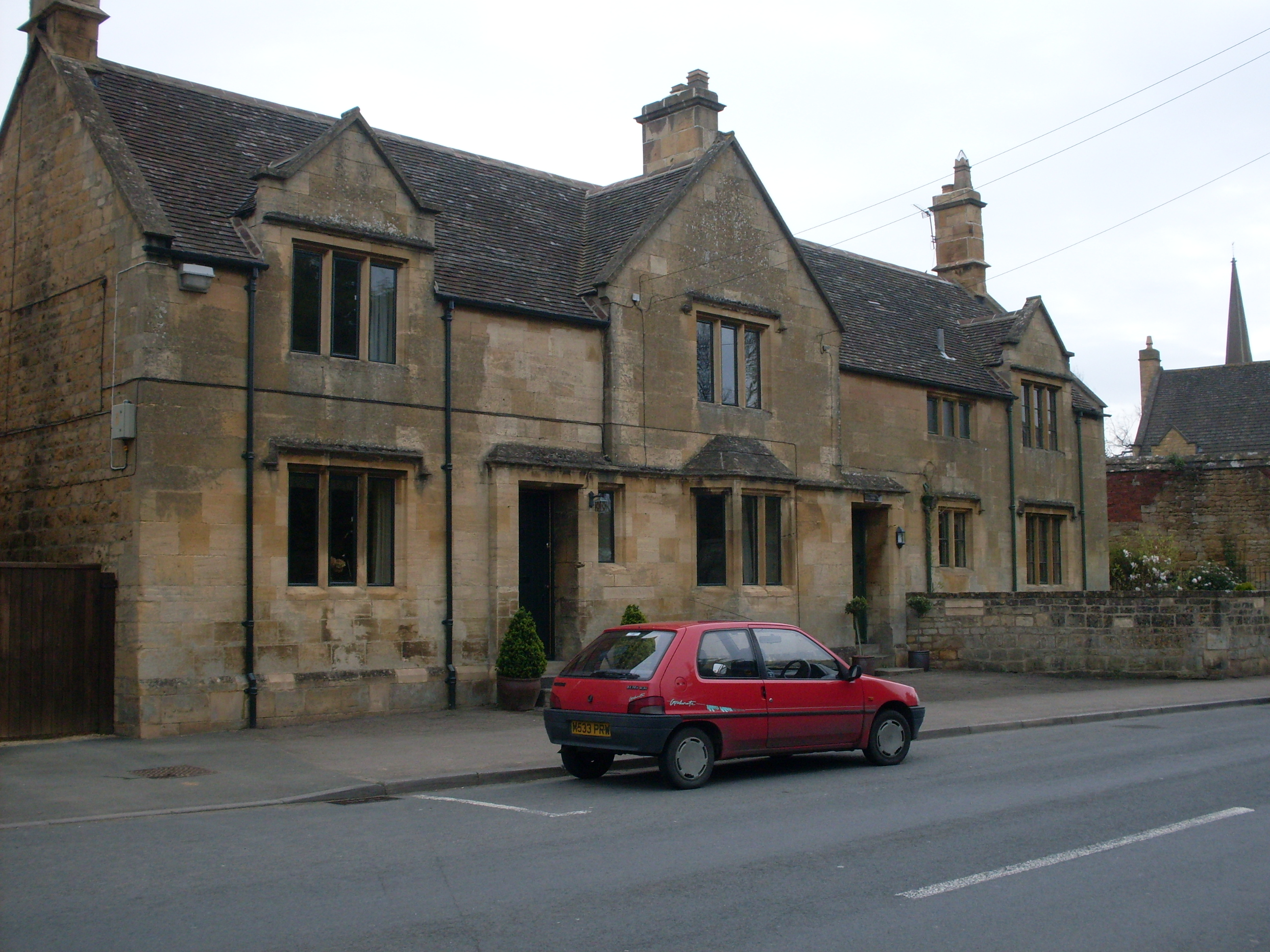
A typical house

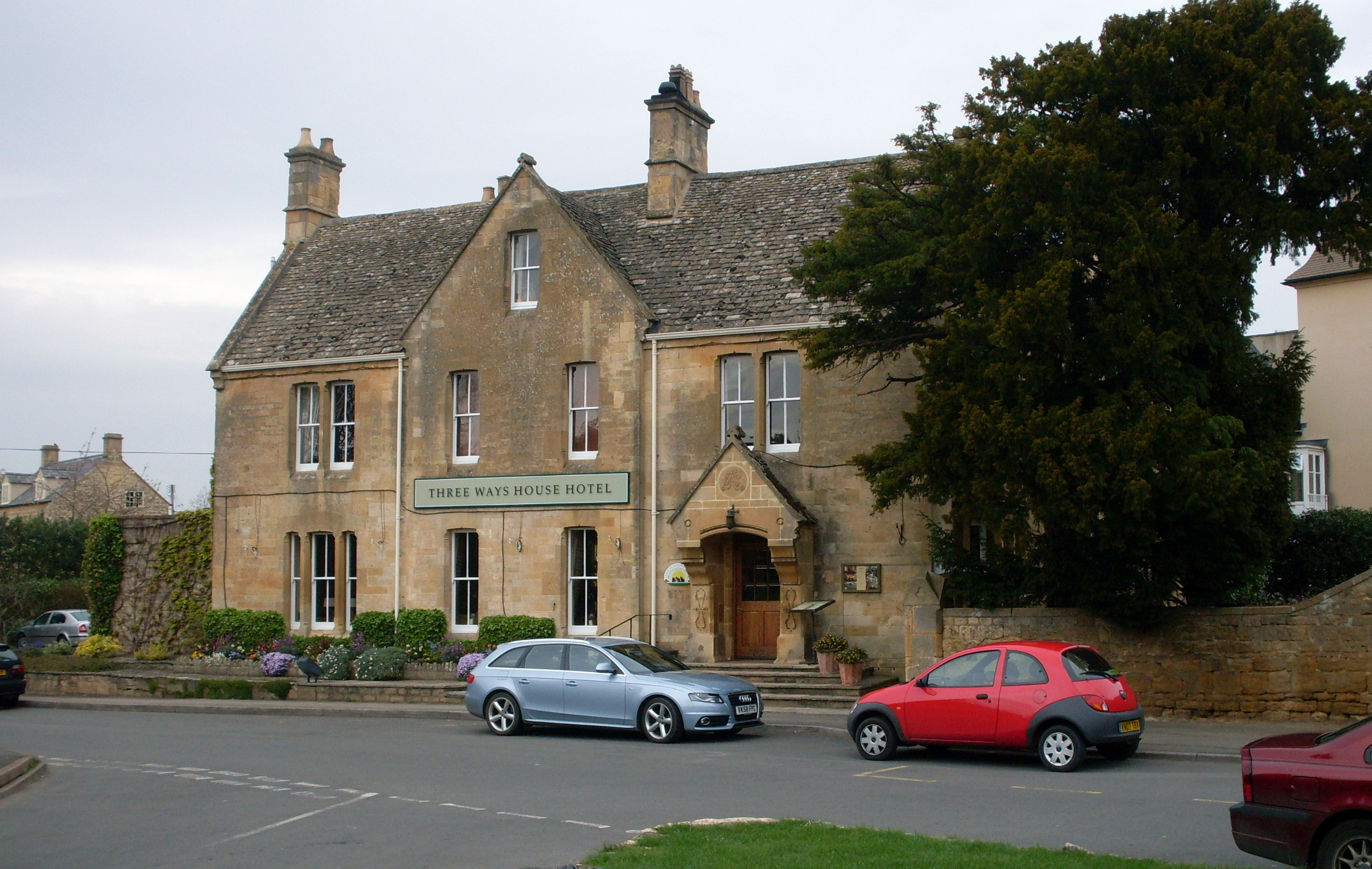
Three Ways House Hotel

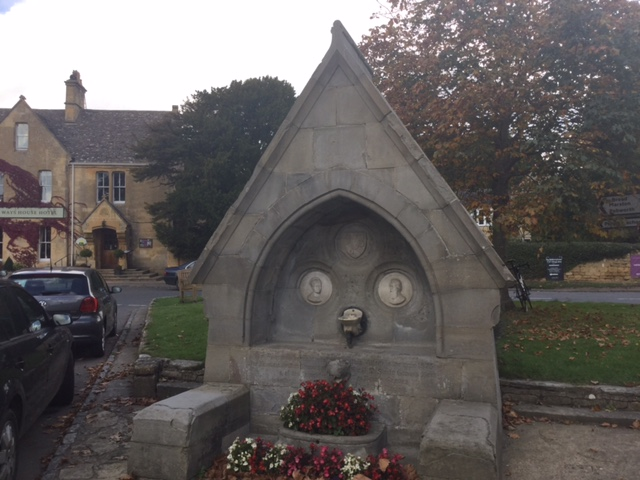
Memorial foundation by William Burges

== Notable residents ==
- Sir Anthony Keck (1630–1695), Commissioner of the Great Seal, was born in Mickleton.
