= Mudford Manor =

Coordinates: 50.9802°N 2.6146°W

Mudford Manor is a historic 17th century Jacobean manor house situated on the Dorset/Somerset border in Mudford, Yeovil. The estate is surrounded by wild meadows with far-reaching views over the River Yeo to the village of Trent in Dorset. The Mudford Manor house is a six-bed freehold detached house situated and is one of two properties situated on the Mudford Manor Estate along with Mudford Manor Barn.

Originally there were three rooms in the main range; a living room, and unheated room and a parlour. One the first floor was bed chambers and one attic room. The north wing is now rebuilt but it was thought that a substantial kitchen with a large fireplace would have been originally located here. The house has large bay windows on the south front which were a fashionable feature of some houses of the time. It features a studded, thick timber front door. In the 18th century other parts of the manor were added such as the west wing and a new kitchen. Some of the original features of the manor have since been lost or replaced such as the main roof and staircase which were damaged in a serious fire in 1975. It has gardens, grounds and a paddock in total extending to 5.6 acres.

== History ==
It was built circa 1630 on the site of a cell used by monks of Montacute Abbey and was developed into a house in 1630 by John Harbin; at one time the Courthouse was in its grounds. In 1102 the Manor was given to Montacute Priory by the Count of Mortain and was then held by the Priory until 1539 when it became confiscated by the Crown during the Reformation. It was then passed to the Fermour family who divided it up and sold to various local landowners. By 1602 the Harbins of Newton Surmaville began buying back the divided Manor and rebuilt the Manor house then known as the Courthouse. It was designated as a Grade II listed building in April 1961. The remains of an ancient castle moat are still evident.
