= Rosa 'de Rescht' =

Type of rose

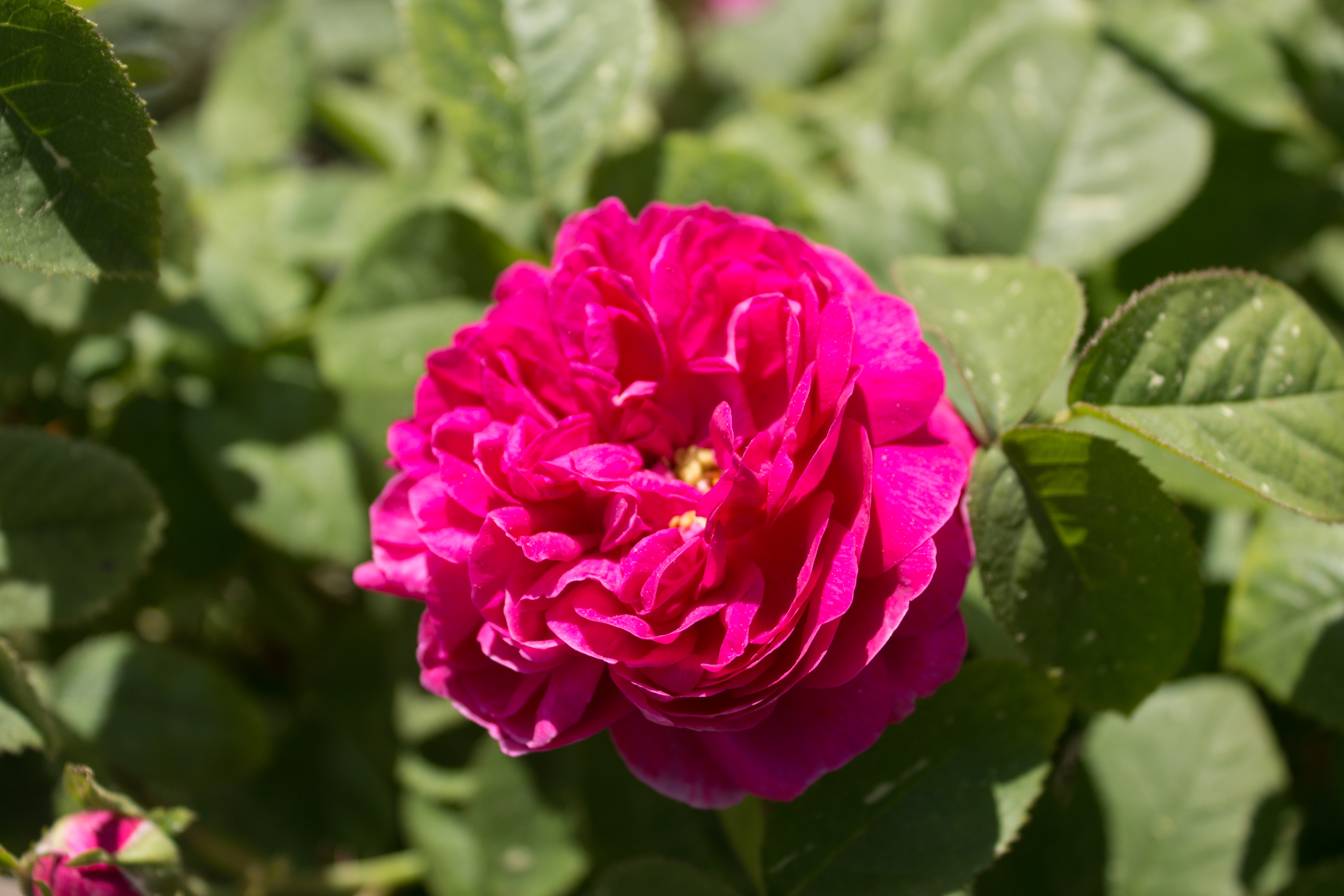
- Genus: Rosa hybrid
- Hybrid parentage: Rosa × damascena
- Cultivar group: Portland
- Cultivar: de Rescht
- Origin: unknown (rediscovered in Rasht, 1945)

Rosa 'de Rescht' is a Portland Damask rose introduced by English gardener Nancy Lindsay in 1945. In the first part of her book The Genus Rosa, Ellen Willmott described a rose that is known by the Gilaks as "Gul e Reschti", which is probably the same as Rose de Rescht.

== History ==
The history of the flower is unclear and its origin is unknown; according to some researches done in France and England by the members of the WFRS Specialized Conservation Committee, the rose was originally introduced "about 1880" as a Persian rose and, in some sources, its origin is French. It seems that this rose originating in Iran was reported in the year 1880 in England, then in the year 1890 in Germany, but it was then forgotten and was not reintroduced to England until 1940–1950, when it was rediscovered in Rasht.

== Description ==
Rosa de Rescht's bloom form is double, their color is deep pink (dp) and they are highly fragrant. The plant has large, medium green foliage, grows about 90 to 120 centimetres (36–48 in) high and 60–90 centimetres (24–36 in) wide. It is winter hardy down to USDA Zone 4b −31.7 °C (-25 °F) . Flowering time is late spring/early summer; it blooms repeatedly. It is resistant to black spot, mildew and rust. Its soil pH requirement is 5.6 to 6.5 (acidic to mildly acidic). It can be propagated by softwood cuttings, semi-hardwood cuttings, hardwood cuttings, grafting and budding.

== Namesake ==
Lindsay named the cultivar 'de Rescht' after the city of Rasht, the capital of Gilan Province, Iran, located along the southern coast of the Caspian Sea, where she discovered it to be growing.
