= Church of St Margaret, Tintinhull =

Church in Somerset, England

Church of St Margaret
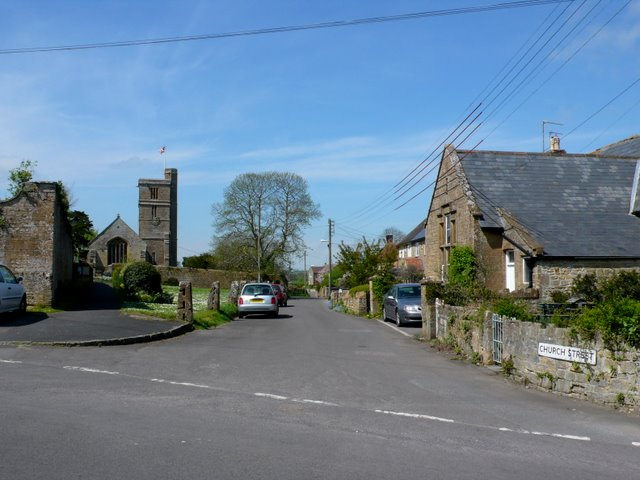
- Church Street

- Location within Somerset
- 50°58′28″N 2°42′57″W
- Location: Tintinhull, Somerset, England

History
- Built: 13th century

Listed Building – Grade I
- Official name: Church of St Margaret
- Designated: 19 April 1961
- Reference no.: 1235407

The Church of St Margaret in Tintinhull, Somerset, England, dates from the 13th century and has been designated as a Grade I listed building.

There was a church in the village during the 12th century which was replaced by the present building. It was associated with Montacute Priory, as part of its foundation estate which was granted by William, Count of Mortain and remained linked to the Priory until the dissolution of the monasteries.

The original building was remodelled with the addition of a chancel arch in the 14th century, with the perpendicular windows of the nave being added in the 15th. The interior includes a 15th-century octagonal font and an altar table and octagonal panelled timber pulpit from the 17th century.

It has a four-stage tower with the top stage, parapet and the north-east stair turret being added to the original 13th-century work during 1516 and 1517. The earlier three-stage tower is in the Early English Period and supported by angle buttresses. The tower has five bells.

It has the old parsonage, which is now called Tintinhull Court.

The church is now part of the United Benefice of Tintinhull, Chilthorne Domer, Yeovil Marsh & Thorne Coffin, within the Diocese of Bath and Wells.

== See also ==
- List of Grade I listed buildings in South Somerset
- List of towers in Somerset
- List of ecclesiastical parishes in the Diocese of Bath and Wells
