= Hidcote Bartrim =

Hamlet in Gloucestershire, England

Coordinates: 52.083580°N 1.736164°W

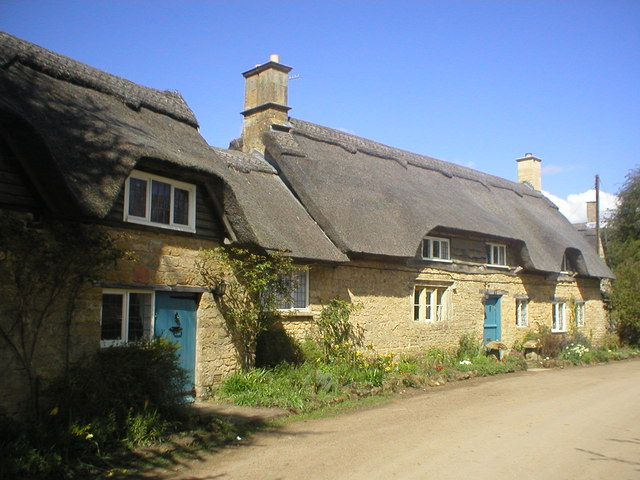
- Thatched cottages in Hidcote Bartrim

- Location within Gloucestershire
- Population: 25
- OS grid reference: SP1817642836
- Civil parish: Ebrington
- District: Cotswold
- Shire county: Gloucestershire
- Region: South West
- Country: England
- Sovereign state: United Kingdom
- Post town: CHIPPING CAMPDEN
- Postcode district: GL55 6
- Police: Gloucestershire
- Fire: Gloucestershire
- Ambulance: South Western

Hidcote Bartrim is a hamlet in the civil parish of Ebrington, in the Cotswold district of Gloucestershire, England. The nearest town is Chipping Campden, which is approximately 2.75 miles (4.43 km) south-west from the village. The village is on the Gloucestershire-Warwickshire border. It should not be confused with Hidcote Boyce, a similarly sized village roughly 0.5 miles (0.8 km) south of Hidcote Bartrim.

Hidcote Manor Garden is one of the best-known and most influential Arts and Crafts gardens in Britain, with its linked "rooms" of hedges, rare trees, shrubs and herbaceous borders. Created by Lawrence Johnston, it is owned by the National Trust and is open to the public.

Kiftsgate Court Gardens, created by Heather Muir in the 1920s, is also adjacent to the village.

Other major attractions include the duck pond, the field with a tree in the middle and the so-called ‘avenue of trees’. The latter affords visitors beautiful views of the Warwickshire countryside from a raised vantage point, over 600 ft above sea level.

== History ==
Hidcote Bartrim is named in the Domesday Book (1086), where it was held by the church of St Mary of Evesham.

There was one plough and two slaves in lordship and 3 hides (around 400 acres) returning 20 shillings taxable value, not a great deal. Population statistics for 1086 are lacking, although the wives of 4 villagers "who have recently died" have one plough, suggesting some sort of catastrophe in the village (which could of course have been the wars of the Conquest 1066–1075). The Abbot of St Mary gave the village to one of his knights as part of William I's military service. The connection with Evesham abbey continued for centuries, since a gift of land at Hidcote in 1484 specifically mentions 'the land of the abbey of Evesham' twice.

Hidcote Bartrim was a township of Admington Manor under the overlordship of Winchcombe Abbey. On its south eastern edge are Medieval earthwork settlement remains which are visible on aerial photographs. These remains are centred on SP 1772 4227 and consist of hollow ways, some flanked on one side by low banks. Earthwork banks also outline possible buildings. Much of Hidcote Bartrim's lands were on the escarpment and to the south east of this settlement is a hollow way that heads eastwards up onto Ebrington Hill. Some adjacent ridge and furrow would have belonged to Hidcote Bartrim. Anglo Saxon javelin head, and a bronze needle was found at Hidcote Bartrim before 1958. Eight of the ten houses existing today date from the 16th/early 18th centuries, their exteriors largely unaltered although many of the interiors were extensively adapted in the 20th century. The oldest house in the village dates from the mid 16th century with its origins in the early 15th century (some upper beams and stone work). This was probably the sole stone building in the medieval village, quite possibly lived in by the reeve or bailiff serving the abbey, since the medieval village has completely gone.

Hidcote Manor was owned by Bradenstoke Priory in Wiltshire until the Priory was disbanded by Henry VIII in around 1539.

The manor house (not to be confused with Hidcote House near Hidcote Boyce) was built in the 17th century as a farmhouse. It passed through several hands before being inherited in early 1907 from the Freeman family by John Tucker, who had farmed there since 1873.

Within a couple of months of probate being granted the estate was put up for auction. It was advertised in The Times on 22 June 1907 as a ‘valuable freehold farm comprising 287 acres’. The land would be sold with a ‘very substantial and picturesque farm house...... with lawns and large kitchen garden’.

At the auction in July 1907, the bidding had reached £6,500, at which point it was withdrawn from sale. Three weeks later Lawrence Johnston, acting on behalf of his mother, agreed to purchase the estate from John Tucker for £7,200.

Significant examples of medieval ridge and furrow are extant around the village, including curved examples which may date to the early Middle Ages.

Hidcote Bartrim became a parish in 1866, on 1 April 1935 it was abolished and merged with Ebrington. In 1931 the parish had a population of 47.

== Etymology ==
The addition of ‘Bartrim’ and ‘Boyce’ to the Hidcote villages may refer to former tenants. ‘Boyce’ may refer to a record of a de Bois family, whilst ‘Bartrim’ may be a corruption of ‘Bertram’, a known English name.

== Major goods and services ==
Approximately 15% of the population are concerned with academic or educational output, making this the most significant sector in the village, comprising arts, science and humanities in roughly equal share. This vastly exceeds the UK average. This is illustrated in the figures for educational standards. 8% of the population of Hidcote Bartrim are educated to a doctoral level, which is around two hundred times the UK level of around 0.04%. Around 10% of the local population are employed in local agriculture. Other notable employers include the National Health Service and University of Northampton.

Tourism, retail and agriculture make up close to 100% of the village's income, although textiles form a small yet important element of local trade.

== Amenities ==
Hidcote Manor Garden offers a café, gift shop and second-hand book shed. They also maintain a small garden centre where flowers, shrubs, herbs and garden ornaments may be purchased.

== Access ==
By road, there are three main routes to Hidcote Bartrim. Firstly, the village can be approached from the north by climbing Coleman's Hill. From the west Baker's Hill can be taken, and from the east a road can be taken from the larger Lark Stoke to Ebrington road, though this route is treacherous and poorly maintained.

Traffic in the village can be unusually congested for a settlement of this size, due to high visitor numbers at the two nearby gardens.

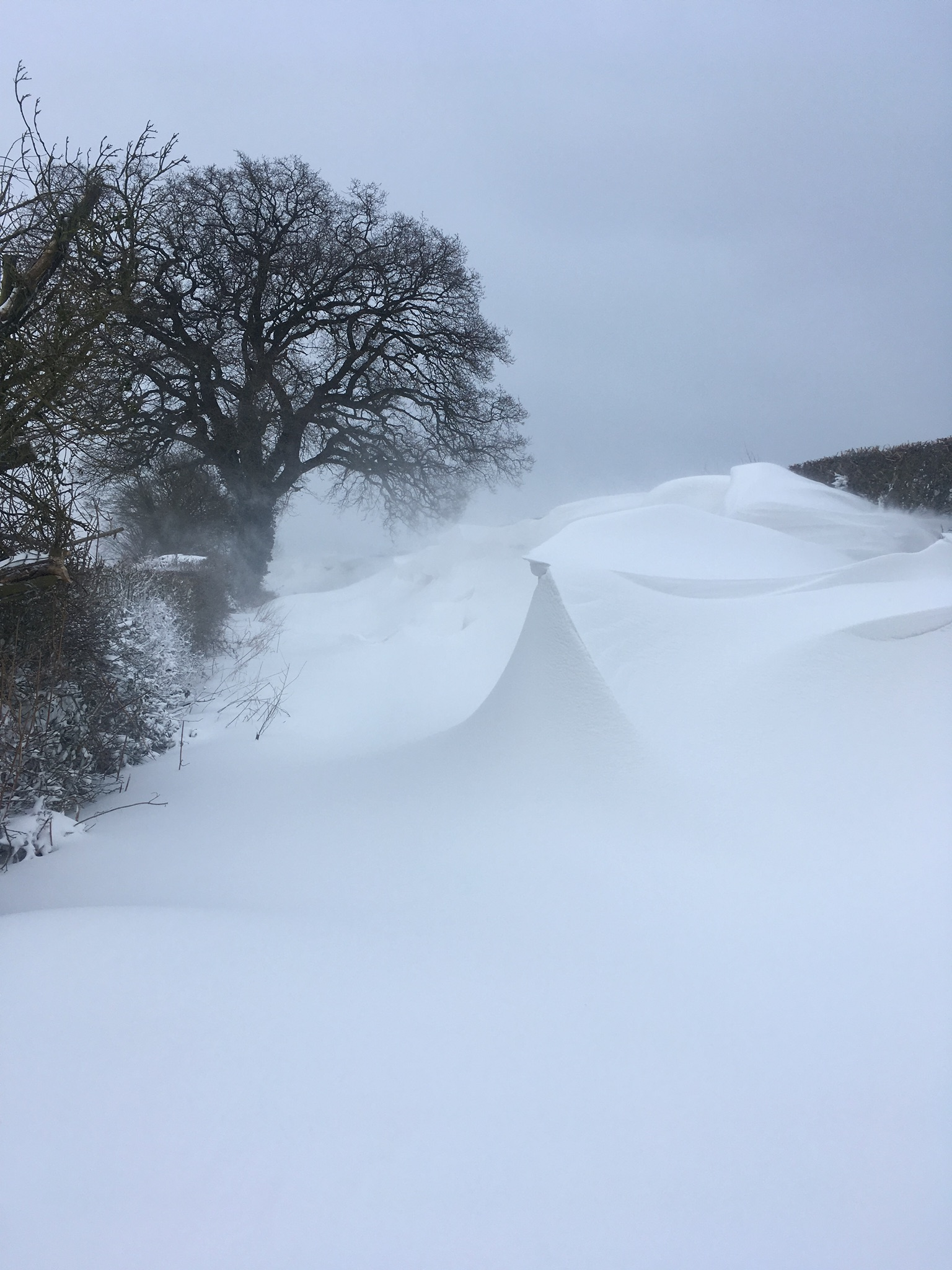
Heavy snowfall can prevent access to Hidcote. Taken March 2018.

By foot, the Monarch's Way can bring visitors to the village either from the north via Admington or from the south via Chipping Campden. A bridleway from Ilmington also adjoins the aforementioned eastern route at the summit of Ebrington Hill.

== Housing ==
The National Trust own all property in the village and act as landlord to each of the ten domestic dwellings. It is believed that these properties occupy an inalienable status, meaning that under the current National Trust regulations, they may not be sold.

There are ten dwellings, including two substantial farmhouses. Most of the smaller cottages have thatched roofs.

== Demographics ==
The ethnic make-up of the population is, as of April 2018, as follows:

- White British: 92.3%
- White non-British: 7.7%

== Wildlife ==
Deer, foxes, badgers, squirrels, rabbits and other small mammals are common sights in Hidcote Bartrim, as well as frogs and a large variety of birds, including at least one pair of red kites. Great crested newts and smooth newts are also common. An invasive species of ant, Lasius neglectus, is also present, which is frequently described as a pest by residents and has been identified as a major fire risk.

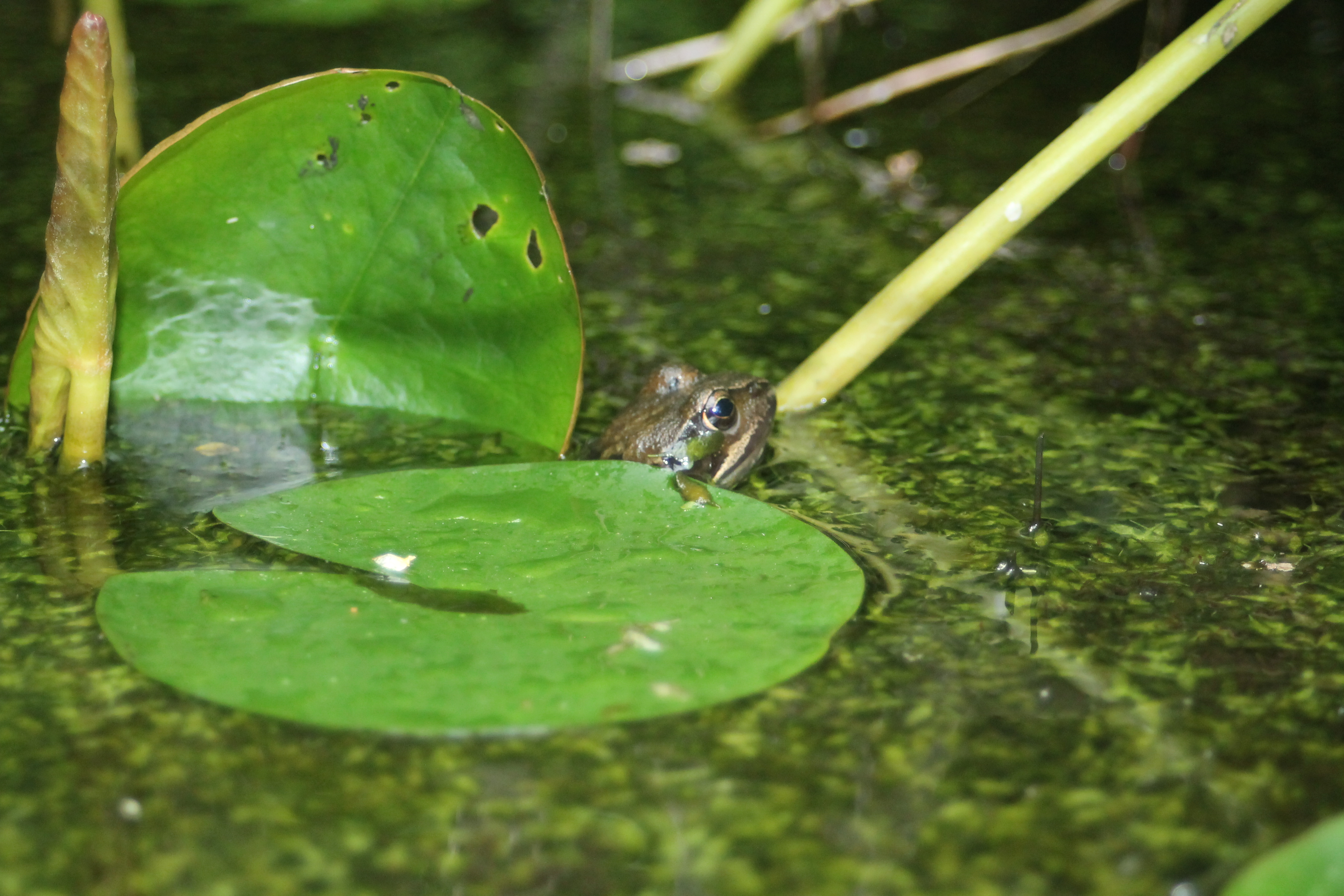
A frog in a Hidcote pond

Hidcote lavender, another name for Lavandula angustifolia, also takes its name from the village.
