= Phyllis Reiss =

UK garden designer (1886 - 1961)

- Born: Phyllis Emily Lucas; 3 October 1886; Berkhamsted
- Died: 1961 (aged 74–75)
- Occupation: Garden designer
- Known for: designing Tintinhull Gardens
- Spouse: Capt. F.E. Reiss

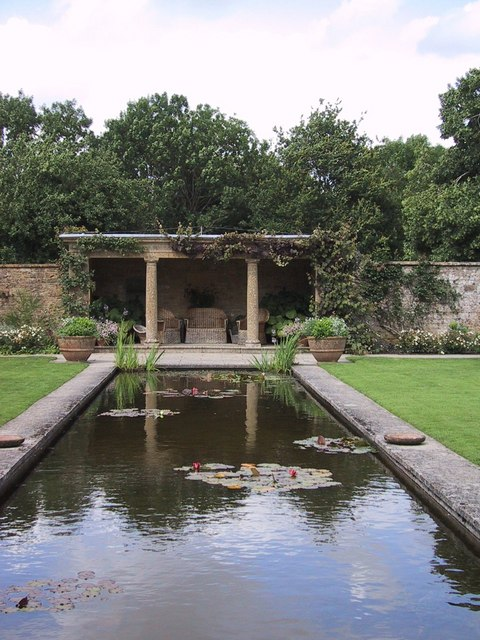
The Formal Gardens behind Tintinhull House in 2001

Phyllis Emily Reiss born Phyllis Emily Lucas (3 3October 1886 – 1961) was a British garden designer noted for her work at her own Tintinhull Garden, and Montacute House.

== Life ==
Reiss was born in Berkhamsted in Hertfordshire. Her parents were Edith Hamilton (born Crake) and Colonel Alfred George Lucas. Her father had been in the army and he served as High Sheriff of Suffolk in 1904 and as a mayor of Lowestoft.

They had a substantial home at Dowdeswell Manor in the Cotswolds near to Hidcote Manor Gardens.

In 1933 Reiss and her husband, Capt. F. E. Reiss, bought Tintinhull House and Garden. The garden layout had been developed by Dr. Price who had created triangular and diamond-shaped flagstone paths and ornamental domes of box were planted in the 1920s.

The existing early landscaping was expanded by Reiss starting in 1933 in an Arts and Crafts "Hidcote" style. The 1.5 acres (0.61 ha) garden was separated into "rooms" by yew hedges and walls. The different areas included Eagle Court, Middle Garden, Fountain Garden and Pool Garden. The pool garden was their only additional area and it was created on the site of a former tennis court. This pool garden was a memorial to a nephew who had lost his life during the war above Malta. A painting of him, Michael Lucas, is at Tintinhull.

In 1954 Reiss gave the house and garden to the National Trust, but she continued to live in the house and care for the garden.

== Death and legacy ==
Reiss died in 1961 and the National Trust continue to look after the property. The house's later tenants included the garden designer and writer Penelope Hobhouse and her husband Prof John Malins from 1980 to 1993. Reiss's carefree planting was said to have had a strong influence of Hobhouse as well as Dame Sylvia Crowe and the American born designer Lanning Roper.
