= St Mary's Church, Mudford =

Church in Somerset, England

Church of St Mary
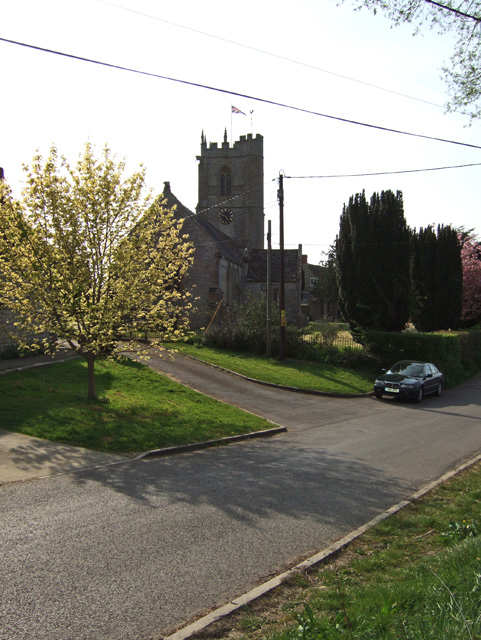

- Location within Somerset
- 50°58′37″N 2°36′27″W
- Location: Mudford, Somerset, England

History
- Built: 14th century

Listed Building – Grade I
- Official name: Church of Saint Mary
- Designated: 19 April 1961
- Reference no.: 1056790

The Church of St Mary in Mudford, Somerset, England, dates from the 14th century and has been designated as a Grade I listed building.

The church was granted by Montacute Priory to the Bishop of Bath and Wells in 1339. The interior includes a Jacobean pulpit and a stone font from the 15th century.

It has a 66 feet (20 m) high three-stage tower, which dates from around 1498, divided by string courses with clasping corner buttresses, a battlemented parapet with small corner and intermediate pinnacles, and corner gargoyles. There is a stair turret on the north-east corner with a weathervane finial, and a clock face on the east side. It contains five bells dated 1582, 1621, 1623, 1664 and 1666, all by the Purdue family of nearby Closworth. The tower was rebuilt in 1309 and again in the early 20th century following a lightning strike.

The parish is part of the benefice of Chilton Cantelo, Ashington, Marston Magna, Mudford and Rimpton within the Yeovil deanery.

Due to the condition of the high level stonework the church has been added to the Heritage at Risk Register; however repairs were undertaken in 2013 to correct this.

The church graveyard is the resting place of Bishop Bill Flagg, the first Bishop of Northern Argentina and Paraguay, who was born and raised in Mudford.

== See also ==
- Grade I listed buildings in South Somerset
- List of Somerset towers
- List of ecclesiastical parishes in the Diocese of Bath and Wells
