= Mudford =

Village in England

Coordinates: 50.9733°N 2.6066°W

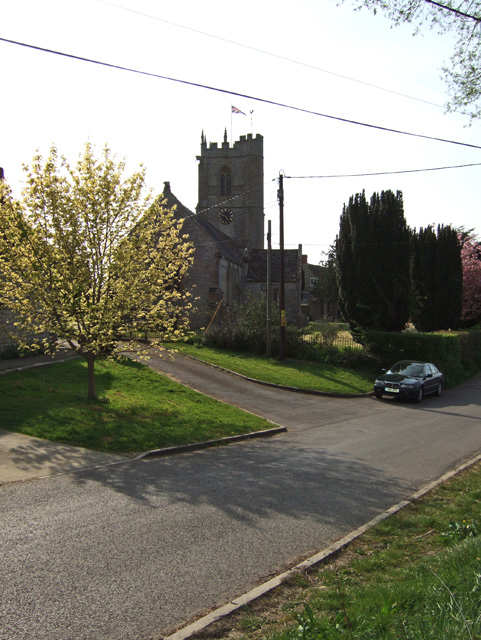
- Church of St Mary, Mudford

- Location within Somerset
- Population: 696 (2011)
- OS grid reference: ST575195
- Unitary authority: Somerset
- Ceremonial county: Somerset
- Region: South West
- Country: England
- Sovereign state: United Kingdom
- Post town: YEOVIL
- Postcode district: BA21
- Dialling code: 01935
- Police: Avon and Somerset
- Fire: Devon and Somerset
- Ambulance: South Western
- UK Parliament: Glastonbury and Somerton

Mudford is a village and parish in Somerset, England, situated 3 miles (4.8 km) from Yeovil in the South Somerset district on the River Yeo. The village has a population of 696. The parish includes the hamlets of Mudford Sock, West Mudford and Up Mudford.

The village lies on the Monarch's Way, a 615 miles (990 km) long-distance footpath that approximates the escape route taken by King Charles II in 1651 after being defeated in the Battle of Worcester.

== History ==
At the time of the Domesday Book in 1086 there were five manors. The largest which was given with the church to Montacute Priory in 1192, became Mudford Monachorum (of the monks) and was centred on the present hamlet of Up Mudford. The parish of Mudford was part of the Stone Hundred.

At the eastern end of the parish on the border with Dorset, the village of Nether Adber was held by Siward the Fowler before and after the Battle of Hastings, and had a chapel in 1351 but the village was totally abandoned in the mid-16th century.

Manor Farm House, the Manor house of Up Mudford, was built in 1630 on the site of an earlier building after a fire.

== Governance ==
The parish council has responsibility for local issues, including setting an annual precept (local rate) to cover the council’s operating costs and producing annual accounts for public scrutiny. The parish council evaluates local planning applications and works with the local police, district council officers, and neighbourhood watch groups on matters of crime, security, and traffic. The parish council's role also includes initiating projects for the maintenance and repair of parish facilities, as well as consulting with the district council on the maintenance, repair, and improvement of highways, drainage, footpaths, public transport, and street cleaning. Conservation matters (including trees and listed buildings) and environmental issues are also the responsibility of the council.

For local government purposes, since 1 April 2023, the parish comes under the unitary authority of Somerset Council. Prior to this, it was part of the non-metropolitan district of South Somerset (established under the Local Government Act 1972). It was part of Yeovil Rural District before 1974.

It is also part of the Glastonbury and Somerton county constituency represented in the House of Commons of the Parliament of the United Kingdom. It elects one Member of Parliament (MP) by the first past the post system of election.

== Religious sites ==
Mudford is served by the church of St Mary The Virgin, which dates back to the 12th century and is a Grade I listed building. It has a three-stage tower divided by string courses with clasping corner buttresses, a battlemented parapet with small corner and intermediate pinnacles, and corner gargoyles. There is a stair turret on the north-east corner with a weathervane finial, and a clock face on the east side. It contains five bells dated 1582, 1621, 1623, 1664 and 1666, all by the Purdue family of nearby Closworth. It was granted by Montacute Priory to the Bishop of Bath and Wells in 1339.
