= Tintinhull =

Village and civil parish in Somerset, England

Coordinates: 50.97361°N 2.71484°W

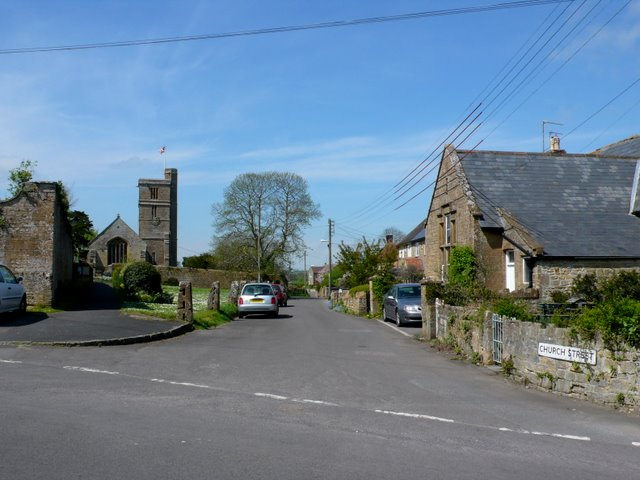
- Church Street and the Church of St Margaret

- Location within Somerset
- Population: 1,124 (2011)
- OS grid reference: ST497195
- Unitary authority: Somerset Council
- Ceremonial county: Somerset
- Region: South West
- Country: England
- Sovereign state: United Kingdom
- Post town: YEOVIL
- Postcode district: BA22
- Dialling code: 01935
- Police: Avon and Somerset
- Fire: Devon and Somerset
- Ambulance: South Western
- UK Parliament: Glastonbury and Somerton

Tintinhull is a village and civil parish near Yeovil, 2.5 miles (4 km) south west of Ilchester, in Somerset, England. The village is close to the A303. It is on the Fosse Way.

In addition to a school of around 100 pupils, Tintinhull has a church, park, swimming pool and other amenities.

== History ==
The village was mentioned in the Domesday Book of 1086. The surrounding landscape shows evidence of 2000 years of farming.

The parish was headquarters and part of the Tintinhull Hundred.

== Governance ==
The parish council has responsibility for local issues, including setting an annual precept (local rate) to cover the council’s operating costs and producing annual accounts for public scrutiny. The parish council evaluates planning applications and works with the police, district council officers, and neighbourhood watch groups on matters of crime, security, and traffic. The council's role also includes initiating projects for the maintenance and repair of parish facilities, as well as consulting with the district council on the maintenance, repair, and improvement of highways, drainage, footpaths, public transport, and street cleaning. Conservation matters (including trees and listed buildings) and environmental issues are also the responsibility of the council.

For local government purposes, since 1 April 2023, the parish comes under the unitary authority of Somerset Council. Prior to this, it was part of the non-metropolitan district of South Somerset (established under the Local Government Act 1972). It was part of Yeovil Rural District before 1974.

It is also part of the Glastonbury and Somerton county constituency represented in the House of Commons of the Parliament of the United Kingdom. It elects one Member of Parliament (MP) by the first past the post system of election.

== Landmarks ==
Most of the buildings are of honey-coloured Ham stone. These include several 16th-, 17th- and 18th-century dwellings such as the 17th-century Tintinhull House at Tintinhull Garden which is now National Trust property, and Tintinhull Court.

== Religious sites ==
The Church of St Margaret has origins in the 13th century and has been designated by English Heritage a Grade I listed building, as has the old parsonage which is now called Tintinhull Court.
