= Three Ways House Hotel =

English hotel known for pudding dining event

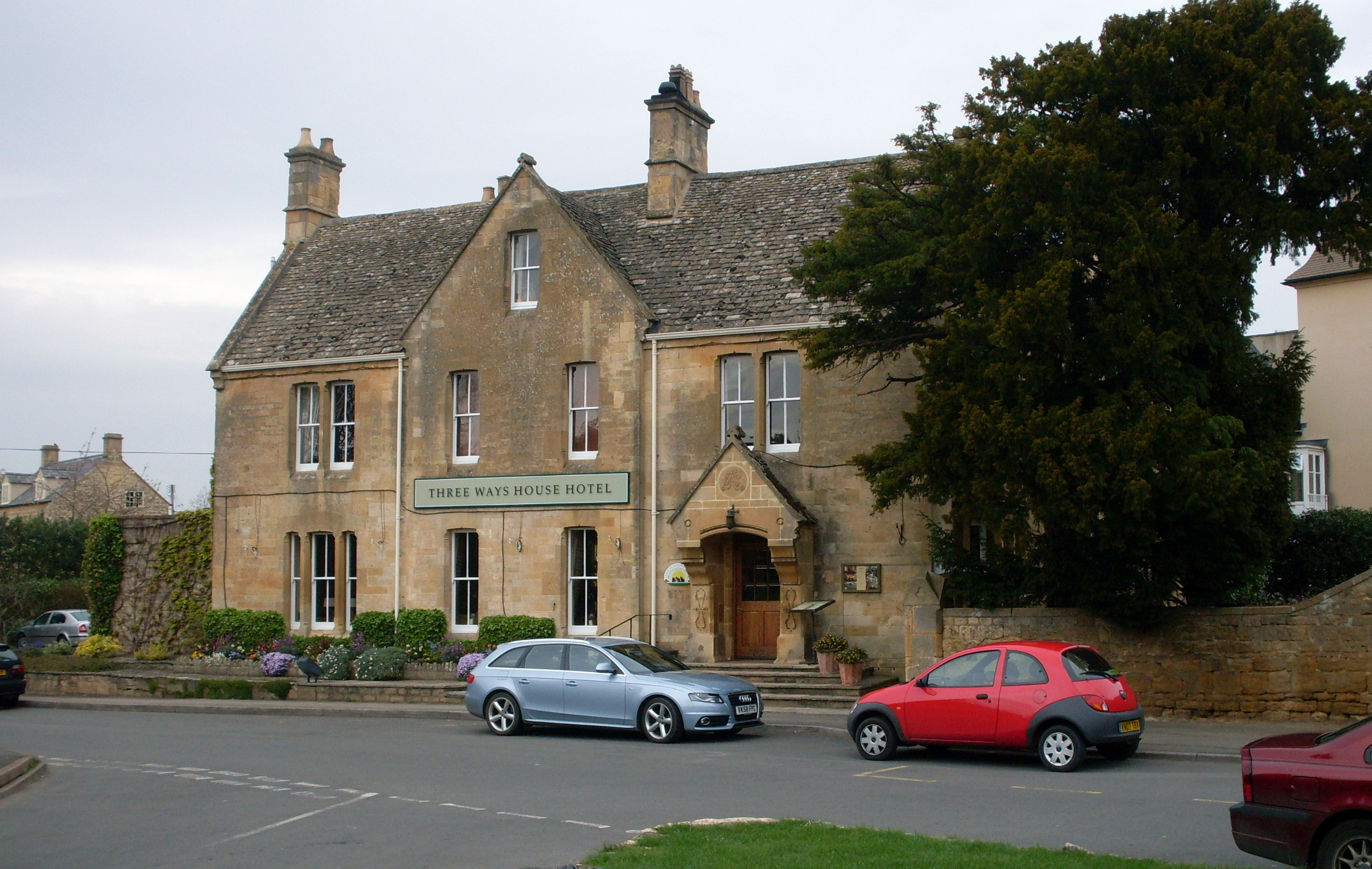
- Three Ways House Hotel in 2009

- Location within England

General information
- Location: Mickleton, Gloucestershire, England
- Coordinates: 52°5′28.33″N 1°46′1.36″W
- Owner: Shepherd Cox
- Management: Best Western

Other information
- Number of rooms: 48
- Number of suites: 7
- Number of restaurants: 1 + 1 bar

Website
- www.threewayshousehotel.com

Three Ways House Hotel is a hotel in Mickleton, Gloucestershire, England. Built in 1871 as a house for a doctor, the now hotel features a weekly dining event, called the Pudding Club, that celebrates British desserts.

== History ==
The main building was built in 1871 by a local doctor. The property was operating as a hotel by 1985. It was owned by Jean and Keith Turner. It was bought, in 1995, by Jill and Simon Coombe and Peter Henderson, who retired in 2013. As of 2016, the hotel had 45 staff members and an AA silver star rating. In 2018, the property was sold to Shepherd Cox upon retirement by the Coombes.

== Architecture and design ==
The public areas of the interior are designed with green and brown shades and feature fireplaces and tile floors. There are 48 hotel rooms, whose blankets made by the Cotswold Woollen Mill. Seven of the rooms are dessert-themed suites, aligning with the hotel's weekly Pudding Club event. The suites include the "Spotted Dick Room", "Sticky Toffee Room", the "Chocolate Suite" and the "Oriental Ginger Syrup Sponge Room."

== Dining ==
The Three Ways House Hotel has one restaurant, Randalls Bar and Brasserie. The restaurant serves Modern British cuisine using locally sourced ingredients. They offer breakfast and dinner, with a breakfast buffet complimentary for hotel guests. Dinner entrees include steaks, pasta, and slow-cooked breast of lamb with minted spring greens and smoked chicken ballotine with a Parmesan salad.

=== The Pudding Club ===
The Pudding Club was started in 1985 by the owners Jean and Keith Turner. The formation of the "club" served two goals: popularising the British pudding and as a snarky protest against nouvelle cuisine. Every Friday, up to sixty diners gather to eat pudding and other British desserts in a designated Pudding Club room at Randalls. The event is hosted by the Pudding Master, a staff member who creates the weekly menu. The Pudding Master serves as master of ceremonies and may even make the desserts themselves. As of 2021, the Pudding Master is Lucy Williams.

Guests are offered a small non-dessert meal before the event. The menu comprises seven different types of puddings presented as a buffet. Puddings are paraded around the room in a ceremony before being served. Diners may request multiple portions of their favorites to eat. Pudding Club rules dictate that diners can only eat one portion of pudding at a time and that they cannot order another portion until they finish their current portion. Guests are not allowed to hide or sneak away with pudding, either. Guests who eat all seven of their puddings by the end of the experience receive a certificate. As of 2010, the record for the amount of puddings eaten by one individual was 24.
