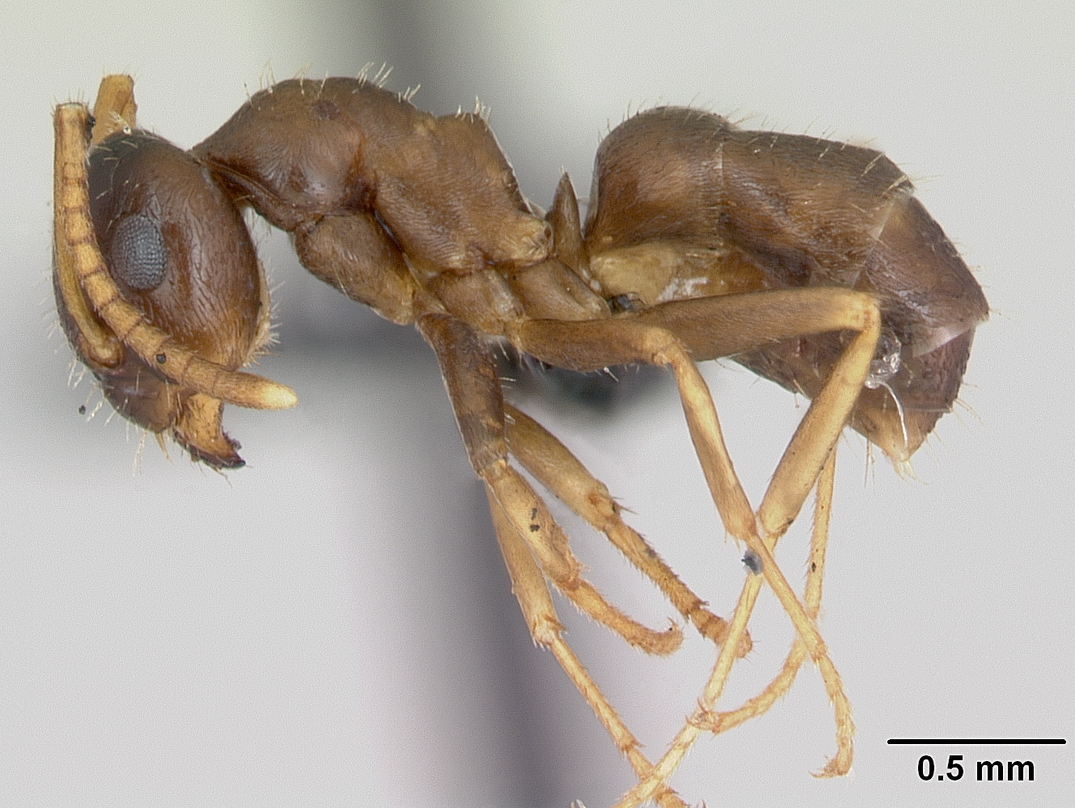
- L. neglectus worker from Belgium

Scientific classification
- Kingdom: Animalia
- Phylum: Arthropoda
- Clade: Pancrustacea
- Class: Insecta
- Order: Hymenoptera
- Family: Formicidae
- Subfamily: Formicinae
- Genus: Lasius
- Species: L. neglectus

Binomial name
- Lasius neglectus Van Loon, Boomsma & Andrásfalvy, 1990

= Lasius neglectus =

Species of ant

Lasius neglectus is a polygynous, sometimes invasive, ant of the genus Lasius. The ant was identified in 1990 after establishing a colony in Budapest, Hungary. It is native to Eurasia and Central Asia, primary to regions including Uzbekistan, Turkey (Asia Minor), and Iran. Superficially, they are similar in appearance to the common black garden ant, Lasius niger, but have significantly different behavioural patterns, particularly in the social structure within colonies. .

Lasius neglectus is believed to be prey for several animals and insects, specifically Clytra laeviuscula and some Picidae family birds.

== Colonies ==
Lasius neglectus occupies 'super colonies', systems of interconnected nests with many queens, estimated to be over 35,500 in some colonies. Queens are capable of flight and the independent founding of colonies, but nuptial flight is optional: in some parts of their range, it does not occur annually, and in others, it probably never occurs. In any case, many queens mate within the nests and never leave them, reproducing within the maternal colony. As the occupants of these colonies are related, they do not demonstrate territorial aggression.

Lasius neglectus does not build elaborate nests, instead, the species usually nests under flat stones, in the topsoil under leaf litter and even in trash piles. In human habitats, L. neglectus tends to nest inside electrical devices. Like other invasive ant species, L. neglectus relies on honeydew for its main food source and, but for a single instance in a grassland without trees in Tbilisi, known food sources come exclusively from insect prey and honeydew-producing insects on trees.

=== Social immunity ===
L. neglectus was the first ant species to be observed performing "destructive disinfection" to their brood, wherein tending ants find pupae infected with Metarhizium brunneum, a parasitic fungus. The tending ants then bite into the cuticle of the pupa and spray it with antiseptic poison to kill both the pupa and the fungus. While getting rid of the parasitic fungi, colonies are exposed to the Metahizium species. Sometimes, this leads to a protective immunity to future low-level exposures to this fungi for the surviving colony members.

== As pests ==
Lasius neglectus can outnumber native European varieties of ant by 10 to 100 times in infested gardens and, as such, has been considered a pest in many central European countries. The species has spread as far as Jena in Germany, Ghent in Belgium and Warsaw in Poland. A colony has been reported in Hidcote Bartrim, Gloucestershire in England, where it demonstrates an affinity for outdoor electrical fittings where it may constitute a fire risk.

Similar to many other invasive species, L. neglectus has so far only been found to infest disturbed urban habitats such as parks and gardens, where it eradicates most native ants and other insect populations while damaging trees because of the massive aphid cultures that it maintains. Whereas most other known pest ants require warm temperatures to thrive, L. neglectus can survive winters with extended frost periods, so that further dispersal into temperate climatic zones seems unavoidable. Asia Minor has been suggested as the most likely region of origin of L. neglectus as it co-occurs here with its non-invasive sister-species L. turcicus.

The species has been proposed as a candidate to become a similar problem to the Argentine ant (Linepithema humile).
