= Serre de la Madone =

Garden in France

Coordinates: 43.7755°N 7.4755°E

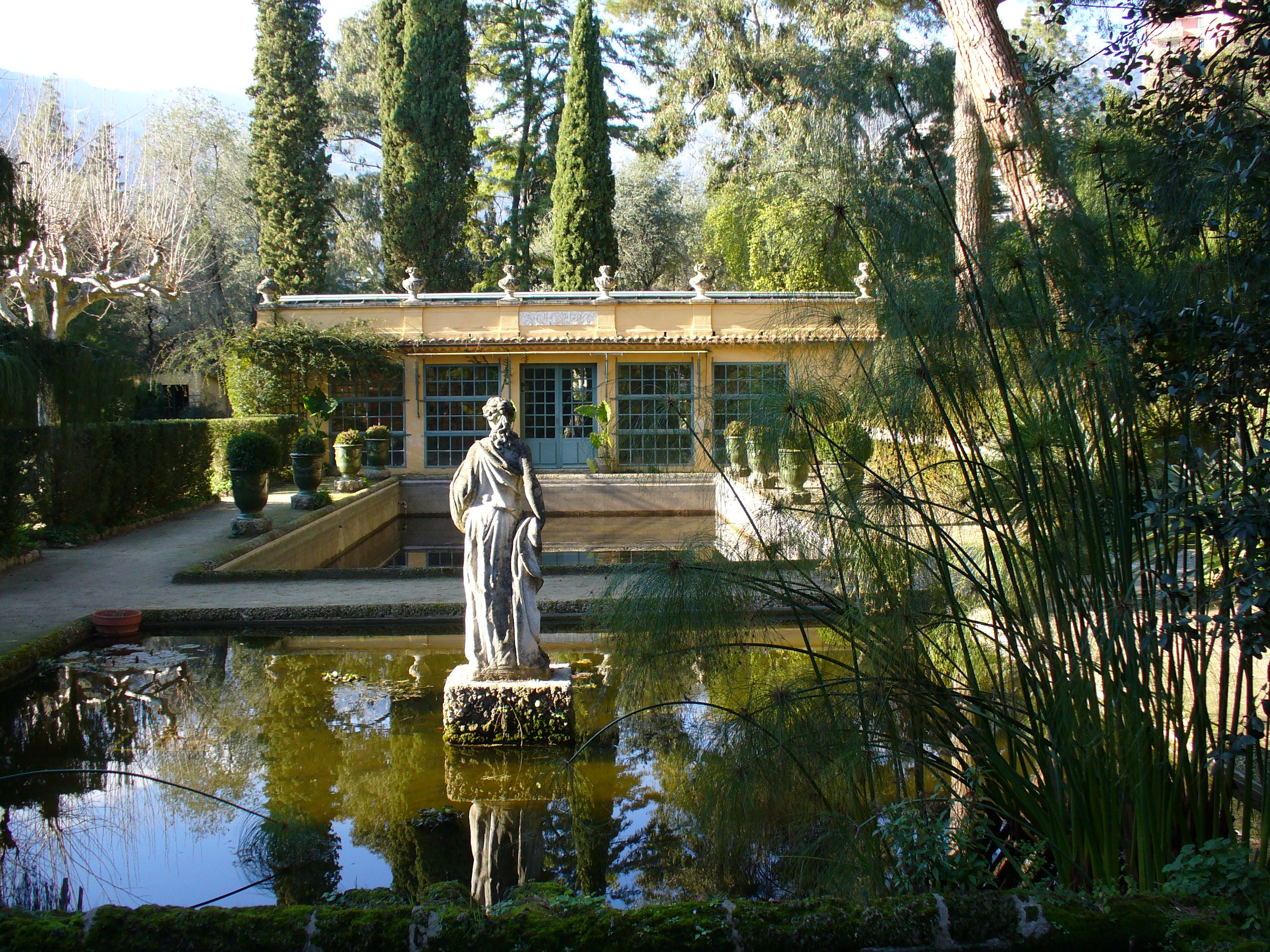
Serre de la Madone

Serre de la Madone (6 hectares) is a garden in France notable for its design and rare plantings. It is located at 74, Route de Gorbio, Menton, Alpes-Maritimes, Provence-Alpes-Côte d'Azur, France. It is open to the public (every day except Monday) during the warm months of the year. In 2008, it was being restored to its former condition.

The garden was created in 1924–1939 by Lawrence Johnston, who had earlier created in Britain the celebrated Hidcote Manor Garden (1907). It lies on a hillside in the Gorbio valley, with a farmhouse to which Johnston added two large wings. Johnston traveled the world collecting plants, and Serre de la Madone offered an excellent site for plants from subtropical regions. Over the years he created a series of terraces among old olive trees, planted and tended by twelve gardeners.

After Johnston's death in 1958 owners maintained it with varying degrees of respect for the original plantings. In 1999 the property was purchased by the non-profit Conservatoire du littoral, who began restoring it to Johnson's design.

Today the garden contains a collection of unusual subtropical plants centered on a double pool, and rising in terraces. As at Hidcote, Johnson used hedges and low walls to divide the garden into discrete areas. Notable plant specimens include a superb Mahonia siamensis and Arbutus unedo, umbrella pines, Buddleja officinalis, Rosa chinensis, and bamboo, as well as good collections of cycads and succulents from around the world.

== See also ==
- Gardens of Provence-Alpes-Côte d'Azur
- List of botanical gardens in France
