= Tintinhull Garden =

Grade I listed house in South Somerset, UK

Tintinhull House and Garden
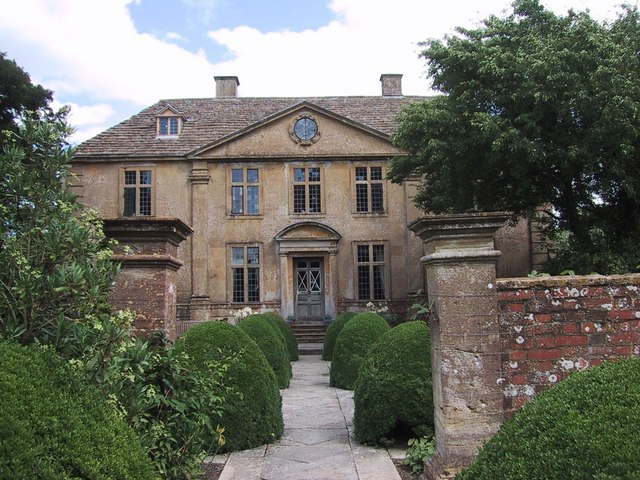
- The gate piers and path leading to the front of the house.

- Location within Somerset
- 50°58′28″N 2°42′26″W
- Location: Tintinhull, Somerset, England

History
- Built: 17th century

Listed Building – Grade I
- Designated: 19 April 1961
- Reference no.: 1265231

National Register of Historic Parks and Gardens
- Type: Grade II
- Designated: 1 June 1984
- Reference no.: 1001156

Tintinhull Garden, located in Tintinhull, near Yeovil in the English county of Somerset, is a small (less than an acre) 20th century garden surrounding a 17th-century Grade I listed house. The property is in the ownership of the National Trust. It is visited by around 25,000 people per year.

The house started as a small farmhouse in 1630 but was enlarged into its current form in the 18th century. The house was the property of the Napper family for centuries. It was given to the National Trust in 1954. The garden is similar in style to that at Hidcote Manor Garden in Gloucestershire, with several garden rooms. It was originally laid out by Phyllis Reiss from 1933, and from 1979 to 1993 was in the charge of the garden writer and gardener Penelope Hobhouse.

== House ==
The original farmhouse which forms the basis of the current Tintinhull House was built of Hamstone 1630. It was reshaped and enlarged around 1722 when the west façade was added.

The house was the property of the Napper family, who acquired the manor after the dissolution of the monasteries and also owned Tintinhull Court, and was passed down in the family until they sold it sometime after 1814.

The Nappers let it to the Pitt family until the death of John Napper in 1791. It passed through several hands until 1835, when it was bought by Jeremiah Penny. In 1898 the then owner, Arthur Cobbett, added a single-storey extension to the east front before selling it to his tenant the botanist, Dr. S.J.M. Price. In 1933 it was bought by Phyllis Reiss and her husband, Capt. F.E. Reiss.

The house includes several paintings from the National Trust's collection, including a painting of the front of the house by John S. Goodall.

The house is a Grade I listed building and can be booked for holiday lets from the National Trust.

== Garden ==
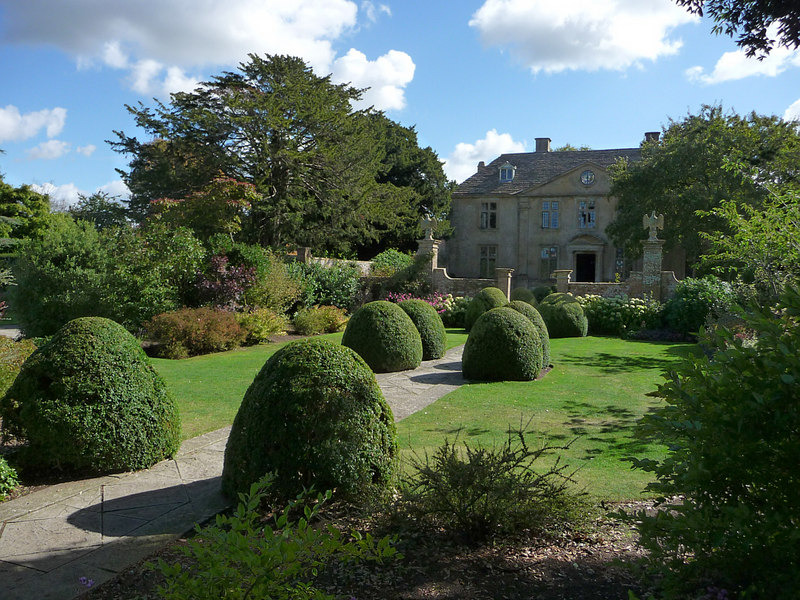
Part of the garden

The garden is laid out into areas separated by walls and hedges.

The garden layout was developed in the early 20th century, by Dr. Price, including laying down triangular and diamond shaped flagstone paths. The ornamental domes of box were planted in the 1920s. The early landscaping was expanded and planted starting in 1933 by Phyllis Reiss in a "Hidcote" style. The 1.5 acres (0.61 ha) garden is separated into "garden rooms" by yew hedges and walls. The different areas include Eagle Court (the former courtyard), Middle Garden, Fountain Garden and Pool Garden. The pool garden is the site of a former tennis court.

In 1954 Reiss gave the house and garden to the National Trust, but continued to live in the house and care for the garden until her death in 1961. From then on, the Trust let the house to a variety of tenants, including the garden designer and writer Penelope Hobhouse and her husband Prof John Malins from 1980 to 1993.

The gardens are included in the National Register of Historic Parks and Gardens and include small pools and an azalea garden.

== See also ==
- Grade I listed buildings in South Somerset
- List of National Trust properties in Somerset
