= Kiftsgate Court Gardens =

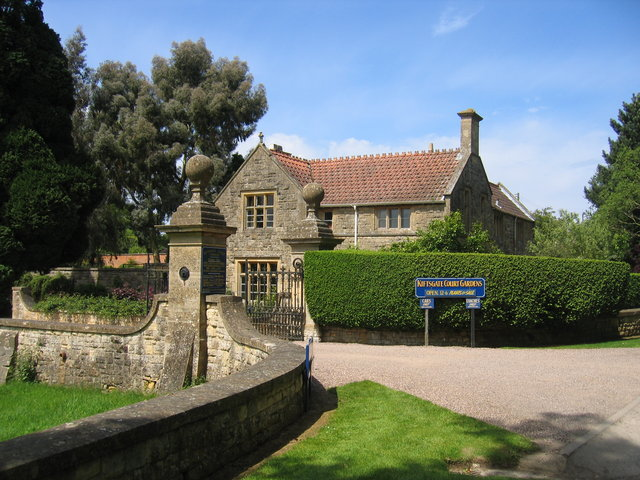
- Entrance to Kiftsgate Court House and Gardens

- Location in Gloucestershire
- 52°05′09.49″N 01°45′06.83″W
- Location: Mickleton, Gloucestershire, England

Kiftsgate Court Gardens is situated above the village of Mickleton in the county of Gloucestershire, England, in the far north of the county close to the county border with both Worcestershire and Warwickshire.

The gardens, famed for its roses, are the creation of three generations of women gardeners. Started by Heather Muir in the 1920s, continued by Diany Binny from 1950 and now looked after by Anne Chambers and her husband. Kiftsgate Court is now the home of the Chambers family.

The Kiftsgate Hundred was the ancient area surrounding Chipping Campden. Today the 'Kiftsgate Hundred' stone, where the elders met to administer justice, stands in Weston Park Wood above Chipping Campden. Included in the Hundred was Mickleton, called Mycclantune, meaning 'big village'. It is a few hundred yards from Hidcote Manor Garden owned by the National Trust.

== History ==
In about 1750 the poet and landscape gardener William Shenstone stayed at Mickleton Manor, and it was he who inspired the planting of the elm avenue which used to run between Kiftsgate Court and Mickleton Manor - now alas, destroyed by Dutch Elm Disease, along with countless other elms between 1972 and 1976. The line of Scotch firs silhouetted against the sky between Kiftsgate and the Warwickshire county boundary was also due to Shenstone's imaginative foresight, as were the lime trees bordering the front drive - although the house had not been thought of then. During the past fifty years most of these enormous trees have fallen. To replace them for future generations a row of six Tilia Petiolaris have been planted.

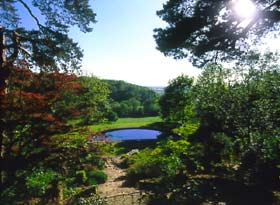
Vista to the swimming pool built during Diany Binny's time at Kiftsgate

Kiftsgate Court was built in 1887-91 by Sydney Graves Hamilton who owned the large manor house in Mickleton. An ancestor of his, Walwyn Graves (1744–1813), had built a Georgian front with a high portico on to Mickleton Manor, and it was this facade which was moved bodily up to the new site on Glyde Hill to become Kiftsgate Court. A special light railway was constructed up the elm avenue to do this and the records state that it was 'all to be done in the best manner possible and none but the very best material used'. Unfortunately a large Victorian back was built behind the Georgian facade.

Mr and Mrs J. B. Muir bought Kiftsgate in 1918 and at this time considerable internal alterations were made. A large ballroom occupying the entire wing on the first floor behind the portico was divided into bedrooms. Miss Hamilton, who owned Mickleton Manor, was said to have told Mrs Muir that the sprung floor of the ballroom was one of the most expensive items in the building of Kiftsgate. In 1954 they moved to the Front Lodge and their eldest daughter Diany Binny and her husband Tony Binny came to live at Kiftsgate.

They pulled down three sides of a courtyard containing sixteen rooms which is now the gravelled forecourt used for parking coaches. In 1974 Mrs D. Binny moved to the Front Lodge, where she lived until her death in 2005. Kiftsgate remained empty until 1981 when Diana's eldest daughter Anne and her husband Jonathan undertook major modernisation of the house making their home in the central part and creating a separate flat and tea room. Kiftsgate remains a family home as originally intended by the owner's grandparents.

== The Gardens ==
The garden at Kiftsgate up to 1920 consisted of the paved formal garden in front of the portico, beyond which was a plain grass field with wooded banks. The first thing Mrs J.B. Muir did was to make a lawn with steps leading to it from the formal paved garden, this was quickly followed by taking in what is now the Yellow Border and the Rose Border; the connecting bridge was built and the yew and copper beech hedges planted.

Many people would have thought they had achieved enough but in 1930 the steep bank was tackled, and a summer house with steps either side down to the lower garden was built.

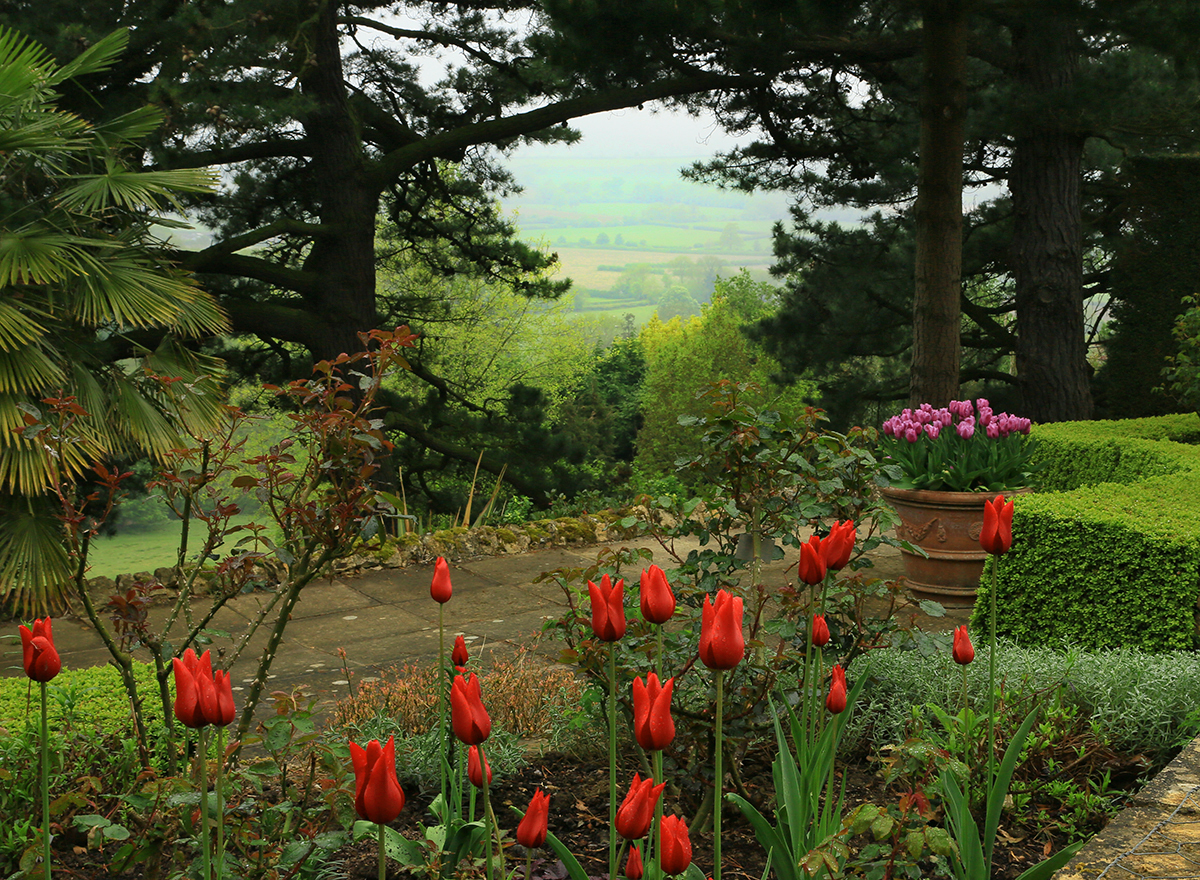
view towards Mickleton

The hard tennis court, now the modern water garden, was made in the 1930s and the yew hedge was planted around it at the same time. During the war the tennis court, which required continual watering and upkeep, was allowed to become derelict and in 1955 there was a wonderful display of seedling roses and Scotch firs growing on it, which Mrs J.B. Muir was very grieved to see go, when it was resurfaced.

In making the garden at Kiftsgate there is no doubt that Heather Muir was greatly helped and inspired by her lifelong friend Major Lawrence Johnston, who created the garden next door at Hidcote Manor. Whilst influenced by Hidcote next door, unlike Hidcote it was never formally planned and is considered by Keen (a garden designer) to be "a prettier, less organised place". The flower picture in the tea-room at Hidcote was painted directly on the wall at Kiftsgate by Major Johnson and moved to Hidcote in 1981 by the National Trust.

Kiftsgate first became well known to the gardening public after Graham Stuart Thomas's article in the Royal Horticultural Society Journal, May 1951, in which the great plantsman observed, "I regard this as the finest piece of skilled colour work that it has been my pleasure to see."

In April 1954 the magazine Gardening had an illustration of the Yellow Border on its cover and inside an article by A.G.L. Hellyer, reporting that

Each rose bush has grown to its maximum proportions and to the conventional gardener these proportions will come as a revelation. Yet despite the luxuriance of Kiftsgate it is a garden upon which an extremely firm hand and a very discerning eye have been kept. There is nothing of the wilderness here and one is immediately conscious that everything is in its place and is there for a definite purpose. That purpose is to produce a series of pictures in colour that are rich but never glaring. They are the colours I associate with fine tapestry.

== Kiftsgate rose ==
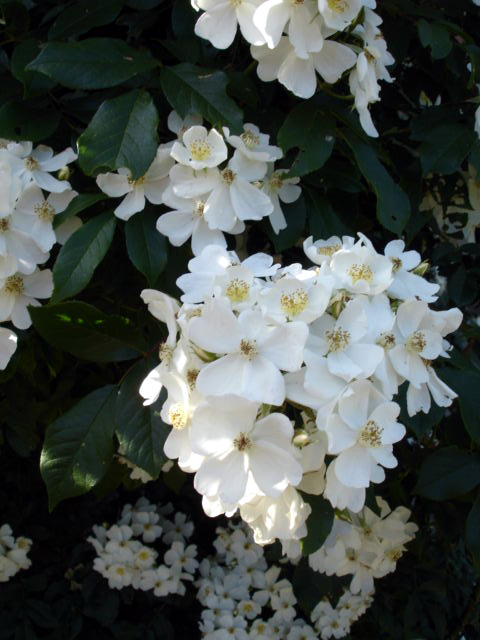
Rosa filipes

The gardens are well known for the famous Kiftsgate rose, a scented climbing rose, which is shade-tolerant and very vigorous. It is claimed that the Rosa filipes 'Kiftsgate' is the largest rose in Britain measuring 80 feet (24 m) x 90 feet x 50 feet (15 m) high at last measurement, as reported on the Kiftsgate website. It was planted in 1938 and named by Graham Stuart Thomas in 1951. The same official website says that it would be even larger were it not cut back, and the owners fear for the integrity of the beech tree which it has colonised owing to the weight of its foliage.

== Recognition ==
- The house features in England's Thousand Best Houses by Sir Simon Jenkins
- In 2003 Kiftsgate Court Gardens was named Historic Houses Association - Christie's Garden of the Year
- Kiftsgate is Germaine Greer's favourite garden
