= Tintinhull Court =

Grade I listed building in South Somerset, United Kingdom

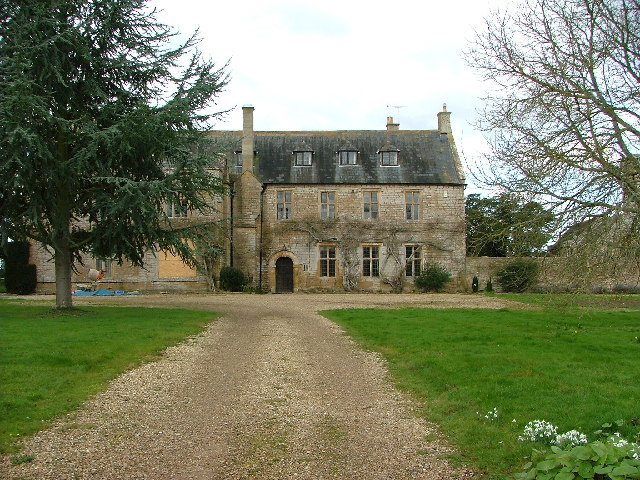

- Location within Somerset
- 50°58′29″N 2°42′56″W
- Location: Tintinhull, Somerset, England

History
- Built: Medieval era

Listed Building – Grade I
- Official name: Tintinhull Court
- Designated: 19 April 1961
- Reference no.: 1235516

Tintinhull Court in Tintinhull, Somerset, England, was built as a medieval parsonage for the Church of St Margaret. It has been designated as a Grade I listed building.

The Hamstone building was re-modelled in 1678, 1777 and 1927, with the first of these being by the prior of nearby Montacute Priory. After the dissolution of the monasteries it became crown property belonging to Henry VIII who sold it to Sir William Petre who sold it in 1546 to the Napper family who owned it for the next 250 years from their purchase of it in 1546. During the 17th century they built Tintinhull House as a Dower House.

In 2009 the house was put up for sale with an asking price of around £2million.

== See also ==
- List of Grade I listed buildings in South Somerset
