= Gorbio (river) =

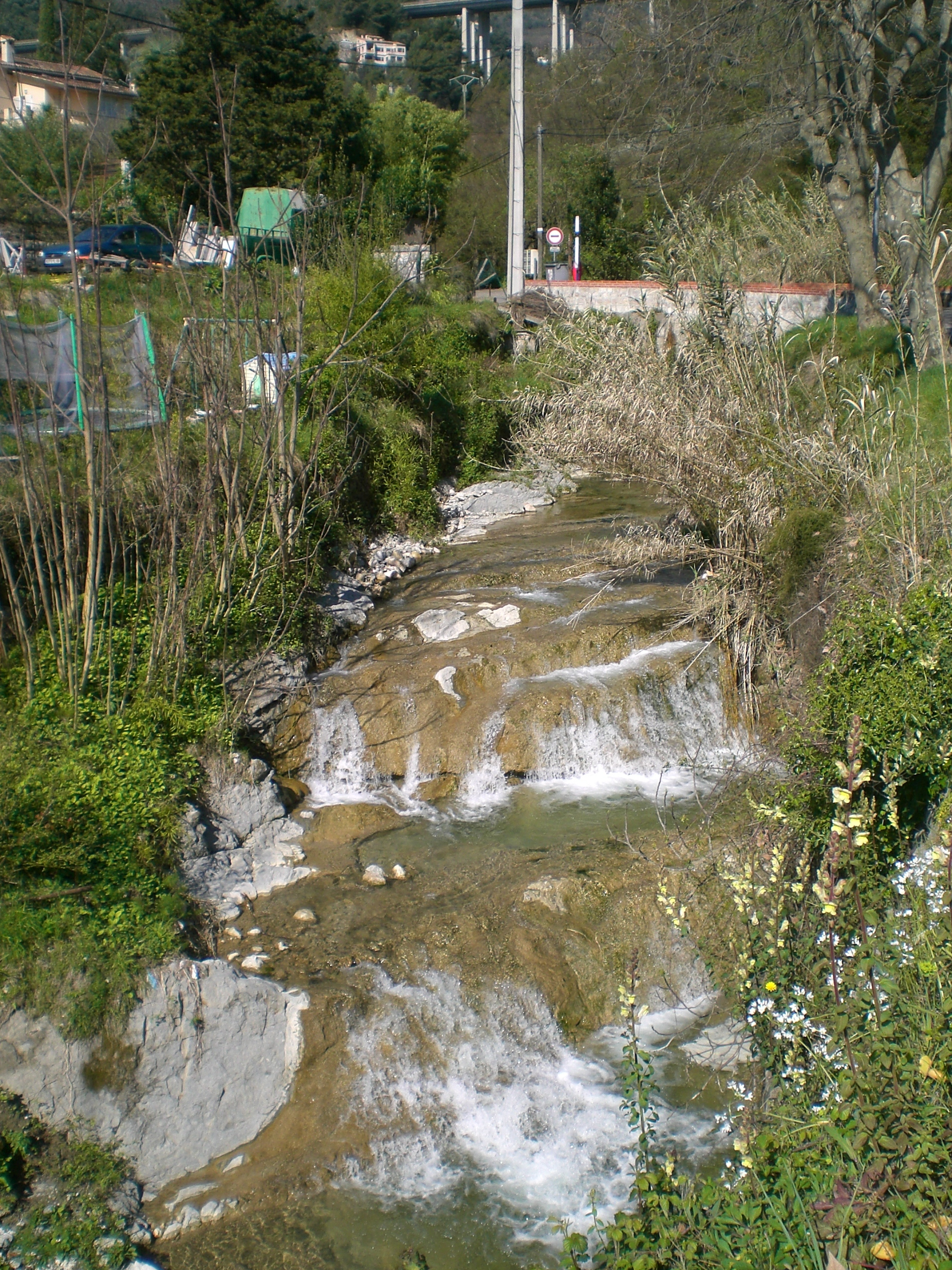

Location
- Country: France

Physical characteristics
- Mouth
  - location: Mediterranean Sea
  - coordinates: 43°45′54″N 7°29′18″E
- Length: 7.7 km (4.8 mi)

The Gorbio is a short river that flows through the Alpes-Maritimes department of southeastern France. It is 7.7 km (4.8 mi) long. Its source is between the small towns Peille and Gorbio. It flows into the Mediterranean Sea at Roquebrune-Cap-Martin.
