= Lawrence W. Johnston =

British garden designer and plantsman

Lawrence Johnston
- Born: Lawrence Waterbury Johnston; 12 October 1871; Paris, France
- Died: 27 April 1958 (aged 86); Serre de la Madone, Menton, France
- Known for: Garden designer, plantsman

Major Lawrence Waterbury Johnston (12 October 1871 – 27 April 1958) was a British garden designer and plantsman. He was the owner and designer of two influential gardens – Hidcote Manor Garden in Britain and Jardin Serre de la Madone in France.

== Biography ==
Lawrence Waterbury Johnston was born on 12 October 1871 in Paris, France, into a family of wealthy American East Coast stockbrokers from Baltimore. He was educated at home, and from 1893 in Britain at the University of Cambridge (Trinity College).

In January 1900, not long after his graduation, he became a naturalised British subject, and he immediately joined the Imperial Yeomanry. In February he was posted to South Africa, where he fought in the Second Boer War. He was commissioned in 1901. It was at this time that he developed his interest in South African flora. The Royal Horticultural Society elected him as a fellow in 1904.

In 1907 Johnston's mother (now Mrs. Winthrop) bought Hidcote Manor, an estate of some 300 acres, near Hidcote Bartram, in Britain; and Johnston began a programme of 40 years' work on its gardens. Here he combined a feeling for structure (creating a surprising series of discrete spaces) with a love of plants and a willingness to experiment with novel plant combinations. An enthusiastic plant collector, he sponsored or undertook several expeditions in Europe, Asia, Africa and South America to bring back rare specimens. In 1922 he went plant-hunting in the alps with Edward Augustus Bowles; and in 1923 sponsored W. T. Goethe on a plant-hunting expedition to the Andes.

He was a close friend of socialite garden designer Norah Lindsay, whose home was nearby in Sutton Courtenay Manor, Oxfordshire.

In 1924 Johnston bought Serre de la Madone, near Menton, on the Mediterranean coast of France; and from then on would spend most of the year at Menton and a few summer months at Hidcote. At Serre de la Madone he turned terraces of vines and olives into a garden bright with drifts of agapanthus and strelitzia.

From 1945 Johnston spent more time at Serre de la Madone, and in 1948 the National Trust acquired Hidcote.

Johnston died on 27 April 1958. He is buried next to his mother in the churchyard at Mickleton, near Hidcote. He left his garden at Serre de la Madone to Nancy Lindsay, the daughter of Norah Lindsay.
