= Montacute Priory =

Priory in Somerset, England

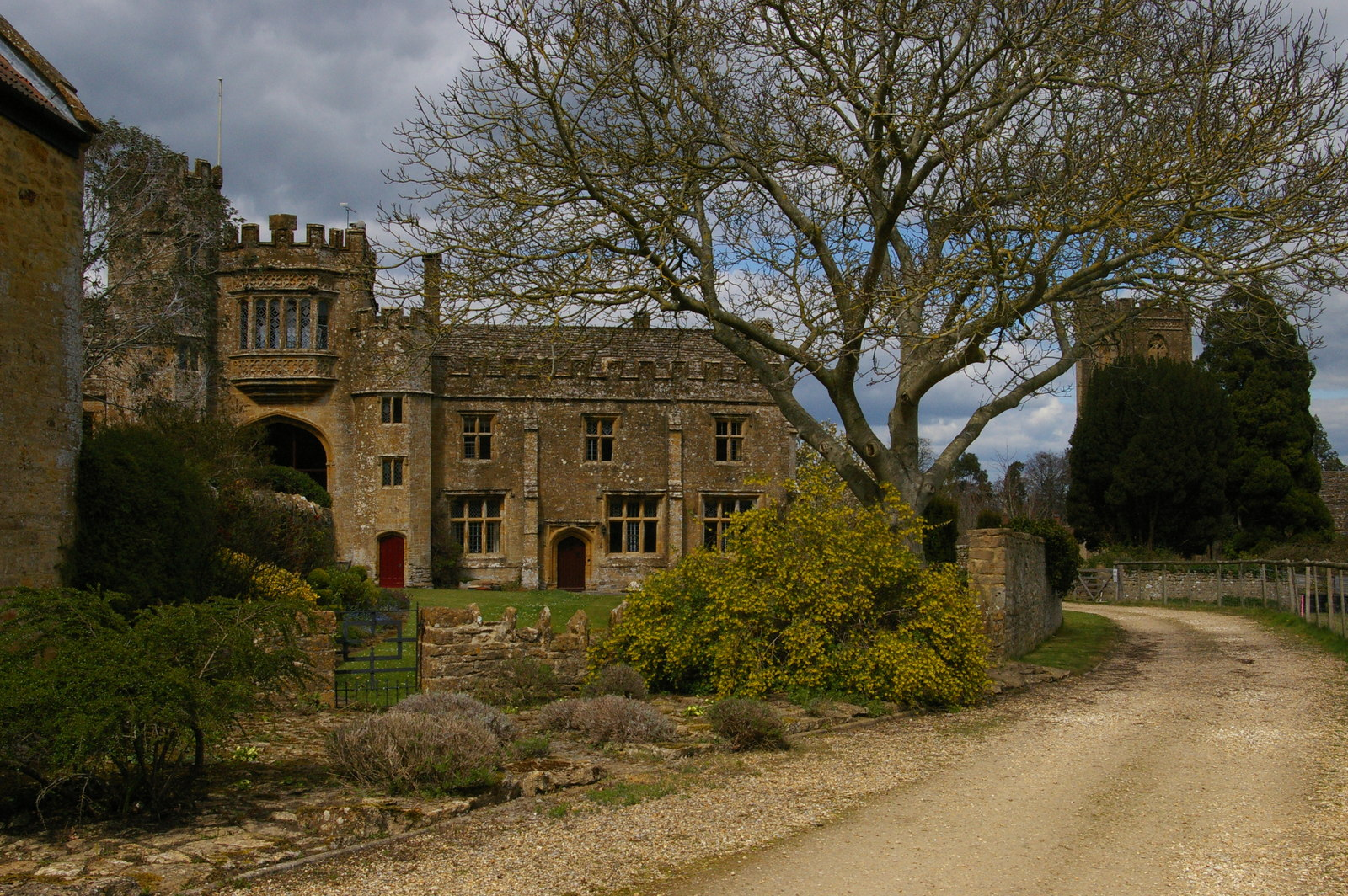
- The gatehouse
- Interactive map of Montacute Priory

Monastery information
- Order: Cluniac
- Established: c. 1078
- Disestablished: 1539

Site
- Location: Montacute, Somerset, England
- Coordinates: 50°56′56″N 02°43′03″W
- Grid reference: grid reference ST497167

Montacute Priory was a Cluniac priory of the Benedictine order in Montacute, Somerset, England.

== History ==
It was founded between 1078 and 1102 by William, Count of Mortain, in face of a threat that if he did not do so, the King would take the land from him. It was the only Somerset dependency of Cluny Abbey until 1407, when it gained independence from France. It was dissolved in 1539, though there was a short restoration under the Catholic Queen Mary.

At its height in 1262 there were 25 monks. In 1539 there were a Prior and 16 monks.

At the time of the Domesday Book in 1086 there were five manors in Mudford. The largest of them, which was given with the church to Montacute Priory in 1192, became Mudford Monachorum (Mudford of the monks) and was centred on the present hamlet of Up Mudford. The Church of St Mary in the village was granted by Montacute Priory to the Bishop of Bath and Wells in 1339.

The Church of St Michael in Creech St Michael came into the ownership of Montacute Priory in 1362.

At one time Tintinhull Court was amongst the possessions of the Priory, along with land in the village.

The priory had a dependent cell at Kerswell Priory near Cullompton, Devon, with land and property in Sampford Peverell and Holcombe Rogus

== Remains ==
All that remains is the Abbey Farmhouse which incorporates the gateway of Montacute Priory. It was built in the 16th century and has been designated as a Grade I listed building. After the dissolution of the monasteries the property became a farmhouse, but by 1633 it was 'almost desolate'. By 1782 it was a revitalised farm, remaining part of the Phelips estate until 1918. The only other surviving building remains are the earthworks, about 90 metres east south east of Abbey Farmhouse. These may be the claustral range, and include the fishpond.

== See also ==
- Montacute House
