= Hidcote Manor Garden =

Historic garden in Hidcote Bartrim, Gloucestershire, England

Coordinates: 52.084560°N 1.746092°W

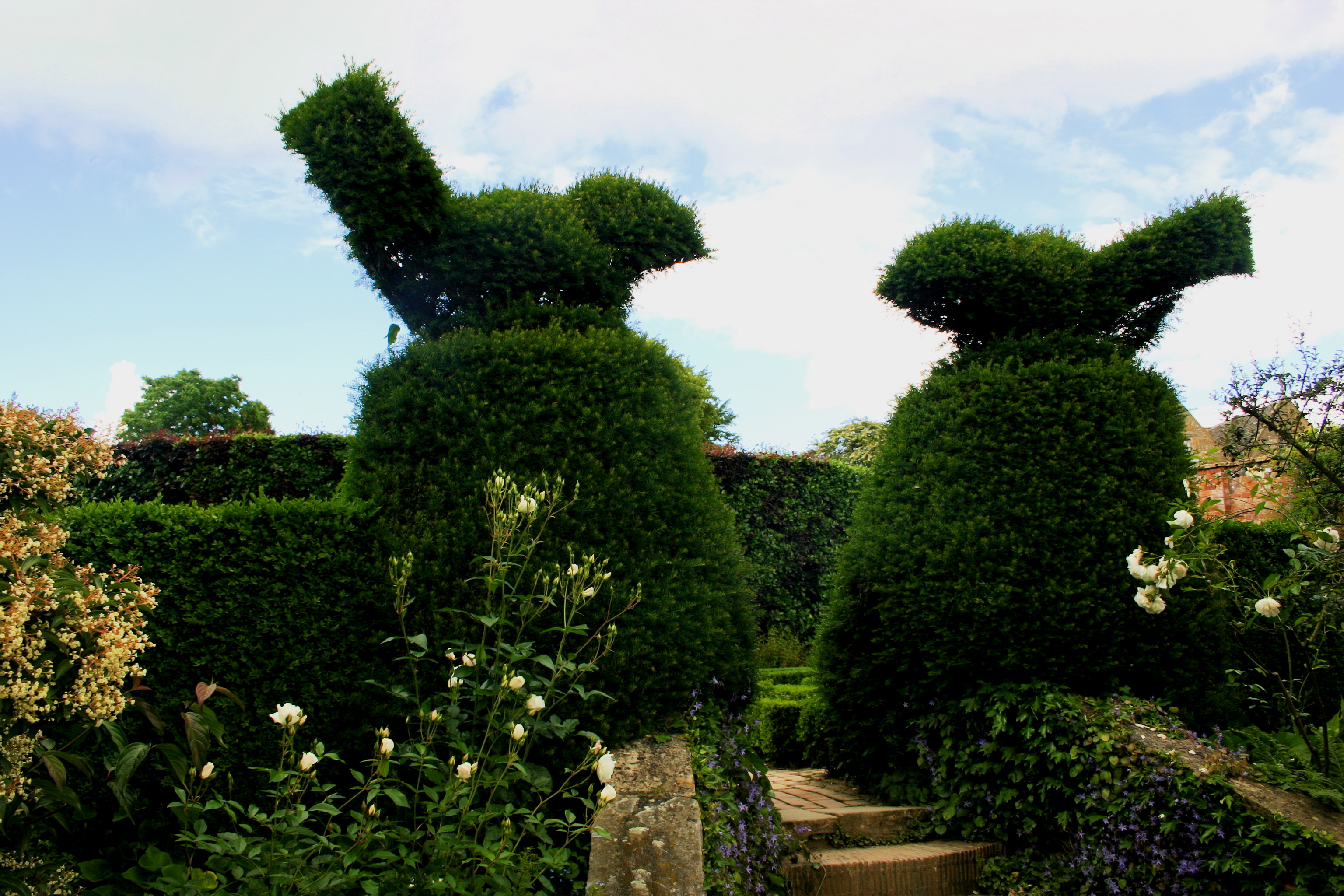
Topiary birds at Hidcote Manor

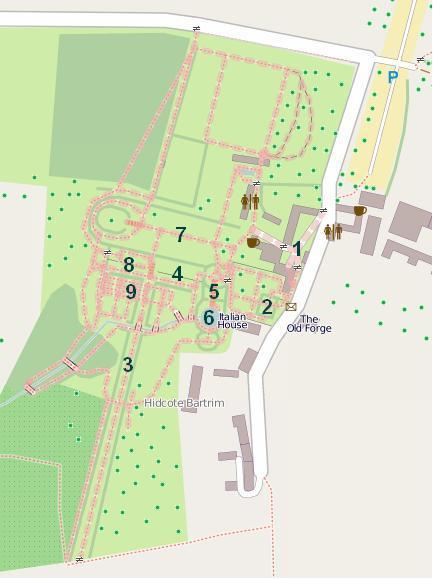
Plan of the garden. 1 Entrance, 2 White Garden, 3 Long Walk, 4 Red Borders, 5 Fuchsia Garden, 6 Bathing Pool Garden, 7 Theatre Lawn, 8 Stilt Garden, 9 Pillar Garden.

Hidcote Manor Garden is a garden in the United Kingdom, located at the village of Hidcote Bartrim, near Chipping Campden, Gloucestershire. It is one of the best-known and most influential Arts and Crafts gardens in Britain, with its linked "garden rooms" of hedges, rare trees, shrubs and herbaceous borders. Created by Lawrence Johnston, it is owned by the National Trust and is open to the public.

== History ==
The Americans, Lawrence Johnston and his mother, settled in Britain about 1900, and Lawrence immediately became a British citizen and fought in the British Army during the Boer war. In 1907 Johnston's mother, Mrs Gertrude Winthrop (she had re-married), purchased the Hidcote Manor Estate. It was situated in a part of Britain with strong connections to the then-burgeoning Arts and Crafts movement and an Anglicized American artistic expatriate community centred nearby at Broadway, Worcestershire.

Johnston soon became interested in turning the fields around the house into a garden. In 1907 he began to lay out the key features of the garden. There are no records to show how many gardeners were employed, but they were directly managed by Lawrence. It was only in 1922, when the garden was essentially complete, that Frank Adams arrived at Hidcote from Windsor Castle to act as head gardener.

The garden became a strong influence on the designer Phyllis Reiss who lived nearby in Dowdeswell Manor. She and her husband bought Tintinhull Garden in Somerset in 1933 so that they could have their own gardens based on the Hidcote Manor style.

After World War II Johnston spent most of his time at Jardin Serre de la Madone, his garden in the south of France; and in 1948 he entrusted Hidcote to the National Trust.

The style of the garden has been widely imitated. In 2007 a temporary garden designed by Chris Beardshaw that drew inspiration from Johnson's Hidcote was constructed at the Chelsea Flower Show in London.

== Character of Hidcote garden ==
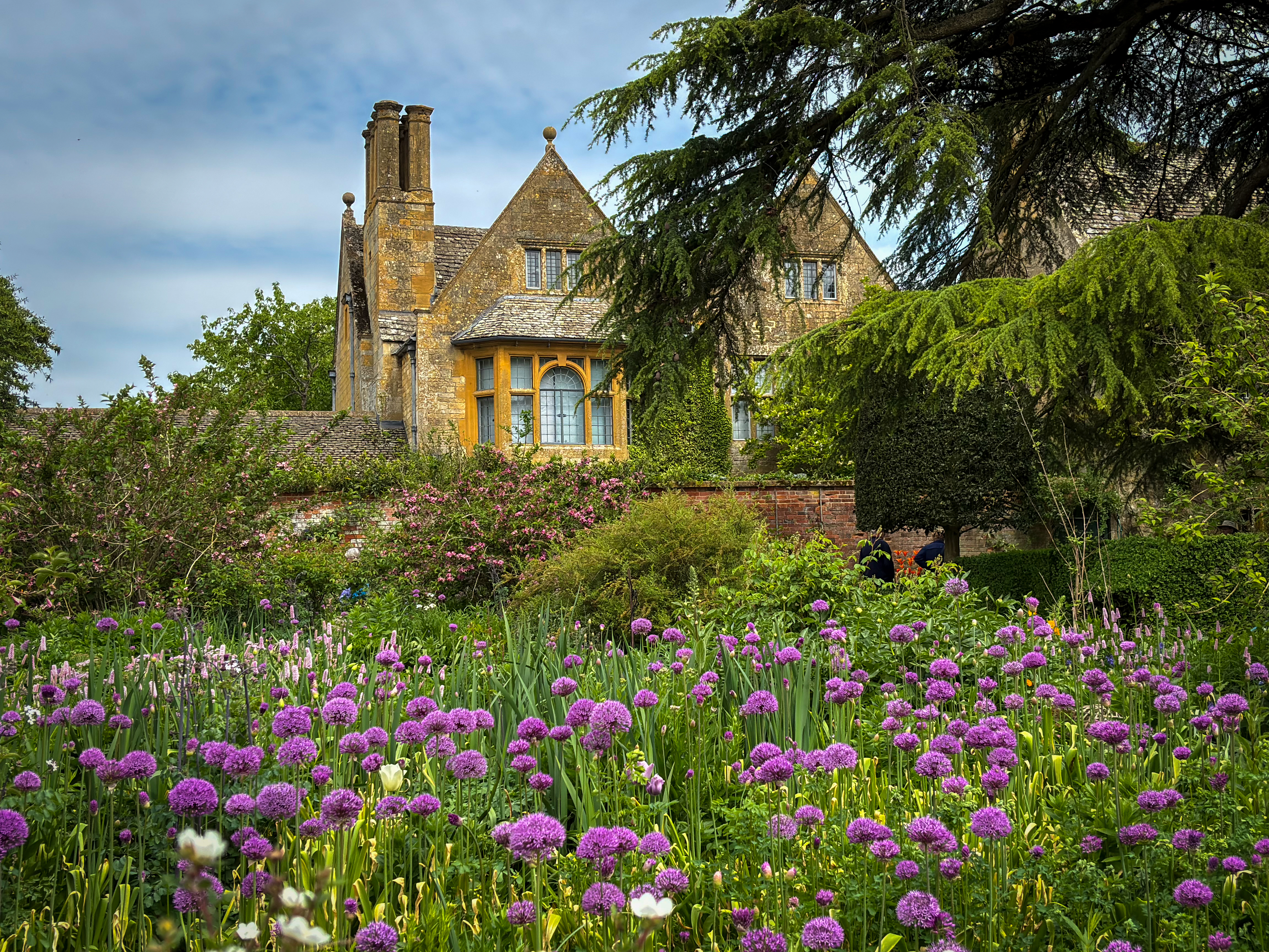
The Old Garden

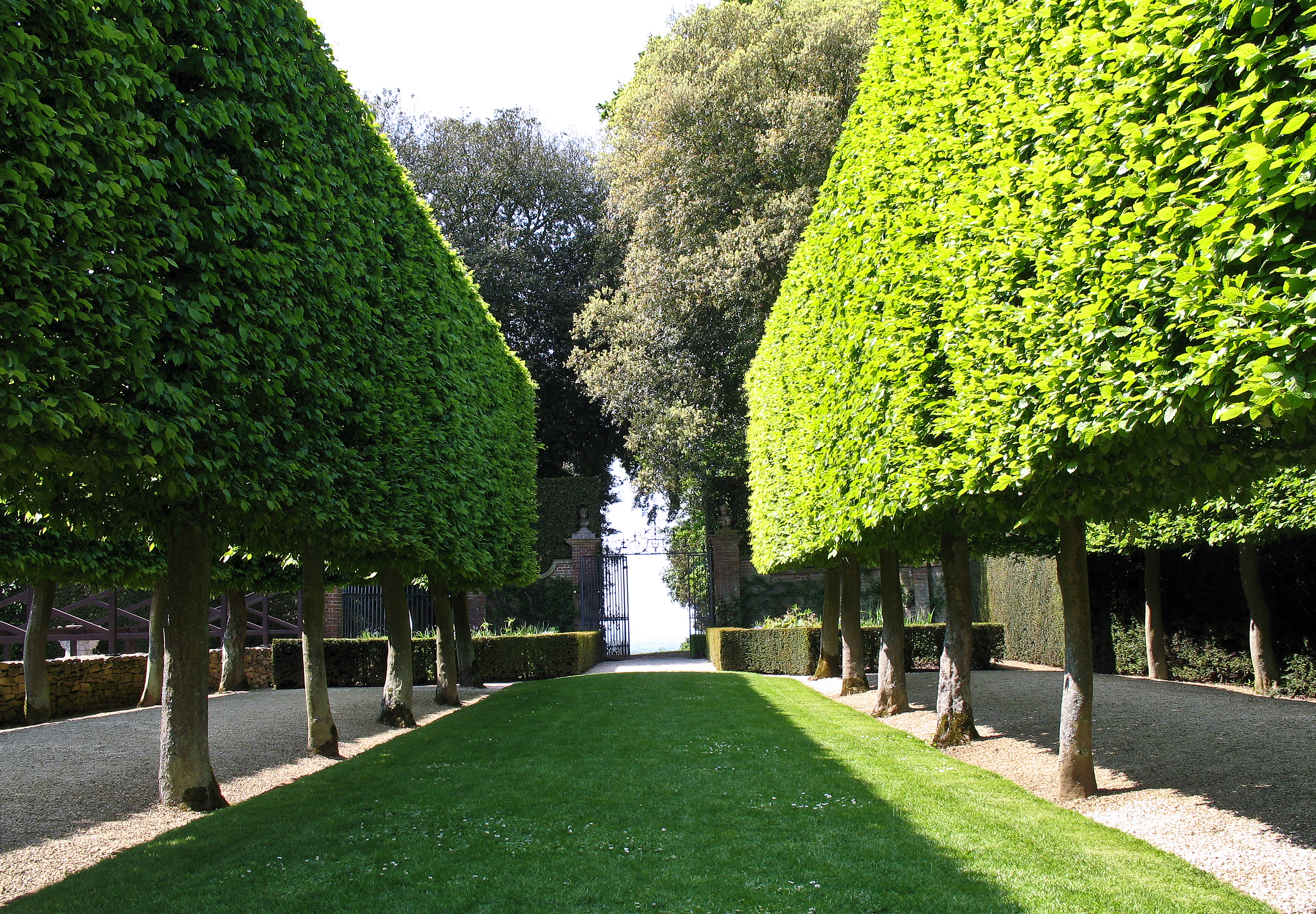
Avenue to gate

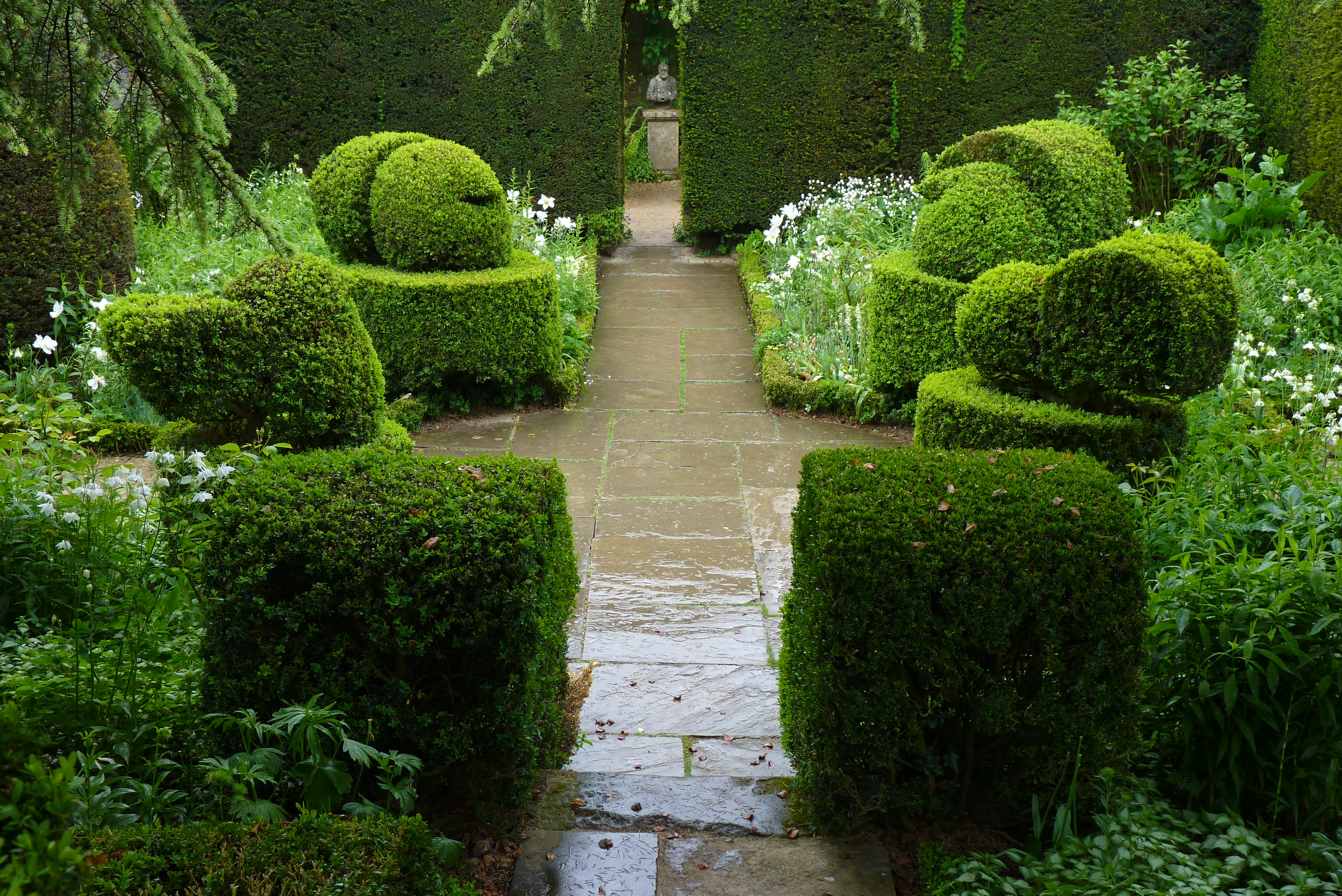
White garden

Lawrence Johnston was influenced in creating his garden at Hidcote by the work of Alfred Parsons and Gertrude Jekyll, who were designing gardens of hardy plants contained within sequences of outdoor "garden rooms". The theme was in the air: Vita Sackville-West and Harold Nicolson's Sissinghurst Castle Garden was laid out as a sequence of such spaces, without, it seems, direct connection with the reclusive and shy Major Johnston. Hidcote's outdoor "rooms" have various characters and themes, achieved by the use of box hedges, hornbeam and yew, and stone walls. These rooms, such as the 'White Garden' and 'Fuchsia Garden' are linked, some by vistas, and furnished with topiaries. Some have ponds and fountains, and all are planted with flowers in bedding schemes. They surround the 17th century manor house, and there are a number of outhouses and a kitchen garden.

Johnston's care in selecting the best plants is reflected in the narrow-leaved lavender, Lavandula angustifolia 'Hidcote', in the Penstemon 'Hidcote Pink' and in the hybrid Hypericum 'Hidcote Gold', acclaimed as the finest hardy St John's Wort, Alice Coats records.

== See also ==
- History of gardening
- Kiftsgate Court Gardens
