= What a Farmwife Painted, 1940 =

Exhibition of paintings by Grandma Moses

What a Farmwife Painted was the first solo exhibition of works by Grandma Moses at the Galerie St. Etienne in October 1940.

Moses’ first exhibition had taken place the previous year with three paintings in the exhibition "Contemporary Unknown American Painters", at the Museum of Modern Art in New York in 1939. The interest generated there led to these three paintings The First Automobile, Home, and In the Maple Sugar Days being included in her first solo exhibition "What a Farmwife Painted" at the Galerie St. Etienne. It was organized by Louis J. Caldor and Otto Kallir and was a success, although Kallir felt the exhibition "included many of her early attempts in which her great talent was scarcely recognizable."

The list of 35 paintings included were referenced with numbers 1-34, taken from an old exhibition handout, in his 1976 catalogue raisonné by Otto Kallir:

title	1940 exhibition nr.	1973 Kallir nr.	latest date painted	collection / owner
Down in the Glen	1	23	1940	Louis J. Caldor
Where the Muddy Missouri Rolls	2	47	1940	Louis J. Caldor
A Winter Sleigh Ride	3	74	1940	Louis J. Caldor
Farm Along the River	4	21	1940	Louis J. Caldor
Village in Winter	5	71	1940	Louis J. Caldor
The Covered Wagon	6	17	1940	Louis J. Caldor
Back Yard at Home	7	7	1940	Louis J. Caldor
Starry Eyes (painted on tin)	8	53	1940	
All Dressed Up for Sunday	9	3	1940	Louis J. Caldor
The Guardian Angel	10	29	1940	Louis J. Caldor
Hills of New England	11	48	1940	Mrs. Ian McDonald
Bridge	12	10	1940	Louis J. Caldor
The Burning of Troy	13	62	1939	Louis J. Caldor
Home from the Honeymoon	14	35	1940	Louis J. Caldor
Bringing in the Hay	15	30	1940	Louis J. Caldor
The Old House at the Bend in the Road	16	40	1940	Louis J. Caldor; Bennington Museum (1995.13)
A Fire in the Woods	17	22	1940	Louis J. Caldor
Sugar House among the Trees	18	55	1940	Harold L. Downey
Bringing in the Maple Sugar	19	42	1939	Otto Kallir
Shenandoah Valley, South Branch	20	51	1938	Louis J. Caldor
Home	21	31	1939	Louis J. Caldor
In the Maple Sugar Days	22	43	1939	Louis J. Caldor; Mr. & Mrs. Henry Matalene Jr.
The First Automobile	23	6	1939	Louis J. Caldor
Shenandoah Valley (1861 News of the Battle)	24	52	1938	Louis J. Caldor
Cambridge in the Valley	25	11	1940	Louis J. Caldor
Turkey in the Straw	26	63	1940	Mr. and Mrs. Joseph Kelly Vodrey
On the Road to Greenwich (two sided painting)	27A	26	1940	Louis J. Caldor
The Waterfalls (other side of two sided painting)	27B	72	1940	Louis J. Caldor
Home for Thanksgiving	28	34	1940	Louis J. Caldor
The Old Churchyard on Sunday Morning	29	15	1940	Louis J. Caldor
Apple Pickers	30	5	1940	Louis J. Caldor
At the Old Well	31	73	1940	Louis J. Caldor
The Village by the Brookside	32	70	1940	Louis J. Caldor
September Hills	33	50	1940	
Mt. Nebo on the Hill (embroidery)	34	34W	1940	Louis J. Caldor
