= Sugaring off (disambiguation) =

Sugaring off is part of the process of producing maple syrup. It may also refer to:

- Sugaring Off (Grandma Moses), a 1943 painting by Grandma Moses
- Sugaring Off (Grandma Moses, 442), a 1943 painting by Grandma Moses
- Sugaring Off (French novel), a 2022 novel by Gillian French
- Sugaring Off (Britt novel), a 2024 novel by Fanny Britt
