= The Old Covered Bridge (Grandma Moses) =

Painting by Grandma Moses, c. 1941

- Artist: Grandma Moses
- Year: c. 1941
- Medium: Oil paint, flecks of mica, composition board
- Dimensions: 21.91 cm (8.63 in) × 26.99 cm (10.63 in)
- Location: Wadsworth Atheneum
- Owner: Jane Perry Clark Carey
- Accession no.: 1957.609

The Old Covered Bridge is a c. 1941 oil painting by the American outsider painter Grandma Moses, produced at age 81 and signed "Moses". It has been in the collection of the Wadsworth Atheneum since 1957.

It shows the artist's impression of a horse-drawn sleigh coming through a covered bridge, with the flecks of mica spread on the snow to heighten the whiteness of the winter landscape. This painting is a good example of the early small format winter landscapes that the artist sold along with her preserves at local fairs in the period before she became famous and began producing larger pictures. Though this painting was made too early to be included in her record book, page 18 in that book representing sales for the year 1943 showed that she priced her paintings by size: "a picture measuring 6 1/4 by 8 inches is listed as having been sold for $2; one measuring 11 1/2 by 13 3/4 inches brought $5; and one 23 by 26 3/4 inches brought $15."

== See also ==
- Galerie St. Etienne
