= Sugaring Off (Grandma Moses, 442) =

1943 painting by Grandma Moses

- Artist: Grandma Moses
- Year: 1943
- Catalogue: Otto Kallir, Grandma Moses, 1973, cat nr. 276; Grandma Moses record book nr. 442
- Medium: Oil paint, composition board
- Dimensions: 23 in (58 cm) × 27 in (69 cm)
- Location: Bennington Museum (2020); High Museum of Art (2021); Brandywine Museum of Art (2022)
- Collection: Galerie St. Etienne

Sugaring Off is a 1943 oil painting by the American outsider painter Grandma Moses, produced at age 83 and signed "Moses". It is in the collection of the Galerie St. Etienne.

It shows the artist's impression of maple sugaring traditions, with a cauldron of sap boiling on an open fire in the middle. On the left a woman pours the maple wax into fresh snow for children who are watching. On the right buckets of sap are poured into a large barrel for the next load to boil, while behind that a man with an ox-sled pulls logs presumably to feed the fire. The painting is notable for being the first full color lithograph of a Grandma Moses painting that could be ordered for framing. It was on loan to the Bennington Museum during the 2020 pandemic where a video was published online to museum members at home unable to come in person.

In 1946, this painting was the first of forty selected for her to tell her story in her own words in the book Grandma Moses American Primitive: "In the maple orchards long ago, after the maple sap had been evaporated till it would spin a hair, then a call was sent out to all the young people to come to the waxin', they would pour the thick syrup on dishes of snow for each to eat, they would eat their fill and go home to dream sweet dreams,..."

The next year in 1947, this painting was also selected to become a Christmas card that later became a bestseller for Hallmark Cards. The card was a folded rectangle with the painting on the front, and on the back in small lettering, the text "This reproduction of "Sugaring Off" is from an original painting by Grandma Moses, New England farm wife, who began painting at the age of 76 and is recognized as one of the country's outstanding contemporary artists."

== See also ==
- Galerie St. Etienne
