= The Battle of Bennington (Grandma Moses) =

1953 painting by Grandma Moses

- Artist: Grandma Moses
- Year: 1953
- Medium: Oil paint, pressed wood
- Dimensions: 18 in (46 cm) × 30 in (76 cm)
- Accession no.: 2014.4

The Battle of Bennington is a 1953 oil painting by the American outsider painter Grandma Moses, produced at age 93 and signed "Moses". It has been in the collection of the Bennington Museum since 2014.

It shows the artist's impression of The Battle of Bennington, with the central portion being a map of the various positions of the participants in the fight itself. To the right behind the mountain is the Bennington Battle Monument, which is impossibly reflected in the Hoosic river, which winds around on the side of the battlefield and flows beneath her beloved covered bridge of Cambridge. The winding river and the shadow of the monument suggest the artist's intent to connect the events of the battle with larger activities involved in the Saratoga campaign. Originally commissioned by the Daughters of the American Revolution in 1953, it was rejected for having the modern monument included. In typical Grandma Moses fashion, she did not retouch the painting but obligingly painted another one, which was accepted and most recently put on show and featured in the 2012 "By, For, and Of the People: Folk Art and Americana" exhibition of the DAR Museum.

This painting is one of five Bennington-related paintings that Grandma Moses made, three of which are in the Bennington collection.

== See also ==
- Galerie St. Etienne
- Bennington, a 1953 painting of the town of Bennington by Grandma Moses in the Bennington Museum, featuring a relocation of the monument next to the museum itself.
