= Wagon Repair Shop (Grandma Moses) =

1960 painting by Grandma Moses

- Artist: Grandma Moses
- Year: 1960
- Medium: Oil paint, composition board
- Location: Bennington Museum
- Accession no.: 2003.134

Wagon Repair Shop is a 1960 oil painting by the American outsider painter Grandma Moses, produced at age 100 and signed "Moses". It has been in the collection of the Bennington Museum since 2003.

It shows a scene of the artist's impression of a wagon workshop, with figures watering, shoeing, and feeding the horses. Beyond the mountains above Cambridge valley can be seen with a hay wagon passing on a road. This painting was used to create a mural in Hoosick Falls, New York.

== See also ==
- Galerie St. Etienne
