= Bennington (Grandma Moses) =

1953 painting by Grandma Moses

- Artist: Grandma Moses
- Year: 1953
- Medium: Oil paint, composition board
- Dimensions: 18 in (46 cm) × 24 in (61 cm)
- Accession no.: 1986.347

Bennington is a 1953 oil painting by the American outsider painter Grandma Moses, produced at age 93 and signed "Moses". It has been in the collection of the Bennington Museum since 1986.

It shows the artist's impression of Bennington, Vermont, with the central gray stone building that currently houses the Bennington Museum itself. To the right is the Bennington Battle Monument, which in real life is much further away. The battle monument was financed in 1877, built in the 1880s, completed in 1889, and dedicated in 1891 to commemorate the Battle of Bennington centennial. The monument and its story were personal for Grandma Moses who lived close by for many years and whose great-grandfather, Archibald Robertson, had been a soldier in the battle. This painting is one of five of Bennington that Grandma Moses painted, three of which are in the Bennington collection.

== See also ==
- Galerie St. Etienne
- Bennington Museum
- The Battle of Bennington, a 1953 painting of the Battle of Bennington by Grandma Moses in the Bennington Museum, featuring the tall point of the monument like a church steeple overshadowing the battle itself.
