= Great Fire (The Burning of Troy in 1862) =

1959 painting by Grandma Moses

- Artist: Grandma Moses
- Year: 1959
- Medium: Oil paint, pressed wood
- Dimensions: 12.25 in (31.1 cm) × 16.5 in (42 cm)
- Accession: 2024.3

Great Fire (The Burning of Troy in 1862) is a 1959 oil painting by the American outsider painter Grandma Moses, produced at age 99 and signed "Moses". It has been in the collection of the Bennington Museum since 2024.

It shows the artist's impression of the covered bridge of Troy, New York, from the western Green Island entry point on 10 May 1862, looking east at the moment that a spark from a locomotive set the bridge over the Hudson River on fire. To the right is a peaceful scene of Troy that mostly burned later that evening, thanks to the westerly wind pushing the flames towards the center of town. The fire was a major disaster for the town that had recently become a major hub for traffic on the Rensselaer and Saratoga Railroad line going east across the Hudson as well as steamships travelling north and south along the Hudson. Grandma Moses was born two years before it happened, but in a town bordering the Hudson river further upstate in Greenwich, N.Y. She would have heard the stories of river folk, locals and family members about the devastation caused by it.

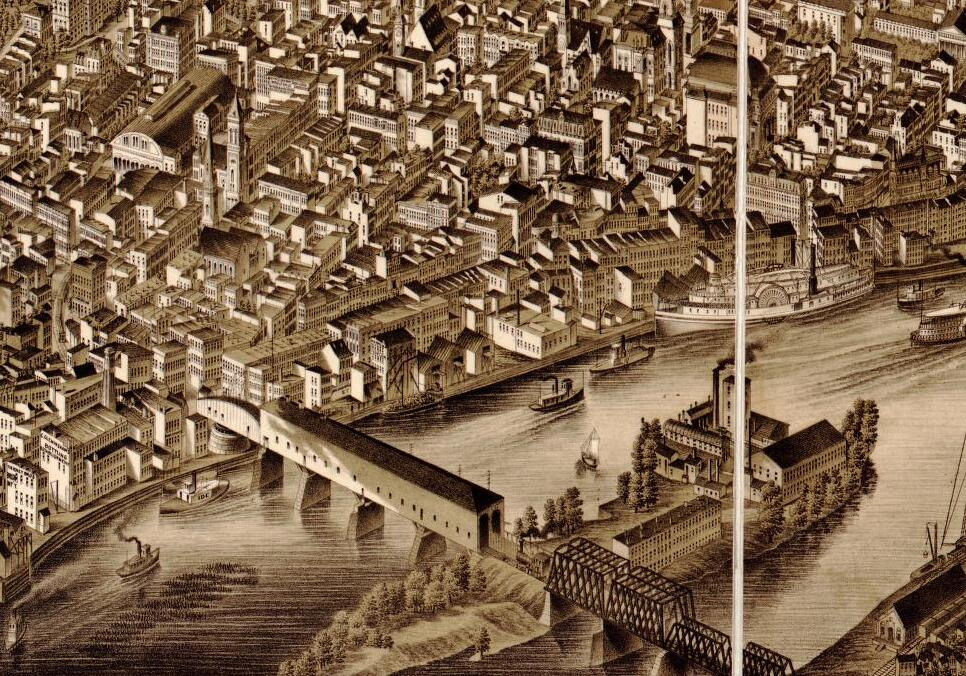
Detail of 1881 bird's eye view of Troy, with the rebuilt Green Island Bridge (portion from Centre Island to Troy was still covered with a wooden shed until a new bridge was built in 1884)

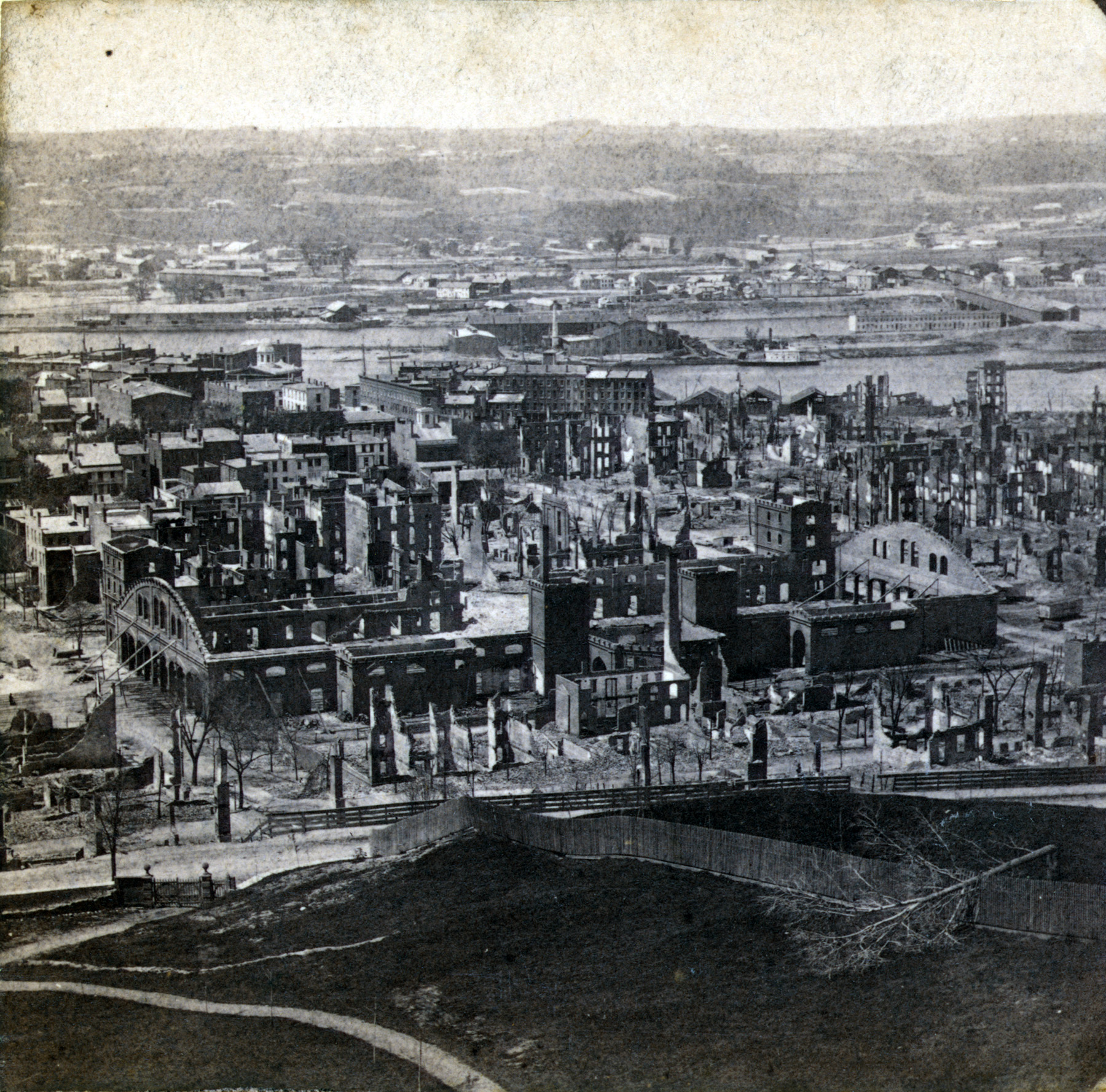
Photo of the burnt district surrounding Union Station in Troy, looking west towards the river, with upper right the remaining part of the Green Island Bridge connecting Green Island to Centre Island

Regular memorials were held for the Great Fire of Troy on anniversary days, such as in 2012 for the 150th year. In 1937, the 75th anniversary had been commemorated with various activities, and a news article printed in 1939 with a dramatic oval graphic illustrating the bridge on fire caught the eye of the artist, who cut the clipping and marked it up for her use in a rectangular painting. Her first version based on the print was included in her first solo exhibition in 1940 at the Galerie St. Etienne in NYC. She then made two more versions in 1941 that expanded the scene to include the soon-to-be-burned Troy side of the river. These must have been well-received, because she made two more versions in 1942 and 1943 that included more of the town. This 1959 painting is the last known version. None are the same, but all six contain the same central burning bridge idea.

== See also ==
- Galerie St. Etienne
