= My Hills of Home (Grandma Moses) =

1941 painting by Grandma Moses

- Artist: Grandma Moses
- Year: 1941
- Medium: Oil paint, composition board
- Dimensions: 18 in (46 cm) × 36 in (91 cm)
- Owner: Fred E. Robertson
- Accession no.: 1953.3

My Hills of Home is a 1941 oil painting by the American outsider painter Grandma Moses, produced at age 81 and signed "Moses". It has been in the collection of the Memorial Art Gallery since 1953.

It shows the artist's impression of her home in Eagle Bridge, New York, with the hills of Hoosick Valley around it. The unusually wide painting was in her brother's possession, who himself made a painting with similar dimensions and the same title re-interpreting the scene in Spring green with sharper contours for the surrounding hills. Fred E. Robertson was a farmer who also painted in his spare time, and like his sister he even had a show in New York at Galerie St. Etienne.

== See also ==
- Galerie St. Etienne
