= The Departure (Grandma Moses) =

1951 painting by Grandma Moses

- Artist: Grandma Moses
- Year: 1951
- Medium: Oil paint, wood
- Dimensions: 43.2 cm (17.0 in) × 55.9 cm (22.0 in)
- Location: Philadelphia Art Museum
- Accession no.: 2009-125-1

The Departure is a 1951 oil painting by the American outsider painter Grandma Moses, produced at age 91 and signed "Moses". It is now in the Philadelphia Museum of Art, whose collections it entered in 2009.

It shows an unusual theme of a large group of people, set in a typical Moses winter snow setting. The figures are ambiguous in relation to the title. The train could be arriving or departing, and the people could be arriving or departing.

The painting was donated by the Kallir Family Foundation in 2009 in memory of Anne d'Harnoncourt, the modern art expert and CEO of the museum who died suddenly in 2008. It featured as the most recent donation in the 2013 exhibition First Look: Collecting for Philadelphia, where other paintings had been donated for the same reason.

== See also ==
- Galerie St. Etienne
