= The Old Oaken Bucket (Grandma Moses) =

1945 painting by Grandma Moses

- Artist: Grandma Moses
- Year: 1945
- Medium: Oil paint, fiberboard
- Owner: Charles K. Feldman, Unknown
- Accession: 74.229

The Old Oaken Bucket is a 1945 oil painting by the American outsider painter Grandma Moses, produced at age 85 and signed "Moses". It has been in the collection of the Hirshhorn Museum and Sculpture Garden since 1974.

It shows a scene of the artist's interpretation of Samuel Woodworth's poem The Old Oaken Bucket, set in a typical Moses summer setting. The topic had become a bestseller for the artist since she won the New York State Prize for an earlier version in 1941. According to Otto Kallir's 1973 catalogue raisonné she made 11 versions in 1943 and 5 in 1944. In 1947 she titled another version The Old Oaken Bucket, The Last, but the last one Kallir listed was dated 1952.

This painting was on a long-term loan to the White House from 12 May 1975 until January 1977 during the Ford presidency.

== See also ==
- Galerie St. Etienne
- The Old Oaken Bucket, The Last
