= Thanksgiving Turkey (Grandma Moses) =

1943 painting by Grandma Moses

- Artist: Grandma Moses
- Year: 1943
- Medium: Oil paint, wood
- Dimensions: 38.4 cm (15.1 in) × 48.6 cm (19.1 in)
- Location: Metropolitan Museum of Art
- Owner: Mary Stillman Harkness
- Accession no.: 50.145.375
- Identifiers: The Met object ID: 19301

Thanksgiving Turkey is a 1943 oil painting by the American outsider painter Grandma Moses, produced at age 83 and signed "Moses". It has been in the collection of the Metropolitan Museum of Art since 1950.

It shows a scene of the artist's impression of catching a Thanksgiving turkey, a subject she returned to many times in her career as an artist of "old timey" subjects. It was often in demand as a variation on her popular theme of "over the river to grandma's house", which was generally a scene of figures in a horse-drawn sleigh crossing a stream. The figures are in the snow by a shed trying to catch a turkey.

== See also ==
- Galerie St. Etienne
