= The Old Checkered House, 1853 =

1946 painting by Grandma Moses

- The Old Checkered House in 1853
- Artist: Grandma Moses
- Year: 1946
- Medium: Opaque watercolor, hardboard
- Dimensions: 35.88 cm (14.13 in) × 53.66 cm (21.13 in)
- Location: Nelson-Atkins Museum of Art
- Owner: J. C. Hall
- Accession no.: 52-14

The Old Checkered House, 1853 is a 1946 oil painting by the American outsider painter Grandma Moses, produced at age 86 and signed "Moses". It has been in the collection of the Nelson-Atkins Museum of Art since 1952.

It shows a scene of the artist's impression of the Checkered House in Cambridge, New York, a landmark dating from the Revolutionary War period. Like the Checkered house version she had painted a few years before, the artist shows her impression of the stage coach with passengers at the spot along Highway 22 where the old house once stood. The painting was donated in 1952 by the man who negotiated the rights to print the first Grandma Moses Christmas cards in 1947, Mr. Joyce Hall, for Hallmark Cards.

== See also ==
- Galerie St. Etienne
