= Hildegard Bachert =

American art dealer (1921–2019)

- Born: April 3, 1921; Mannheim, Germany
- Died: October 17, 2019 (aged 98); Brattleboro, Vermont, U.S.
- Occupation: Art gallery director
- Years active: 1940–2019
- Employer: Galerie St. Etienne

Hildegard Bachert (April 3, 1921 – October 17, 2019) was a German-born American art dealer and gallery director. Born in Mannheim, Germany in 1921, Bachert moved to America in 1936 to seek refuge from the Nazi regime. In 1940, she began working at the Galerie St. Etienne, a Manhattan gallery specializing in Austrian and German expressionist art, where she worked until her death.

== Germany ==
Hildegard Bachert spent her childhood in Mannheim, Germany with her mother, father, and older sister Edith. She was twelve when the Nazis came to power in 1933. Her parents quickly made plans to send Hildegard and her sister to the United States, where they had relatives working in the meat industry. They escorted Edith and Hildegard to the US in 1936, but had to return to Germany soon after. After their return, their family home in Mannheim was plundered during Kristallnacht, but the Bachert parents escaped the country shortly thereafter and rejoined their children in America.

== America and the Galerie St. Etienne ==
Once in the United States, Hildegard enrolled in high school and worked diligently to acquire English fluency. She graduated from high school in 1939 and, soon after, began working at the Nierendorf Gallery in midtown Manhattan. After a year and a half at Nierendorf, Otto Kallir hired her to work as his secretary at the Galerie St. Etienne.

Bachert was instrumental in cultivating the gallery’s relationship with Grandma Moses, the most famous of the American folk artists represented by the Galerie St. Etienne. She collaborated with Moses by taking dictation for, ‘‘My Life’s History,’’ the artist’s autobiography.

Additionally, she specialized in the work of Käthe Kollwitz, a perennial staple at the gallery.

When Otto Kallir died in 1978, Bachert assumed the role of co-director with Jane Kallir, Kallir’s granddaughter. Bachert and Kallir found many ways to make the historical material the Galerie St. Etienne is known for relevant to a contemporary audience. As part of their mission, Bachert authored an essay to the catalogue for the 1992 National Gallery Kollwitz retrospective and coordinated a double exhibition of Kollwitz’ work at the Fondation Neumann and the Musée Jenisch in 1994.

In addition to Moses and Kollwitz, Bachert played a critical role in promoting lesser known artists in the Galerie St. Etienne’s purview like Paula Modersohn-Becker, Richard Gerstl, Lea Grundig, Jeanne Mammen, and Sue Coe. She collaborated with Jane Kallir to complete the 1990 revision to Otto Kallir’s original catalogue raisonné of the work of Egon Schiele.

Bachert and Kallir also maintain the Grandma Moses archives assembled by Otto Kallir in connection with the Grandma Moses catalogue raisonné.

In 1999, Bachert was awarded the Cross of Merit, First Class for outstanding achievement towards rebuilding the Federal Republic of Germany. Bachert celebrated her 75th year of work at the Galerie St. Etienne, where she shared directorial responsibilities with Kallir.

== Publications ==
“Collecting the Art of Käthe Kollwitz,” in Elizabeth Prelinger, ed., Käthe Kollwitz (Washington D.C. and New Haven: Yale University Press, 1992).
