= July Fourth (Grandma Moses) =

1951 painting by Grandma Moses

- Artist: Grandma Moses
- Medium: oil on masonite
- Dimensions: 61 cm × 90 cm (24 in × 35 in)
- Location: White House, Washington, D.C.

July Fourth is a 1951 oil painting by the American outsider painter Grandma Moses, produced at age 91 and signed "Moses". It is now in the White House, whose collections it entered in 1952.

It shows a summer scene of people celebrating Independence Day, set in a typical Moses green summer setting. The figures are taking part in a parade, a picnic, a revolutionary war re-enactment, and a game of baseball. The horse-drawn buggies show it's meant as a scene from the artist's childhood. The painting was given as a gift to Harry S. Truman for the White House collection in 1952, where it continues to hang today. In 1969, it was selected as the basis for a commemorative 6 cent stamp.

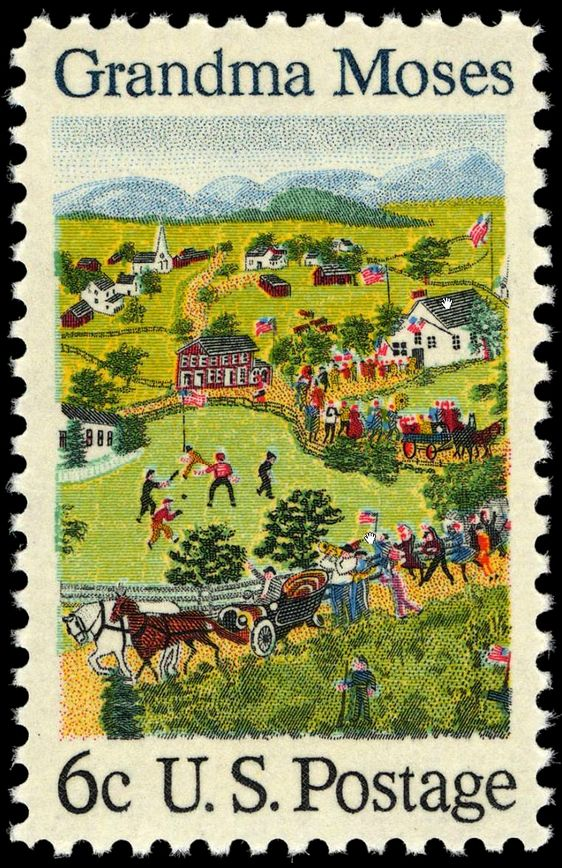
6 cent stamp showing the center-right portion of the painting

== See also ==
- Galerie St. Etienne
