= Country Fair (Grandma Moses) =

1950 painting by Grandma Moses

- Artist: Grandma Moses
- Medium: oil on canvas
- Dimensions: 88.9 cm × 114.3 cm (35.0 in × 45.0 in)
- Location: private collection

Country Fair is a 1950 oil painting by the American outsider painter Grandma Moses, produced at age 89 and signed "Moses". It was sold at Sotheby's in 2009 for US$1,082,500.

It shows a scene of the artist's impression of a country fair, set in a typical Moses summer setting. The figures are coming and going in all manner of horse-drawn vehicles and taking part in various activities such as horse and cattle judging, buggy racing, and eating in a temporary festival tent. The central figure is a balloon man. It was one of the last large paintings she painted.

== See also ==
- Galerie St. Etienne
