= Checkered House (Grandma Moses) =

1943 painting by Grandma Moses

- Artist: Grandma Moses
- Year: 1943
- Medium: oil on canvas
- Dimensions: 91.4 cm × 114.3 cm (36.0 in × 45.0 in)
- Location: private collection

Checkered House is a 1943 oil painting by the American outsider painter Grandma Moses, produced at age 83 and signed "Moses". It was sold at Sotheby's in 2016.

It shows a scene of the artist's impression of the Checkered House in Cambridge, New York, a landmark dating from the Revolutionary War period. The figures in period costume are coming and going by horseback. It was a recurring theme she painted, remarking “The Checkered House is old... It was the Headquarters of General Baum in the revolution war, and afterwards he used it as a Hospital, then it was a stopping place for the stage, where they changed horses every two miles."'

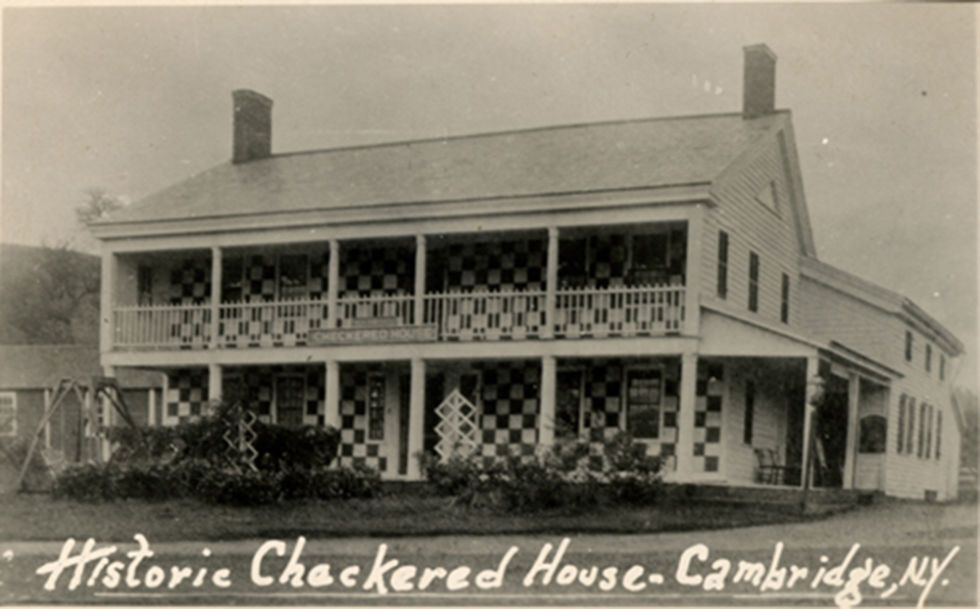
Old postcard of the Checkered House in Cambridge, NY, painted with checkers in 1853 and burned 7 February 1907

This painting was a newer version of one of three sent by the artist to an exhibition in May 1941 in the Syracuse Museum of Art (today the Everson Museum of Art). One was awarded a prize and purchased by Thomas J. Watson, and this one was probably also later purchased by him, for it hung in the IBM headquarters in Armonk, New York for many years.

== See also ==
- The Old Checkered House, 1853
- Galerie St. Etienne
