= White Christmas (Grandma Moses) =

1954 painting by Grandma Moses

- Artist: Grandma Moses
- Year: 1954
- Medium: Oil paint, composition board
- Dimensions: 23.75 in (60.3 cm) × 19.75 in (50.2 cm)
- Owner: Irving Berlin

White Christmas is a 1954 oil painting by the American outsider painter Grandma Moses, produced at age 94 and signed "Moses". It was in the collection of Irving Berlin.

It shows the artist's impression of an idealized white snowy Christmas, with children playing in the snow and ice-skating on a pond, horse-drawn sleighs on the roads, and a man dragging a pine tree towards a house. Grandma Moses was a fan of popular holiday songs and she possibly made this painting with the song "White Christmas" in mind. It's a rare example from her oeuvre of a painting taller than it is wide. She apparently ignored a proposal to depart from her horizontal landscape format in order to produce magazine covers. This one was used as a book cover in 2008.

== See also ==
- Galerie St. Etienne
