= A Fire in the Woods (Grandma Moses) =

1947 painting by Grandma Moses

- Artist: Grandma Moses
- Year: 1947
- Medium: Oil paint, board
- Dimensions: 61 cm (24 in) × 92.1 cm (36.3 in)
- Location: National Gallery of Art
- Owner: Ala Story, Margaret Mallory
- Accession no.: 1999.81.1

A Fire in the Woods is a 1947 oil painting by the American outsider painter Grandma Moses, produced at age 87 and signed "Moses". It has been in the collection of the National Gallery of Art since 1999.

It shows a scene of the artist's impression of a forest fire, with figures rushing towards the scene as well as watching.

== See also ==
- Galerie St. Etienne
