= Edith Kallir =

- Born: June 15, 1915
- Died: September 2, 1982 (aged 67)
- Occupations: Photographer and teacher

Edith Haber, also known by her married name Edith Kallir, (June 15, 1915 – September 2, 1982) was an Austrian-born American photographer and teacher. She is best known for her photographs of Grandma Moses which she was commissioned to take in 1940. These became well known around the world in a series of publications in 1950s illustrated magazines. Her husband Wilhelm Kallir was a relative of the art historian Otto Kallir. Otto was an important collector of Grandma Moses's paintings.
