= The Old Oaken Bucket, The Last =

1947 painting by Grandma Moses

- Artist: Grandma Moses
- Medium: oil on masonite
- Dimensions: 91.4 cm × 121.9 cm (36.0 in × 48.0 in)
- Location: private collection

The Old Oaken Bucket, The Last is a 1947 oil painting by the American outsider painter Grandma Moses, produced at age 86 and signed "Moses". It was sold at Sotheby's in 2006 for US$598,400.

It shows a scene of the artist's interpretation of Samuel Woodworth's poem The Old Oaken Bucket, set in a typical Moses winter setting. The figures are taking part in various scenes described by the poem, but the central object, the oaken bucket itself, is barely visible near the well. A summer version of this painting won the New York State Prize in 1941 and the subject became a bestseller for the artist.

The title of this painting may indicate the artist felt at the time that this would be her last version, but she would continue to paint summer and winter versions of this story over the next five years. The painting was previously owned by Garson Kanin and Ruth Gordon. The painting also became the cover for Cathie Pelletier's novel The Weight of Winter, in 1991.

== See also ==
- Galerie St. Etienne
- The Old Oaken Bucket, 1945 summer version
