= Grandma Moses record book =

Record book for tracking paintings

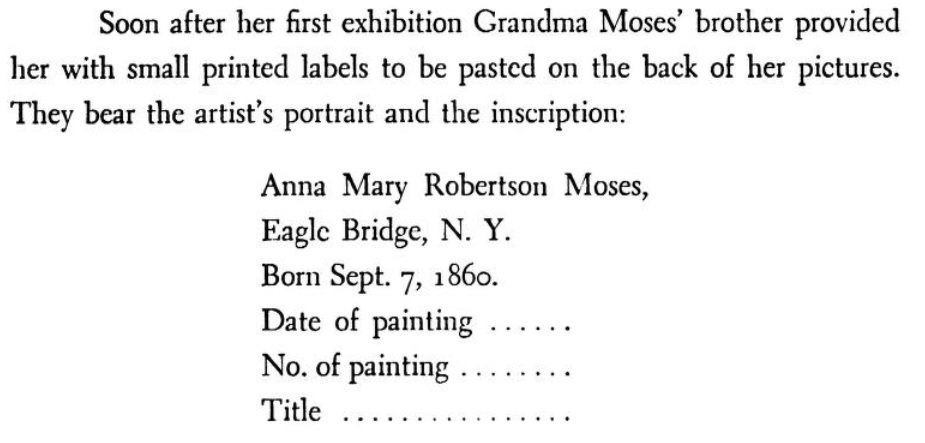
- Short description by Kallir of the form in use by Grandma Moses on the stickers she placed on the back of paintings after 1941
- Author: Grandma Moses
- Publication date: started in 1941, ended when she died in 1961

The Grandma Moses record book is a small book given in 1941 to Grandma Moses by her brother Fred E. Robertson for keeping track of the titles of paintings she made. According to Otto Kallir in 1975, "The book is bound in black boards; it measures 7 1/2 by 10 inches and bears the word "Record" in gold lettering on the cover. The pages are numbered from 1 to 152."

Robertson was a painter himself, and was probably trying to help his sister keep track of her sales in a similar way that he did. He also gave her a set of stickers with her photo and a small form with date, number and title, which would correspond to the lines in the book. These stickers were to be filled out and stuck on the backs of the paintings she sold. He had included headings for "number", "year completed", and "title" on the first few pages of the record book to help her.

Kallir, who started cataloguing Grandma Moses paintings himself a few years after she starting recording in this book, claimed the numbering was not always accurate or in order, and did not always match the stickers placed on the backs of the paintings themselves, though this was the intention. He was never able to fathom her numbering logic, but his methodical research resulted in a catalog raisonné published in 1973 with 1,316 unique "RB" numbers from her record book, that clearly increase in number.

In 1951 Winona Fisher, Grandma Moses' daughter, took over the tedious work of reconciling the numbers, which resulted in a more accurate match between the data on the stickers and in the record book. The highest "RB" number Otto Kallir recorded in 1973 was 2,211 and considering most of the paintings the artist made before 1941 never had "RB" numbers, then this could possibly mean there is roughly a thousand more paintings by her extant than have been previously supposed. Now and then estate sales include paintings with unmistakably authentic labels on the back that do not match the titles associated with those dates and/or "RB" numbers in the record book or the 1973 catalog. The Galerie St. Etienne solved this problem after the artist's death by issuing "new" catalog numbers in the Otto Kallir cataloguing system that places these newly discovered paintings within the proper context of date painted and subject portrayed.

== See also ==
- Pictures of a few pages of the record book, Kallir 1975, page 118
- Pictures of the label stickers in use from 1941 until the ran out in 1950, and the ones in use from 1950 onwards, Kallir 1975, page 119
- Otto Kallir, Grandma Moses American Primitive, Doubleday & Co., Garden City, New York, 1947
- Otto Kallir, Grandma Moses, Complete edition, New York, Harry N. Abrams, 1973
- 175639, Christie's sale May 24, 1990, lot 262 for The Old Oaken Bucket in Summer, which lists the metadata with title, artist signature "Moses" lower right, label on the back dated to the day December 4, 1952, showing matching title and "RB" number 1551, which in turn is listed on page 58 of the Grandma Moses record book as number 1551 according to 1973 catalog number 1060 by Otto Kallir.
