= Wash Day (Grandma Moses) =

1945 painting by Grandma Moses

- Artist: Grandma Moses
- Year: 1945
- Medium: Oil paint, composition board
- Dimensions: 45.7 cm (18.0 in) × 59.7 cm (23.5 in)
- Location: Rhode Island School of Design Museum
- Accession: 46.342

Wash Day is a 1945 oil painting by the American outsider painter Grandma Moses, produced at age 85 and signed "Moses". It has been in the collection of the Rhode Island School of Design Museum since 1946.

It shows a scene of the artist's impression of a wash day, with a clothes line flapping in the wind before a house with people gathered around a well with large wash tubs.

== See also ==
- Galerie St. Etienne
