= Jane Stickle =

American artist (1817–1896)

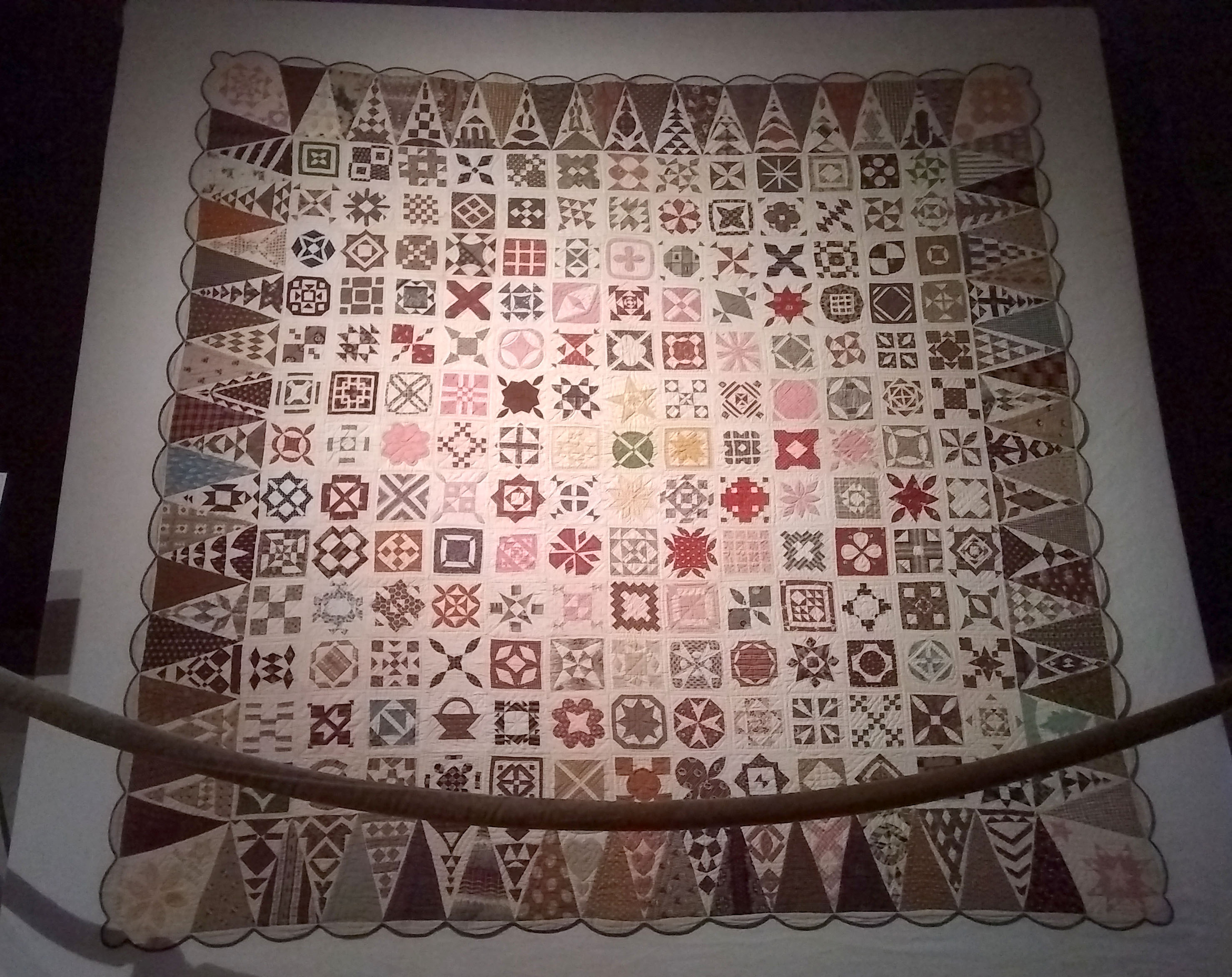
The Jane Stickle Quilt on display at the Bennington Museum

Jane A. Blakeley Stickle (1817-1896) was an American artist. She is most known for a quilt she completed in 1863, known as the 'Dear Jane' quilt.

== Early life ==
Jane A. Blakeley was born in Shaftsbury, Vermont on April 8, 1817. She married on 29 October 1844, Walter Stickle and together they took in at least three local children. The couple lived in Shaftsbury throughout their marriage, and with Jane's brother, Erasatus Blakely, owned several farms and tracts of land. Research continues on the relationship between Erastus and Walter, but it appears that they were breeding and racing horses. When Erastus died in 1878, Jane and Walter defaulted on the mortgages of their various properties, lost everything and became wards of the Town. Walter died in 1883, and Jane in 1896.

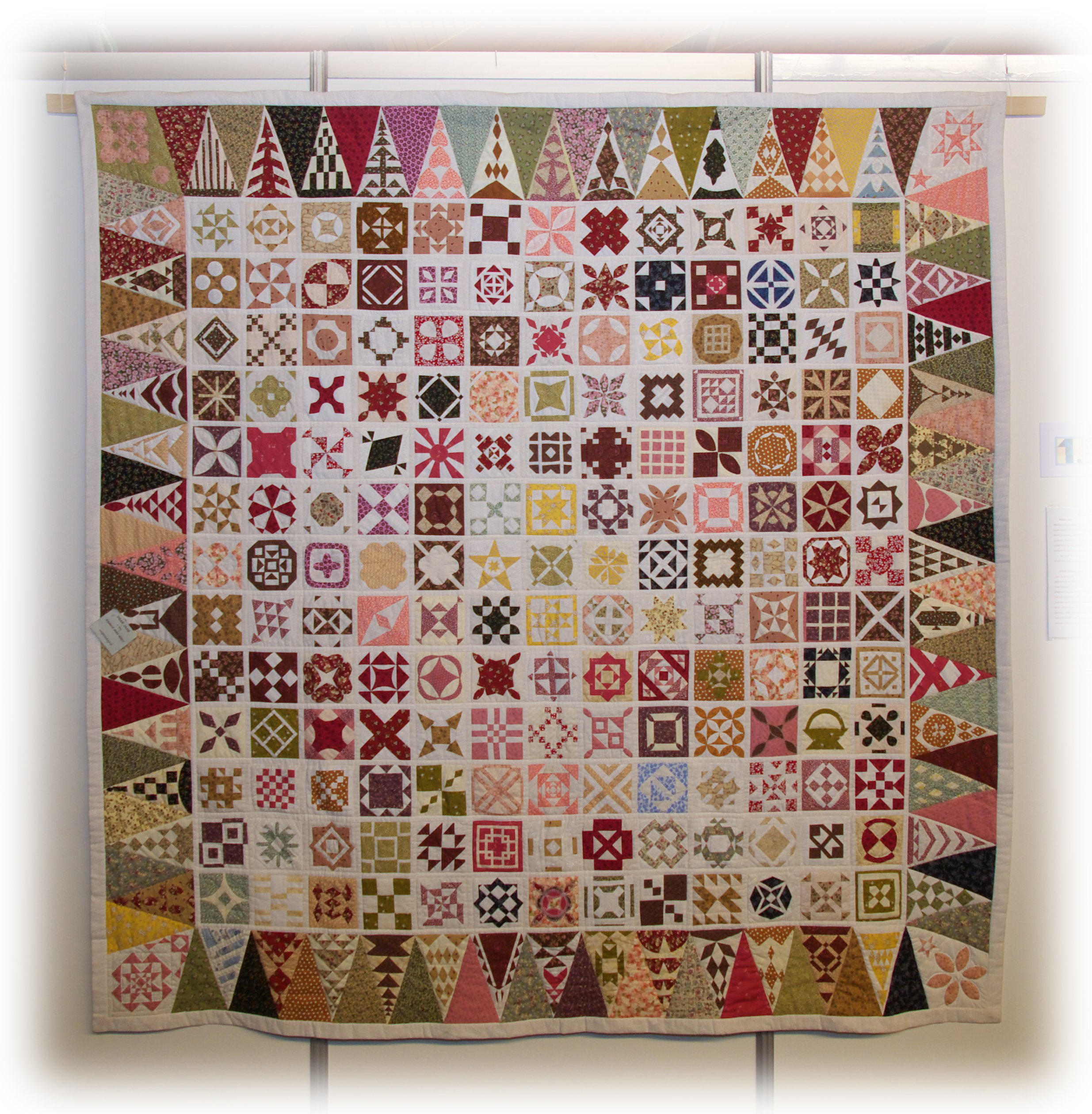
This photo shows a modern quilt created to resemble and pay tribute to the 1863 quilt created by Jane Stickle.

== Quilt ==
Stickle's magnum opus quilt was created of linen and cotton and is composed of 5602 pieces. These pieces make 169 blocks measuring five inches square, and a scalloped border. Stickle embroidered her name and the words “In War Time 1863”, and the number of pieces used into one corner of the quilt. The back of the quilt is made of recycled fine linen sheets. One has the initials 'SB' embroidered on the back, a reference to her mother Sarah Blakeley who once owned the sheets. Stickle used many different fabrics in her quilt, and each printed fabric appears in only one block on the quilt. It has been determined that while 30% of the block patterns on the quilt were documented traditional blocks, the bulk of the designs were created by Stickle.

In October of 1863, the Bennington Banner reported that Stickle had won a prize of $2 for "a very extra quilt" at the county agricultural fair. The paper also reported that "Mrs. Stickles is an invalid lady, having been for a long time confined to her bed, but her ambition to do something to kill time ended her to put together this quilt."

The quilt is in the permanent collection of the Bennington Museum. It is exhibited for short periods of time in the autumn of each year to reduce wear and aging. It has also been exhibited virtually.

In 1996, Brenda Papadakis published Dear Jane: The Two Hundred Twenty-five Patterns from the 1863 Jane A. Stickle Quilt, sparking global interest in the quilt. The quilt became known as the Dear Jane Quilt. Modern quilters now create their own Dear Jane quilts. Many books, kits, software, and patterns exist to aid quilters in their Dear Jane projects.
