= Jane Kallir =

American art dealer, curator and author (born 1954)

Jane Kallir (born July 30, 1954) is an American art dealer, curator and author. She is co-director of the Galerie St. Etienne in New York, which specializes in Austrian and German Expressionism as well as self-taught and “outsider” art. In 2020, the gallery ceased commercial operations and became an art advisory. Its archives and library were transferred to the Kallir Research Institute, a foundation established in 2017. Kallir serves as President of the KRI. She has curated exhibitions for many American and international museums and is the author of the catalogue raisonné of Egon Schiele’s work in all mediums.

== Life and career ==
Kallir was born in New York City and graduated from Brown University in 1976, with a BA in art and art history. In 1977, she began working for her grandfather, Otto Kallir, who founded the Galerie St. Etienne in 1939 in New York.

She became the gallery’s co-director, with Hildegard Bachert (d. 2019), in 1979. In 1985, Kallir married Gary Cosimini, whom she had met in college. The couple divorced in 1996 and remarried in 2008.

Under Kallir’s direction in 1980, the Galerie St. Etienne initiated a regular program of museum-scale loan exhibitions, a practice not then common among commercial galleries. These shows were routinely accompanied by book-length catalogues, published by trade publishers. Lenders included the Museum of Fine Arts, Boston, the Art Institute of Chicago, the Solomon R. Guggenheim Museum, the Metropolitan Museum of Art, the Museum of Modern Art, the Whitney Museum of American Art, the Hirshhorn Museum and Sculpture Garden, the Phillips Collection, the Kunsthalle Bremen, the Lenbachhaus in Munich, the National Gallery of Canada in Ottawa, the Wien Museum and the Belvedere in Vienna, plus many private collectors.

In addition to writing scholarly texts to accompany the Galerie St. Etienne’s exhibitions, Kallir became known for her annual “Art Market Reports."

Jane Kallir has curated numerous museum shows both nationally and internationally. A frequent lecturer, she has written over twenty art books and many catalog essays. The Galerie St. Etienne is a longstanding member of the Art Dealers Association of America, which Kallir served as Vice President from 2003-2006.

In 1994, Kallir was recognized with the Silver Medal of Honor for Services to the Republic of Austria.

== Museum exhibitions ==
Kallir has organized over 50 museum exhibitions in the United States, Austria, France, Germany, Italy, Japan, South Korea and The Netherlands. Institutions with which she has worked include the National Gallery of Art, Washington, D.C.; the National Museum of Women in the Arts, Washington, D.C.; the Hangaram Museum of Art, Seoul Art Center, South Korea; and the Museo del Vittoriano, Rome, Italy.

She has curated three shows for the Belvedere in Vienna: Egon Schiele in der Österreichischen Galerie, Egon Schiele: Self-Portraits and Portraits, and The Women of Klimt, Schiele and Kokoschka.

Kallir has also sent Grandma Moses exhibitions to more than 30 venues in the U.S. and Japan.

== Publications ==
Kallir is the author of 21 art books. She has published nine volumes on Egon Schiele, including the artist’s catalogue raisonné, and seven studies on other aspects of fin-de-siècle Austrian art. Her 1986 history, Viennese Design and the Wiener Werkstätte, remains a standard text on the subject.

Kallir’s most recent publication is The Women of Klimt, Schiele and Kokoschka, to accompany the exhibition she curated at The Belvedere in 2015. Kallir’s writings also include four volumes on Grandma Moses, as well as Richard Gertle Oskar Kokoschka, which accompanied an exhibition at Galerie St. Etienne in New York City in 1992.

Kallir has written numerous magazine articles, as well as exhibition catalogue essays for such institutions as the Louisiana Museum in Copenhagen, the Schirn Kunsthalle in Frankfurt, the Centre Georges Pompidou in Paris, the National Gallery of Canada in Ottawa, the Milwaukee Art Museum, the Neue Galerie New York the American Folk Art Museum and the Philadelphia Museum of Art. As an author, Jane Kallir has received several literary prizes. In 1982, the “Art Libraries Societies Award” was awarded to The Folk Art Tradition, and in 1985 for Arnold Schoenberg’s Vienna.

Both the Elie Faure Award and the Prix des Lecteurs de Beaux-Arts Magazin were given in 1991 for Egon Schiele: The Complete Works.

== Anna Mary Robertson (“Grandma”) Moses ==
The Galerie St. Etienne mounted “Grandma” Moses’s first one-person show in 1940, and represented her exclusively until her death in 1961. In 1973, Otto Kallir and Galerie St. Etienne co-director Hildegard Bachert published a catalogue raisonné of Moses’s paintings.

The Moses archives are now housed at the Kallir Research Institute, where the material is made available to scholars. The KRI is planning a digital update of the Moses catalogue raisonné, and Jane Kallir provides opinions regarding the authenticity of works not included in the 1973 edition.

In 2018, Kallir agreed to donate 10 “Grandma” Moses paintings to the Smithsonian American Art Museum (SAAM). The longterm goal is to establish a Moses study center at the museum. SAAM will host a major Moses exhibition in 2025.

== Egon Schiele ==
Kallir is the foremost expert on the work of Egon Schiele, publishing Egon Schiele, the Complete Works in 1990, with an update in 1998. The Kallir Research Institute issued a digital update of the catalogue raisonné, Egon Schiele Online, in 2018.

Kallir regularly provides opinions regarding works not in that catalogue raisonné, in addition to maintaining an archive of Schiele works authenticated since 1998. Kallir has been instrumental in calling attention to the spoliation of art by the Nazi regime. Many Schiele collectors were persecuted after Hitler annexed Austria in 1938. Egon Schiele: The Complete Works contains an appendix, “Who’s Who in the Provenances,” documenting collections that were looted or otherwise lost during the Nazi years.

In 1997, Kallir gave the New York Times a file documenting the Nazi theft of Schiele’s painting Portrait of Wally. The resulting story led to the seizure of the painting by the NY District Attorney and a twelve-year lawsuit. As a result, the Austrian Parliament in 1998 issued a decree reopening the claims process for State museums, and in 2010, the heirs of the original owner of Portrait of Wally received a settlement of $19 million. Kallir’s role in the case is featured in the 2012 documentary film Portrait of Wally.

The opening of previously sealed Austrian archives, in tandem with the 1998 restitution decree, has produced a wealth of new evidence documenting Nazi spoliation. Kallir continues to work with Austrian researchers on updating Schiele provenances.
