= Fireboard =

Panel to cover a fireplace during warm months of the year

A fireboard or chimney board is a panel designed to cover a fireplace during the warm months of the year. It was "commonly used during the later 18th and early 19th centuries" in places like France and New England.

== Overview ==
In warm weather, "a fireboard effectively reduced the number of mosquitoes and other insects, or even birds, that might enter a house through an open, damperless chimney." The "board or shutterlike contrivance" typically "of wood or cast of sheet metal" is "frequently decorated with painting and stencilling." Some fireboards have notches cut out of the lowest edge to accommodate andirons. Fireboards are also called: chimney boards, chimney pieces, chimney stops, fire boards, summer boards.

== Production ==
Among the many artists who have produced ornamental fireboards: Robert Adam; Winthrop Chandler (1747–1790); Andien de Clermont; Charles Codman; Michele Felice Cornè; Edward Hicks; Jean-Baptiste Oudry; Rufus Porter. Examples of decorated fireboards are in numerous collections, including: Historic Deerfield, Massachusetts; Historic New England; National Gallery of Art, Washington, DC, USA; Peabody Essex Museum; Victoria & Albert Museum.

== Gallery ==
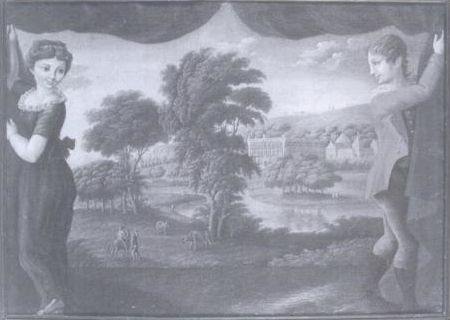
Fireboard with view of Chatsworth, Derbyshire, England, by M.F. Corné

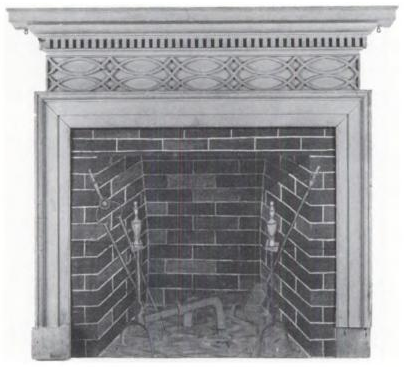
Fireboard decorated with trompe-l'oeil image of a fireplace and mantel, ca.1825 (Historic New England)

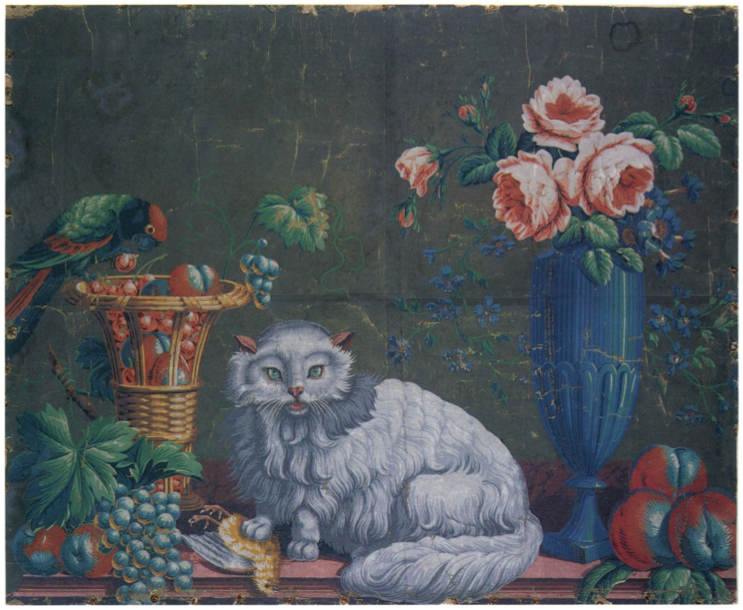
Cat and Canary fireboard, France, ca.1830-1840 (Cooper Hewitt Museum)

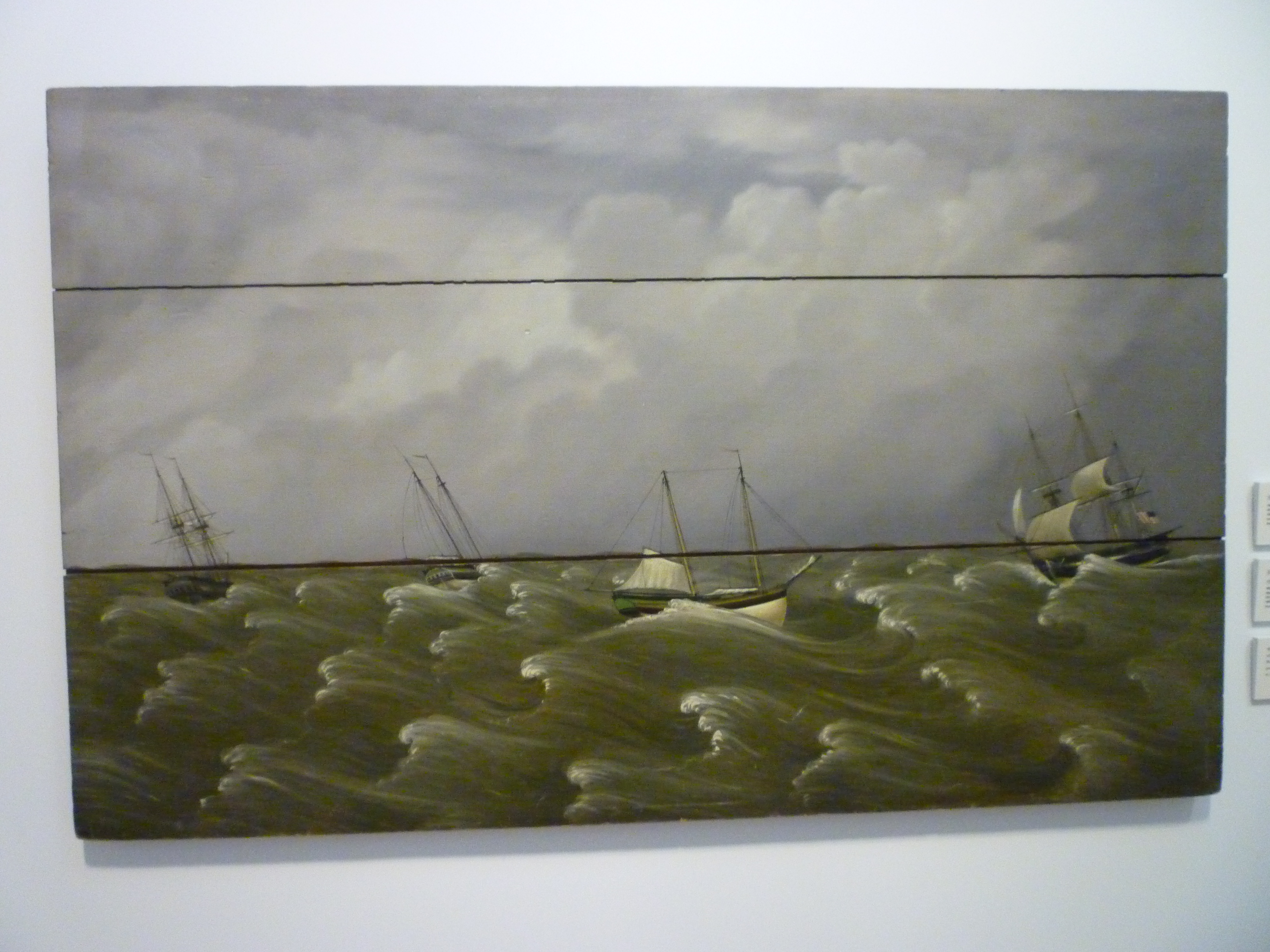
Great Gale of 1846 fireboard (Peabody Essex Museum)

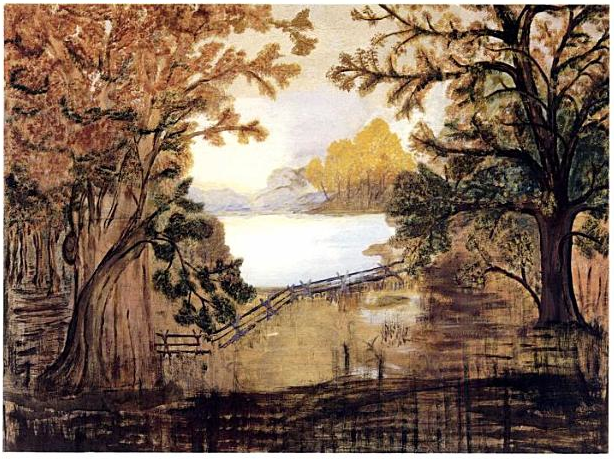
Fireboard by Grandma Moses, 1918

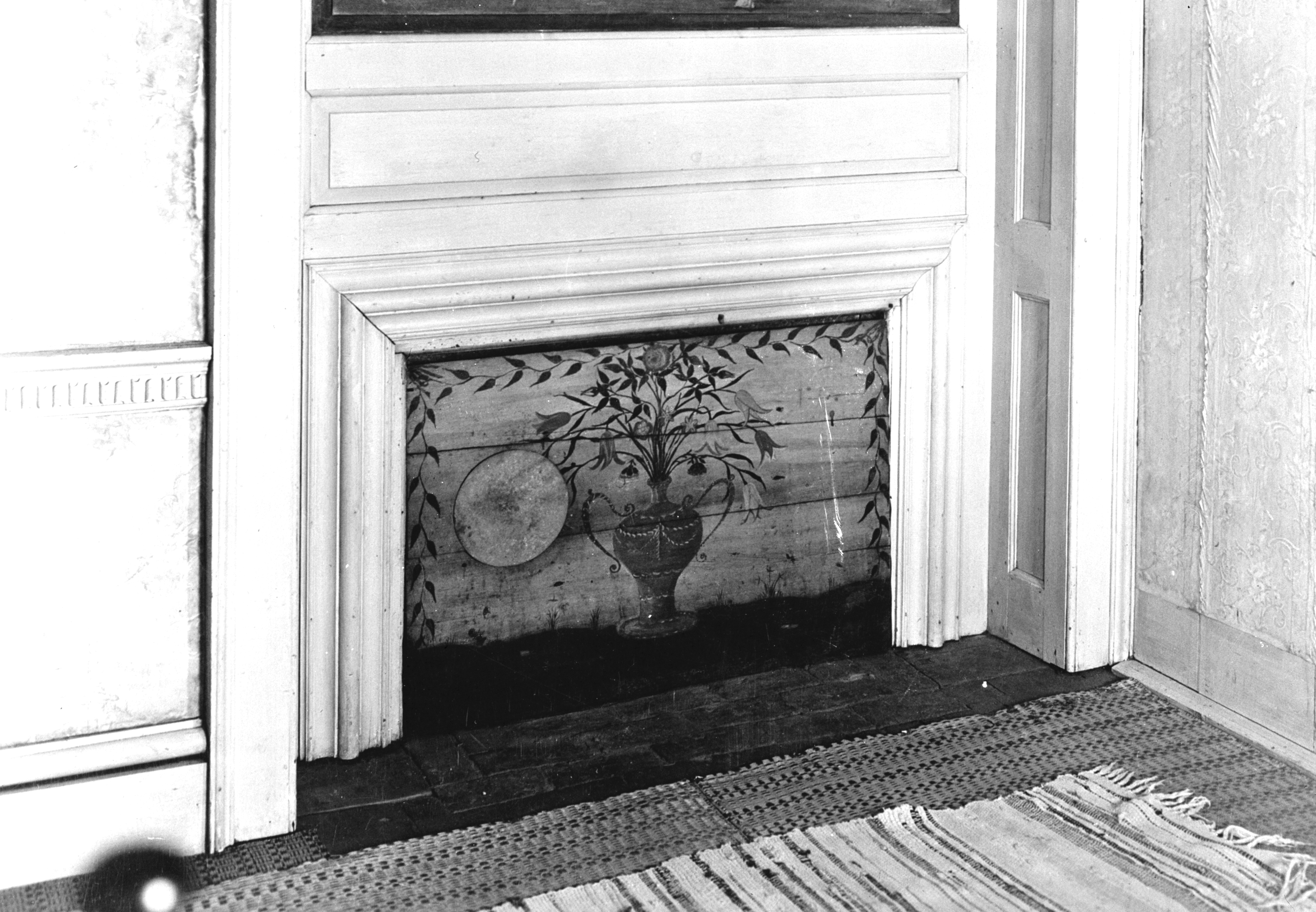
Banister House, Brookfield, Massachusetts, USA (photo 1936) (Library of Congress)
