= Charles Codman =

American painter (1800–1842)

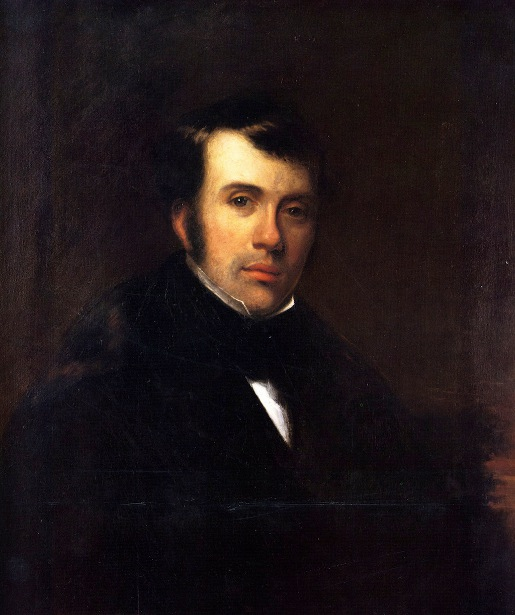
- Portrait of Charles Codman
- Born: Charles Codman; 1800; Portland, Maine, U.S.
- Died: September 11, 1842 (aged 41–42); Portland, Maine, U.S.
- Patrons: James Deering

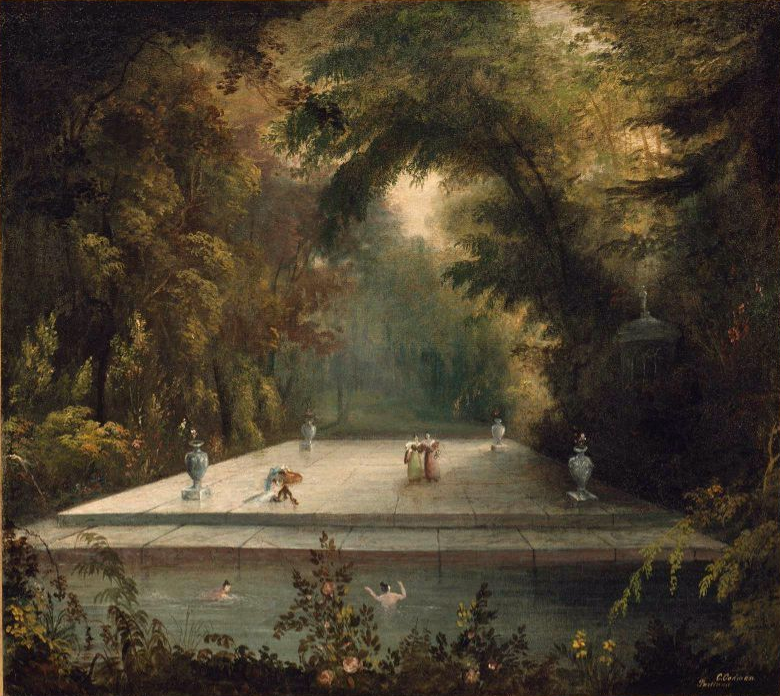
Bathing Pool c.1830, now in the Museum of Fine Arts, Boston

Charles Codman (1800 – September 11, 1842) was an American painter. A native of Portland, Maine, he was known for his landscape and marine paintings.

== Career ==
Codman was apprenticed to the ornamental painter John Ritto Penniman, where he began as a decorative painter with no formal training. He is classified as a limner. He eventually produced more mature works of romanticized landscape views. One of his more important commissions was to paint five fireboards (decorative panels placed over hearths during the summertime) in the landscape style for the Portland mansion of shipbuilder James Deering. He also filled commissions for both portraiture and decorative arts.

In 1827 Codman received the first informed criticism of his work by eccentric and influential writer and critic John Neal. As his greatest promoter, and through his connections, Neal was likely most responsible for Codman becoming as established, patronized painter.

Codman died on September 11, 1842, in Portland, Maine. He is buried in Eastern Cemetery.

Today, Codman's work can be found in various museums and institutions such as the Museum of Fine Arts, Boston, the Brooklyn Museum, and the Smithsonian American Art Museum.
