= Sugaring Off (Grandma Moses) =

1943 painting by Grandma Moses

- Artist: Grandma Moses
- Medium: oil on canvas
- Dimensions: 91.4 cm × 114.3 cm (36.0 in × 45.0 in)
- Location: private collection

Sugaring Off is a 1943 oil painting by the American outsider painter Grandma Moses, produced at age 83 and signed "Moses". It sold by Christie's in 2006 for US$1,360,000.

It is the artist's interpretation of maple syrup season with people busy at various tasks, set in a typical Moses winter setting. The figures are getting ready to pour syrup on snow for children, take empty buckets to hang on taps driven into maple trees, or carry full buckets with a yoke towards a bonfire to boil the sap down into syrup, known as sugaring off. The subject of this painting had been a recurring theme since 1939 and became a bestseller for the artist.

This painting was acquired by Cole Porter who gifted it to Cy Feuer.

== See also ==
- Galerie St. Etienne
