= Sugaring Off (French novel) =

2022 young adult novel by Gillian French

- First edition cover
- Author: Gillian French
- Publisher: Hachette Books
- Publication date: 2022
- ISBN: 9781643752709

Sugaring Off is a 2022 young adult novel by Gillian French.

An audiobook narrated by Caitlin Davies was released.

== Plot ==
Seventeen-year old Owl is sent to stay in her uncle's New England after she is deafened by her abusive father.

== Reception ==
Kate Quealy-Gainer of the Bulletin of the Center for Children's Books wrote that French: "treats her working-class characters with compassion but not preciousness, with a third-person narration that shows the complications of small-town life without exploiting it for drama." Connie Williams of School Library Journal praised the book.

Amy MacDonald of the Portland Press Herald said it was "a love song to winter in the backwoods of New England. It's as infused with the sweet flavor of the outdoors as the maple syrup made in the protagonist's backyard sugarhouse."
