= Jane Perry Clark Carey =

American political scientist (1898–1981)

- Born: September 16, 1898; Washington, U.S.
- Died: October 24, 1981 (aged 83); Manhattan, New York City, New York, U.S.
- Education: Vassar College; Columbia University

Jane Perry Clark Carey (September 16, 1898 – October 24, 1981) was an American political scientist and consultant to the Federal Government specializing in displaced persons and refugees.

== Early life ==
Jane Perry Clark was born in Washington and raised in New York City in a progressive household deeply engaged in social and political discourse. Her upbringing was marked by intellectual stimulation and a commitment to social justice, instilled by her parents who were activists in their own right. From an early age, she was encouraged to question prevailing norms and explore alternative perspectives, fostering her independent thinking. Growing up in a politically charged environment, she was exposed to a wide range of ideologies, which laid the foundation for her future academic pursuits. Carey's upbringing imbued her with a sense of responsibility towards societal issues, influencing her later work in political science and activism.

Carey completed her undergraduate studies at Vassar College before earning her master's and doctoral degrees from Columbia University.

== Career ==
Carey taught American government at Barnard College from 1929 to 1953, ascending from instructor to assistant professor. Her scholarly pursuits included a focus on constitutional law.

Beginning in 1944, during World War II, Carey served as an assistant adviser to the U.S. Department of State on displaced persons and refugees, a role she held until 1946, when she was promoted to consultant. There, she provided expertise on refugees and displaced persons during critical periods of global conflict and recovery. In 1948, she became a consultant to the United States Military Government in Germany. She served with the State Department again in 1951, and from 1964 to 1967.

In 1952, she served as chief investigator for a joint Canadian and United States survey of refugees for the United Nations High Commissioner for Refugees.

=== Written works ===
Her first major written work was the 1938 book The Rise of a New Federalism, which explored the dynamics of federal-state cooperation during the New Deal era. She dedicated the book to her close friend U.S. Supreme Court Justice Benjamin N. Cardozo, with whom she maintained correspondence for many years. The book argues that "the federal and state governments are not separate and rival agencies but that they are both necessary to handle the manifold problems of government today".

Carey wrote extensively on migration studies and the complexities of post-war reconstruction, including in the books Deportation of Aliens from the United States to Europe (1931) and The Role of Uprooted People in European Recovery (1948).

She collaborated with her husband, Andrew Galbraith Carey (d. 1974), on multiple articles on political and economic developments across various countries, and on the 1968 book The Web of Modern Greek Politics.

== Personal life ==
Carey resided in Manhattan and Weston, Connecticut, until her death at the age of 83. She was an avid traveler, journeying extensively to regions such as the Middle East and China, even in her octogenarian years.

== Publications ==
=== Books ===
- Clark, Jane Perry (1931). Deportation of Aliens from the United States to Europe. Studies in History, Economics, and Public Law. Vol. 351. Columbia University Press. doi:10.7312/clar90834. ISBN 978-0-231-88072-5.
- The Rise of a New Federalism (1938)
- The Role of Uprooted People in European Recovery (1948)
- The Web of Modern Greek Politics (1968) with Andrew Galbraith Carey

=== Articles ===
- Clark, Jane Perry (1929). "Administrative Standards in Deportation Procedure". Political Science Quarterly. 44 (2): 193–214. doi:10.2307/2142993. ISSN 0032-3195. JSTOR 2142993.
- Clark, Jane Perry (1934). "Emergencies and the Law". Political Science Quarterly. 49 (2): 268–283. doi:10.2307/2142885. ISSN 0032-3195. JSTOR 2142885.
- Clark, Jane Perry (1935). "Interstate Compacts and Social Legislation". Political Science Quarterly. 50 (4): 502–524. doi:10.2307/2144000. ISSN 0032-3195. JSTOR 2144000.
- Clark, Jane Perry (1936). "Joint Activity Between Federal and State Officials". Political Science Quarterly. 51 (2): 230–269. doi:10.2307/2143624. ISSN 0032-3195. JSTOR 2143624.
- Clark, Jane Perry (1936–1937). "Some Recent Proposals for Constitutional Amendment". Wisconsin Law Review. 12: 313.
- Clark, Jane Perry (August 1941). "Individual Claims to Social Benefits, I". American Political Science Review. 35 (4): 665–682. doi:10.2307/1948074. ISSN 1537-5943. JSTOR 1948074.
- Carey, Jane Perry Clark (1943). "Labor Laws and War Production in the United States". Political Science Quarterly. 58 (1): 25–46. doi:10.2307/2144426. ISSN 0032-3195. JSTOR 2144426.
- Carey, Jane Perry Clark (February 1946). "Some Aspects of Statelessness Since World War I". American Political Science Review. 40 (1): 113–123. doi:10.2307/1949951. ISSN 1537-5943. JSTOR 1949951.
- Carey, Jane Perry Clark (1951). "Political Organization of the Refugees and Expellees in West Germany". Political Science Quarterly. 66 (2): 191–215. doi:10.2307/2145501. ISSN 0032-3195. JSTOR 2145501.
- Carey, Jane Perry Clark (1953). "The Admission and Integration of Refugees in the United States". Journal of International Affairs. 7 (1): 66–74. ISSN 0022-197X. JSTOR 24355264.
- Carey, Jane Perry Clark; Carey, Andrew Galbraith (1957). "The Varying Seasons of Italian Politics, 1956–57". Political Science Quarterly. 72 (2): 200–223. doi:10.2307/2145773. ISSN 0032-3195. JSTOR 2145773.
- Carey, Jane Perry Clark; Carey, Andrew Galbraith (1958). "The Italian Elections of 1958 – Unstable Stability in an Unstable World". Political Science Quarterly. 73 (4): 566–589. doi:10.2307/2146031. ISSN 0032-3195. JSTOR 2146031.
- Carey, Jane Perry Clark; Carey, Andrew Galbraith (1958). "Oil for the Lamps of Italy". Political Science Quarterly. 73 (2): 234–253. doi:10.2307/2146092. ISSN 0032-3195. JSTOR 2146092.
- Carey, Jane Perry Clark; Carey, Andrew Galbraith (1960). "Oil and Economic Development in Iran". Political Science Quarterly. 75 (1): 66–86. doi:10.2307/2146458. ISSN 0032-3195. JSTOR 2146458.
- Carey, Jane Perry Clark; Carey, Andrew Galbraith (1961). "Libya – No Longer 'Arid Nurse of Lions'". Political Science Quarterly. 76 (1): 47–68. doi:10.2307/2145970. ISSN 0032-3195. JSTOR 2145970.
- Carey, Jane Perry Clark; Carey, Andrew Galbraith (1962). "The Two Developing Worlds of Morocco: A Case Study in Economic Development and Planning". Middle East Journal. 16 (4): 457–475. ISSN 0026-3141. JSTOR 4323524.
- Carey, Jane Perry Clark; Carey, Andrew Galbraith (1969). "Swedish Politics in the Late Nineteen-Sixties: Dynamic Stability". Political Science Quarterly. 84 (3): 461–485. doi:10.2307/2147270. ISSN 0032-3195. JSTOR 2147270.
- Carey, Jane Perry Clark; Carey, Andrew Galbraith (1971). "Turkish Industry and the Five Year Plans". Middle East Journal. 25 (3): 337–354. ISSN 0026-3141. JSTOR 4324778.
- Carey, Jane Perry Clark; Carey, Andrew Galbraith (January 1972). "Turkish Agriculture and the Five-Year Development Plans". International Journal of Middle East Studies. 3 (1): 45–58. doi:10.1017/S0020743800030038. ISSN 1471-6380.
- Carey, Jane Perry Clark (1974). "Iran and Control of Its Oil Resources". Political Science Quarterly. 89 (1): 147–174. doi:10.2307/2148119. ISSN 0032-3195. JSTOR 2148119.
- Carey, Jane Perry Clark; Carey, Andrew G. (1975). "Industrial Growth and Development Planning in Iran". Middle East Journal. 29 (1): 1–15. ISSN 0026-3141. JSTOR 4325325.
- Carey, Jane Perry Clark; Carey, Andrew Galbraith (July 1976). "Iranian Agriculture and Its Development: 1952–1973". International Journal of Middle East Studies. 7 (3): 359–382. doi:10.1017/S002074380002571X. ISSN 1471-6380.
