= Eagle Bridge, New York =

Eagle Bridge
- Hamlet
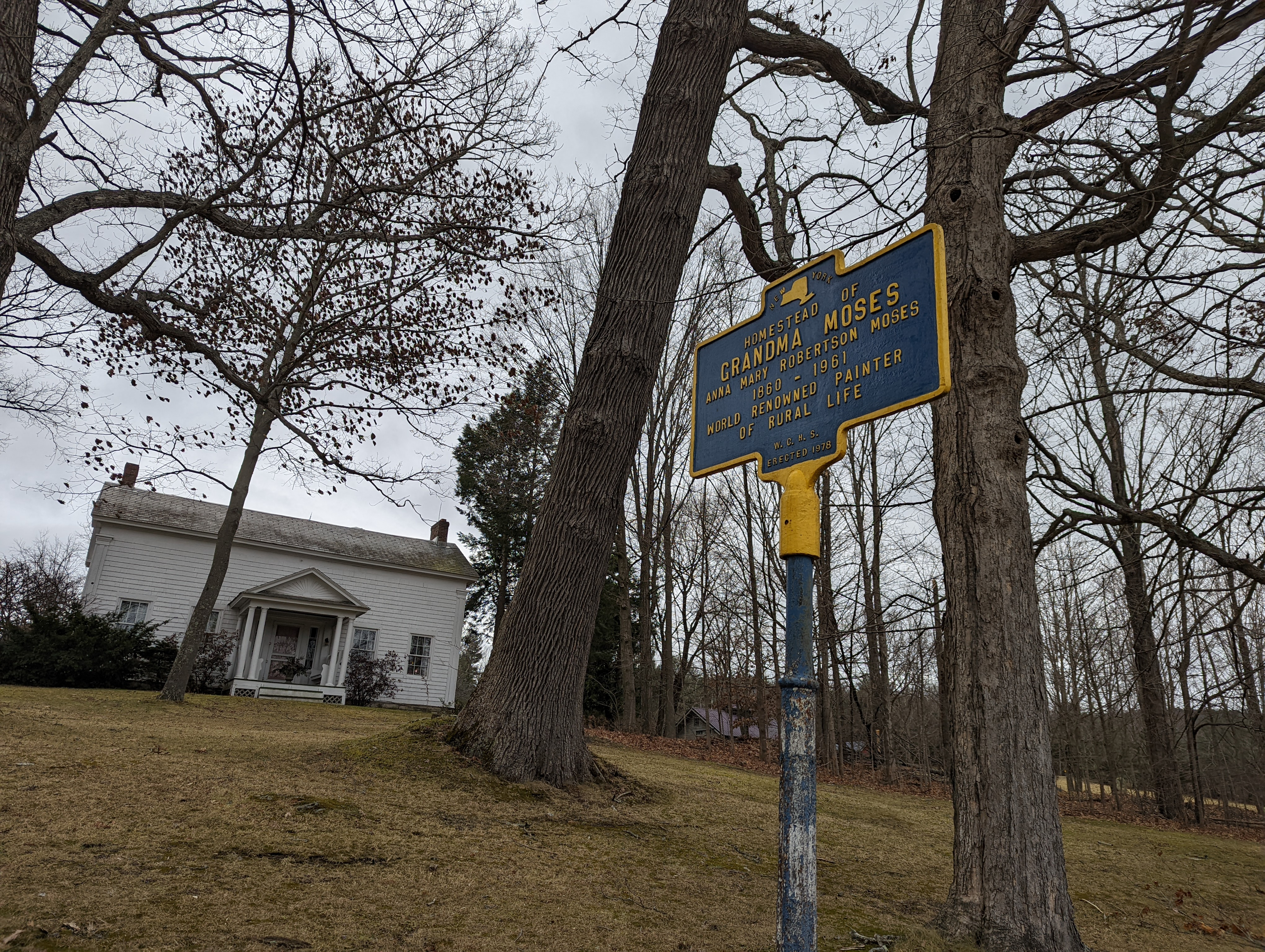
- Home of Grandma Moses

- Location of Eagle Bridge in New York
- Country: United States
- State: New York
- County: Washington
- ZIP code: 12057

Eagle Bridge is a hamlet in Rensselaer County, New York, United States.

Eagle Bridge is also the name used by the United States Postal Service to identify ZIP code 12057. This ZIP code is in the vicinity of Eagle Bridge hamlet; It includes part of the town of Hoosick in Rensselaer County and most of the town of White Creek in neighboring Washington County.

The community was named after the eagle for patriotic reasons. American painter Grandma Moses was a long-time resident of Eagle Bridge. The last United States delivery of bulk milk was shipped in August 1972 from Eagle Bridge to Boston.

== Sources ==
- U.S. Geological Survey Geographic Names Information System: Eagle Bridge, New York
