= Grandma Moses =

American painter (1860–1961)

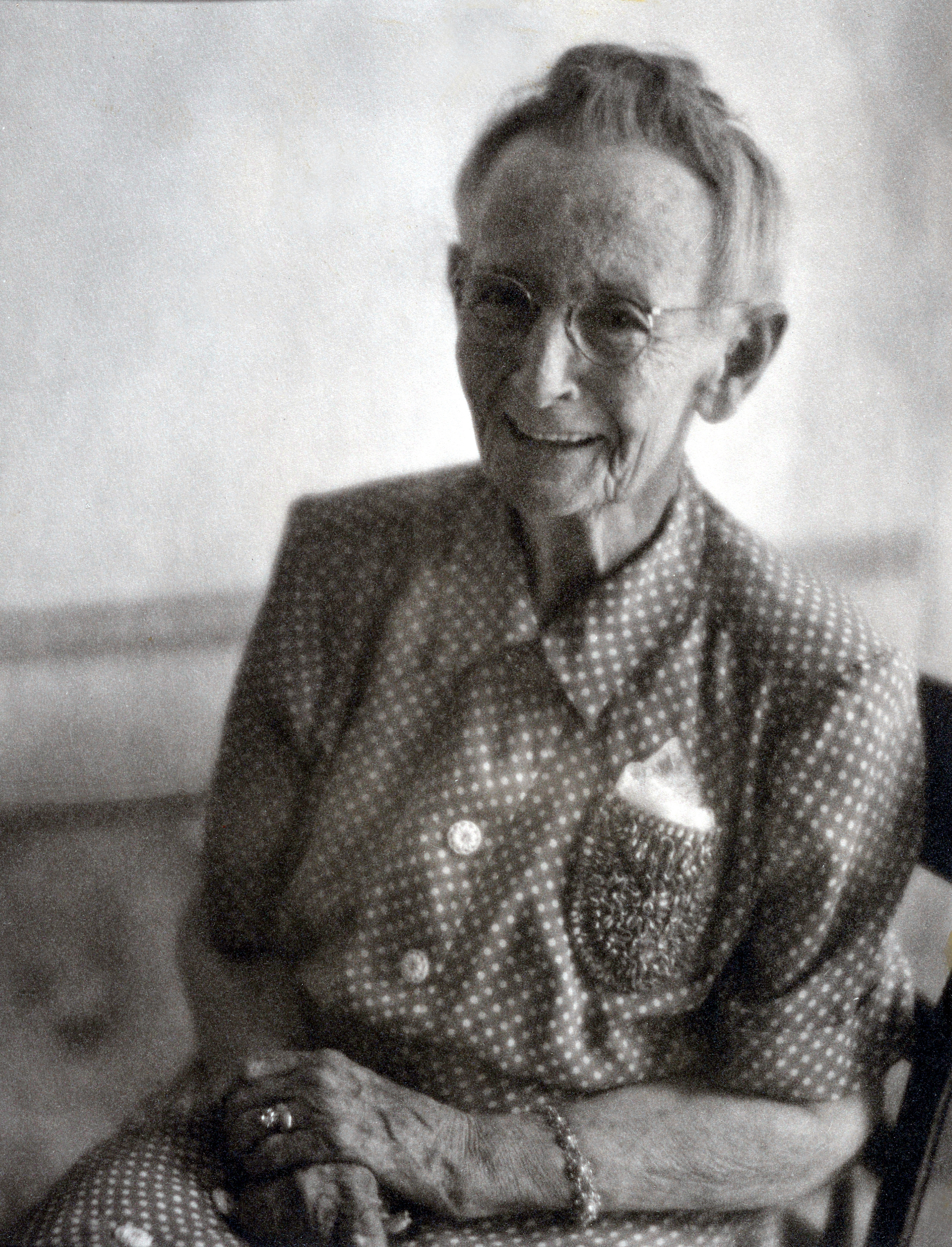
- Moses, c. 1950
- Born: Anna Mary Robertson; September 7, 1860; Greenwich, New York, U.S.
- Died: December 13, 1961 (aged 101); Hoosick Falls, New York, U.S.
- Known for: Painting, embroidery
- Notable work: The Old Checkered Inn in Summer
- Spouse: Thomas Salmon Moses (m. 1887; died 1927)
- Children: 10

Anna Mary Robertson Moses (September 7, 1860 – December 13, 1961), popularly known as Grandma Moses, was an American folk artist. She began painting in earnest at the age of 78 and is a prominent example of a newly successful art career at an advanced age. Moses rose to fame in the 1950s. She was the subject of an Oscar-nominated documentary in 1950, published her autobiography in 1952, and was on the cover of Time Magazine in 1953.

Starting at the age of 12, Moses worked as a live-in housekeeper for 15 years. Moses and her husband began their married life in Virginia, where they worked on farms. In 1905, they settled in Eagle Bridge, New York. They had ten children, five of whom survived infancy. Moses worked in a variety of arts and crafts. Arthritis forced her to focus on painting as she aged.

In her 1961 front page obituary, The New York Times wrote, "The simple realism, nostalgic atmosphere and luminous color with which Grandma Moses portrayed simple farm life and rural countryside won her a wide following. She was able to capture the excitement of winter's first snow, Thanksgiving preparations and the new, young green of oncoming spring...In person, Grandma Moses charmed wherever she went."

Moses's work has been a subject of numerous art exhibitions worldwide and has been extensively merchandised. In 2006, her 1943 painting titled Sugaring Off was sold at Christie's New York for US$1.36 million, setting an auction record for the artist.

== Early life ==
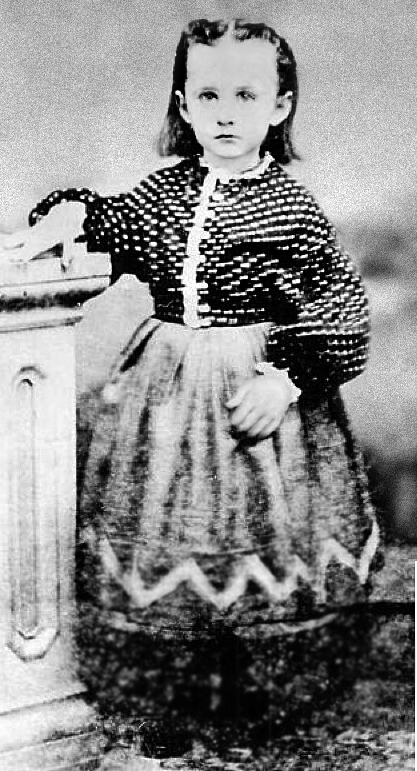
Anna Mary Robertson in the 1860s

Anna Mary Robertson was born in Greenwich, New York, on September 7, 1860, the third of ten children born to Margaret Shanahan Robertson and Russell King Robertson. Her father was a farmer and also ran a flax mill. She briefly attended a one-room school. She was inspired to paint by taking art lessons at school. As a child, she started painting using lemon and grape juice to make colors for her landscapes. She would paint on old crocks and broken dishes using ochre, grass, flour paste, slaked lime, or sawdust as materials.

Robertson was always interested in art. Her father was also a painter. She recalled, "I was quite small, my father would get me and my brothers white paper by the sheet. He liked to see us draw pictures, it was a penny a sheet and lasted longer than candy."

At age 12, she left home to be a hired girl for a wealthy neighboring family. She kept house, cooked, and sewed for wealthy families for 15 years. One family, the Whitesides, noticed her interest in their Currier and Ives prints and bought her chalk and wax crayons.

== Marriage and children ==
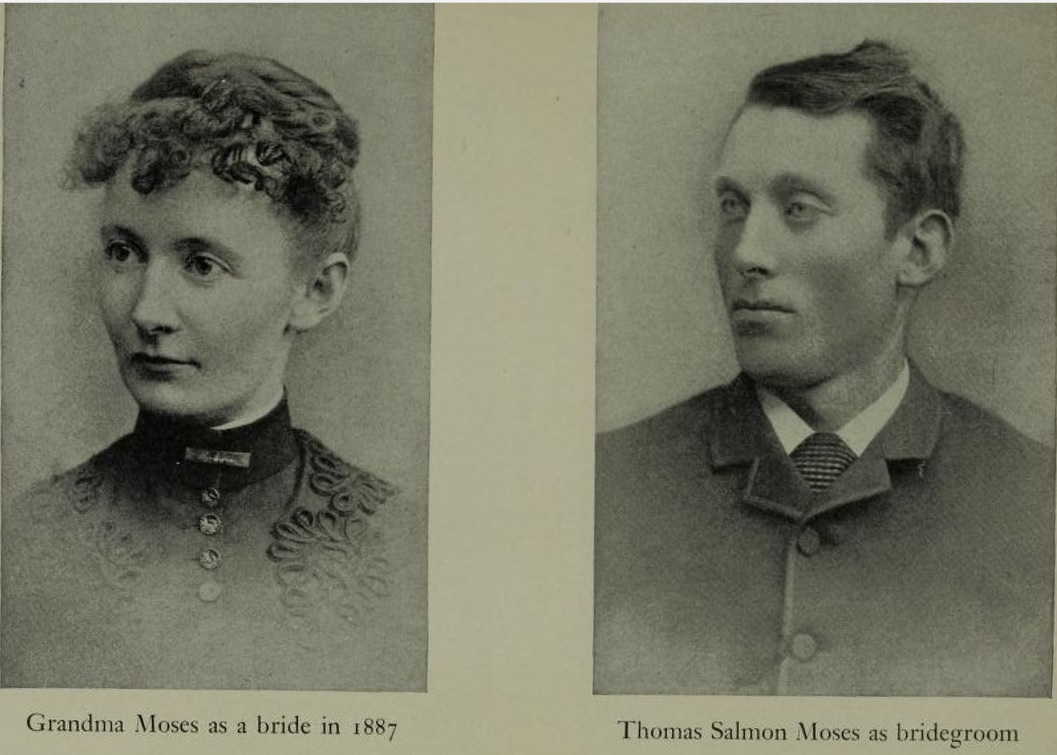
Wedding pendant photos taken in 1887 of Anna Mary and Thomas Moses.

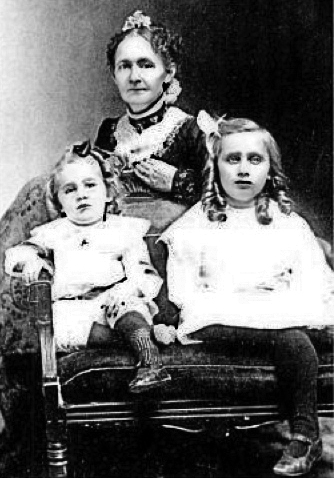
Anna Mary Robertson Moses with two of her children.

At one of the farms where Robertson worked, the hired man was Thomas Salmon Moses. When she was 27, they married and established themselves near Staunton, Virginia, where they spent over a decade renting local farms such as the Bell, Eakle, and Dudley farms where they primarily produced dairy products.

In January 1901, the couple bought Mount Airy farm near Verona, Virginia. It was the first residence the family owned, and they lived there until September 1902. It was listed in the National Register of Historic Places in 2012. They sold Mount Airy and bought Mount Nebo, which their mailman named after the mountain where Moses died. To supplement the family income at Mount Nebo, Anna made potato chips and churned butter from the milk of a cow that she purchased with her savings.

Five of the ten children born to them survived infancy. Although she loved living in the Shenandoah Valley, Thomas was homesick. In 1905, the family moved back north to a farm in Eagle Bridge, New York. Their children insisted on retaining the name Mount Nebo for their new home.

When Thomas Moses was about 65 years of age in 1927, he died of a heart attack, after which Anna's son Forrest helped her operate the farm. She never married again. Her son Hugh and his family moved in to help maintain the house. She was known as either "Mother Moses" or "Grandma Moses", and although she first exhibited as "Mrs. Moses", the press dubbed her "Grandma Moses", and the nickname stuck.

== Art career ==
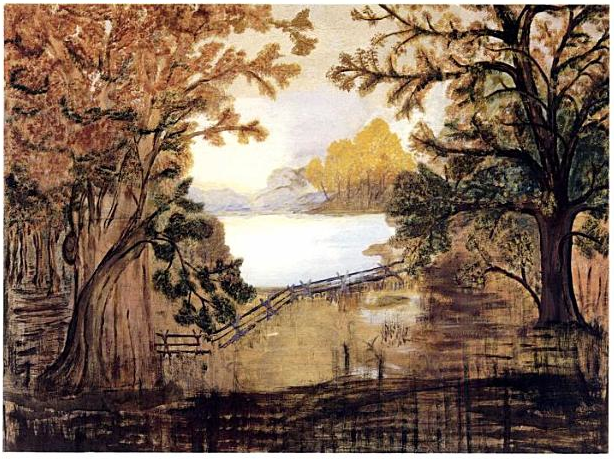
Fireboard decorated by Moses in 1918

As a wife and mother, Moses was creative in her home. In 1918, she used house paint to decorate a fireboard. Beginning in 1932, Moses used yarn to embroider pictures for friends and family. She created quilted objects, a form of hobby art. In the 1970s, art critic and curator Lucy R. Lippard noted that hobby art was considered, "an activity so 'low' on the art lists that it still ranks way below 'folk art'".

By the age of 76, Moses' arthritis made embroidery painful. Her sister Celestia suggested painting would be easier for her, which spurred Moses's painting career. Grandma Moses also told reporters that she turned to painting in order to create the postman's Christmas gift, seeing as it "was easier to make than to bake a cake over a hot stove". Paintings also lasted longer than embroidered compositions made of worsted wool, which were susceptible to moths. She was particularly proud of being able to make "something from nothing".

=== Style ===
Moses' embroidery resembled Currier and Ives prints, as did her early paintings. Initially she created simple compositions or copied existing images. In later years, she created complicated, panoramic compositions of rural life. Moses' sketches were often composed of clippings from magazines, postcards, and other printed material. She would pin the clipped images together with sewing needles and paint the resulting collage. As she reused clippings from her inventory, several recurring images are notable in her paintings.

She painted several scenes repeatedly to achieve a better result. Her distinctive style finally emerged when she depicted a personal experience in one of her "Sugaring-Off" paintings. Her craft improved as she continued to work. In her mature work, Moses still relied on clippings without copying them as precisely.

Like the works of Pieter Bruegel the Elder and the Limbourg brothers, Moses' strongest work often ignored linear perspective. She was frequently described as a primitive artist because the lack of formal training is so self-evident in her work.

She painted scenes of rural life from earlier days, which she called "old-timey" New England landscapes. Moses sat quietly to reminisce and imagine until inspiration struck, "then I'll forget everything, everything except how things used to be and how to paint it so people will know how we used to live." Her work often omitted features of modern life, such as tractors and telephone poles.

She was a prolific painter, generating more than 1,500 canvasses in three decades. She charged $3–5 for a painting, depending upon its size. As her fame increased her works were sold for $8–10,000. Her winter paintings are reminiscent of Pieter Bruegel the Elder, although she had never seen his work. A German fan said, "There emanates from her paintings a light-hearted optimism; the world she shows us is beautiful and it is good. You feel at home in all these pictures, and you know their meaning. The unrest and the neurotic insecurity of the present day make us inclined to enjoy the simple and affirmative outlook of Grandma Moses."

=== Initial exhibitions ===
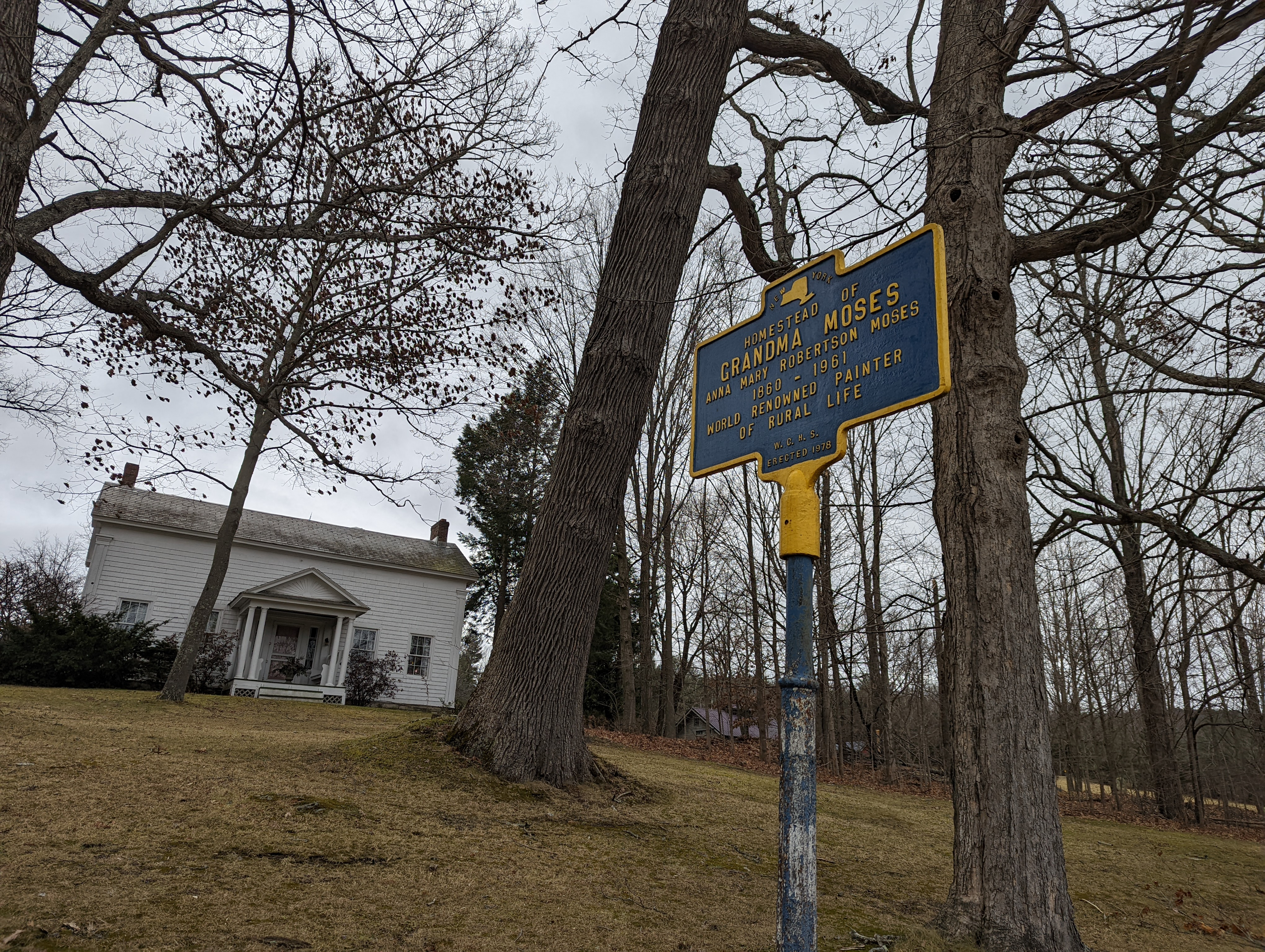
"Mount Nebo", Moses' house in Eagle Bridge, New York from 1905 until her death

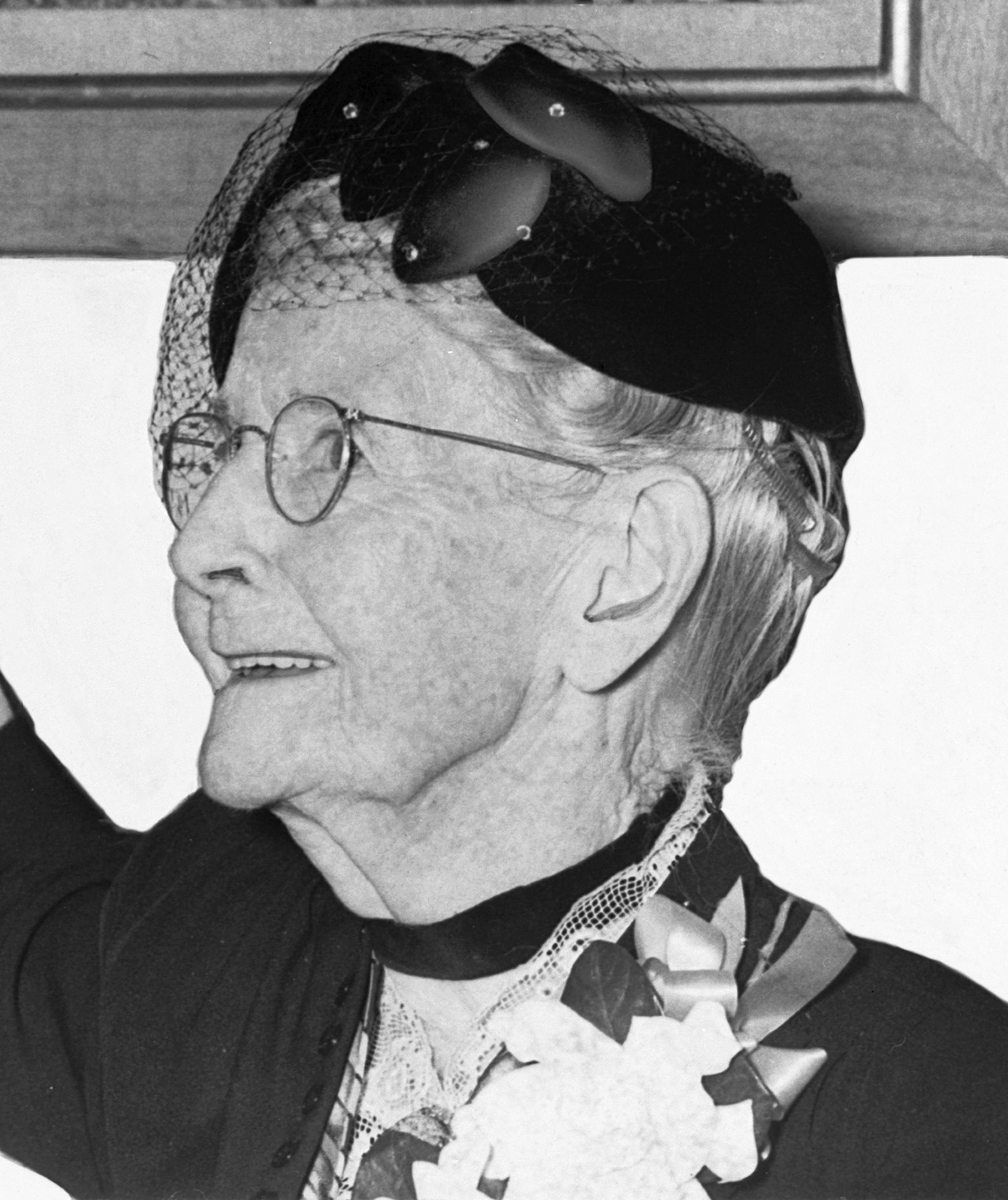
1953 photo of Moses donating her painting Battle of Bennington to Mrs. George Kuhner who accepts it for DAR

During a visit to Hoosick Falls in 1938, art collector Louis J. Caldor saw Moses' paintings in the window of a drug store. He bought them all and went to her house in Eagle Bridge. Caldor supplied Moses with canvas and supplies and encouraged her to keep painting in her own style while he enthusiastically pushed her work in New York City. His effort paid off the following year when Sidney Janis included three Grandma Moses paintings in his "Contemporary Unknown American Painters" exhibition at the Museum of Modern Art.

Moses was one of several folk artists discovered between the two world wars. The Museum of Modern Art was entering its second decade and was a catalyst for the broader appreciation of folk art.

Caldor heard about Otto Kallir's interest in primitive artists and showed him Moses' work. Kallir agreed to hold a solo exhibition at his Galerie St. Etienne in New York. "What a Farm Wife Painted" was well-attended when it opened in October 1940. Kallir showed 34 of Moses' paintings priced from $20–250 and sold three. Moses was too busy to attend, but she accepted Gimbels' invitation to speak at their Thanksgiving forum on November 15. Her art displays included samples of her baked goods and preserves that won Moses prizes at the county fair. Her third solo show in as many months was held at the Whyte Gallery, Washington, D.C. Edith Kallir was commissioned to take several photographs of Moses at the time of this event. These later became famous worldwide in the 1950s in a series of publications in illustrated magazines.

In 1944, Moses was represented by the American British Art Center and the Galerie St. Etienne, which increased her sales. Her paintings were exhibited throughout Europe and the United States over the next 20 years. Otto Kallir established Grandma Moses Properties, Inc. for her. In 1946, Kallir wrote the first book about Moses, Grandma Moses: American Primitive, and he licensed her work to Brundage greeting cards. The 16 million Christmas cards Brundage printed presaged the coming boom. In 1947, Doubleday issued an expanded edition of Kallir's book, and Hallmark Cards took over Brundage's Grandma Moses license.

Grandma Moses's paintings were used to publicize holidays like Thanksgiving, Christmas, and Mother's Day. A 1947 Mother's Day feature in True Confessions noted, "Grandma Moses remains prouder of her preserves than of her paintings, and proudest of all of her four children, eleven grandchildren and four great-grandchildren." During the 1950s, her exhibitions broke attendance records around the world. Art historian Judith Stein wrote, "A cultural icon, the spry, productive nonagenarian was continually cited as an inspiration for housewives, widows and retirees." In addition to greeting cards, Moses' paintings were printed on tiles, fabrics, and ceramics. They were also used to market products, like coffee, lipstick, cigarettes, and cameras.

=== Acclaim ===
In 1950, the National Press Club cited her as one of the five most newsworthy women and the National Association of House Dress Manufacturers honored her as their 1951 Woman of the Year. When she reached 88, Mademoiselle magazine named her a "Young Woman of the Year". She was awarded two honorary doctoral degrees from Russell Sage College in 1949 and the Moore College of Art and Design in 1951.

President Harry S. Truman presented her with the Women's National Press Club trophy Award for outstanding accomplishment in art in 1949. Jerome Hill directed the 1950 documentary of her life, which was nominated for an Academy Award. In 1952, she published her autobiography, My Life's History. In it she said "I look back on my life like a good day's work, it was done and I feel satisfied with it. I was happy and contented, I knew nothing better and made the best out of what life offered. And life is what we make it, always has been, always will be." In 1955, she appeared as a guest on See It Now, a television program hosted by Edward R. Murrow.

== Later years and death ==
She was a member of the Society of Mayflower Descendants and Daughters of the American Revolution. Her 100th birthday was proclaimed "Grandma Moses Day" by New York Governor Nelson Rockefeller. LIFE magazine celebrated her birthday by featuring her on its September 19, 1960, cover. The children's book Grandma Moses Story Book was published in 1961.

Grandma Moses died at age 101 on December 13, 1961, at the Health Center in Hoosick Falls, New York. She is buried there at the Maple Grove Cemetery. President John F. Kennedy memorialized her: "The death of Grandma Moses removed a beloved figure from American life. The directness and vividness of her paintings restored a primitive freshness to our perception of the American scene. Both her work and her life helped our nation renew its pioneer heritage and recall its roots in the countryside and on the frontier. All Americans mourn her loss." After her death, her work was exhibited in several large traveling exhibitions in the United States and abroad.

== Legacy ==
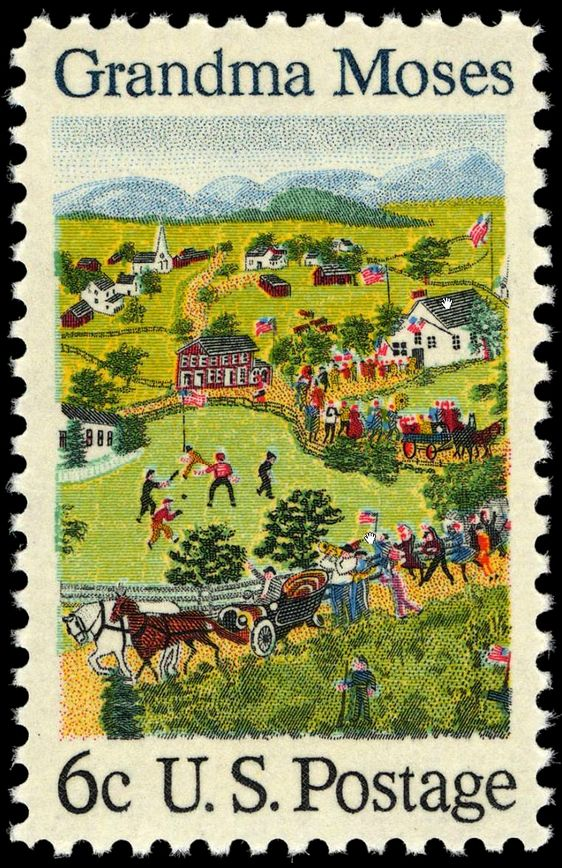
The 1969 U.S. postage stamp honoring Grandma Moses. It shows a detail of her painting July Fourth, which the White House owns.

Norman Rockwell and Grandma Moses were friends who lived across the Vermont–New York state border from each other. Moses lived in Eagle Bridge, New York, and after 1938 the Rockwells had a house in nearby Arlington, Vermont. She appears on the far left edge in the Norman Rockwell painting Christmas Homecoming, which was printed on the December 25, 1948 cover of The Saturday Evening Post.

Otto Kallir of the Galerie St. Etienne gave her painting July Fourth (1951) to the White House as a gift in 1952. The painting also appears on a U.S. commemorative stamp that was issued in Grandma Moses's honor in 1969.

The character Daisy "Granny" Moses (Irene Ryan) on The Beverly Hillbillies, was named as an homage to Grandma Moses, who died shortly before the series began.

The one-rooom school Robertson attended as a young girl was run as a museum for several years before it was transported to Vermont in 1973. It become part of the Bennington Museum, which has the largest collection of her works in the United States.

From March 15 to June 10, 2001, the National Museum of Women in the Arts exhibited Grandma Moses in the 21st Century, which examined "Moses’ artistic development, her place in the art world at the nexus of folk art, fine art, and popular culture, and the phenomenon of her success." The exhibition was sponsored by AARP.

In a 2004 episode of Antiques Roadshow, Moses' 1942 painting The Old Checkered House, 1862 was appraised for $60,000. The painting was purchased in the 1940s for $10. In a 2019 rerun of the episode, Antiques Roadshow estimated the painting was now worth $100,000.

In November 2006, her 1943 work Sugaring Off became her highest-selling work at $1.2 million.

From November 25, 2025 to July 12, 2026, the Smithsonian American Art Museum exhibited Grandma Moses: A Good Day’s Work. The exhibition was shown at the Crystal Bridges Museum of American Art from September 12, 2026 to March 29, 2027. The catalog was edited by Leslie Umberger and Randall R. Griffey.

== Selected works ==
- Sugaring Off (1943). Sold by Christie's in 2006 for US$1,360,000.
- Sugaring Off (1943). Used for a 1947 Christmas Card that became a bestseller for Hallmark Cards.
- Wash Day (1945). Rhode Island School of Design Museum
- A Fire in the Woods (1947). National Gallery of Art.
- The Departure (1951). Philadelphia Museum of Art.
- A Gay Time, March 27, 1953 (1953), oil on board. Sold from the personal collection of Nancy and Ronald Reagan at 668 St. Cloud Road, Bel-Air by Christie's in 2016 for $93,750.
- Autumn in the Berkshires.
- Black Horses (1942).
- Country Fair (1950).
- Bondsville Fair (1945).
- Catching the Thanksgiving Turkey (1943). San Diego Museum of Art.
- Christmas (1958), oil and tempera on pressed wood. Smithsonian American Art Museum.
- Dividing of the Ways (1947), oil and tempera on masonite, Collection American Folk Art Museum, New York
- English Cottage Flower Garden, embroidery.
- Get Out the Sleigh (1960), oil on pressed wood.
- Grandma Moses Goes to the Big City (1946), oil on canvas. Smithsonian American Art Museum.
- Haying Time (1945).
- Home of the Hezekiah King, 1776 (1943). Phoenix Art Museum.
- Home for Thanksgiving (1952).
- McDonnell Farm (1943). The Phillips Collection
- Hoosick Falls in Winter (1944). The Phillips Collection
- Hoosick Falls (1944). Southern Vermont Arts Center.
- Jack 'n Jill.
- July Fourth (1951).
- My Hills of Home (1941). Memorial Art Gallery of the University of Rochester, New York.
- Near Dorset, March 10, 1949 (1949), oil on board. Sold from the personal collection of Nancy and Ronald Reagan at 668 St. Cloud Road, Bel-Air by Christie's in 2016 for $22,500.
- Out for Christmas Trees (1946), private collection.
- Rockabye (1957), Grandma Moses with her grandchildren.
- The Childhood Home of Anna Mary Robertson Moses (1942).
- Thanksgiving Turkey (1943).
- Great Fire (The Burning of Troy in 1862) (1959).
- The Daughter's Homecoming, oil on pressed wood. The Lauren Rogers Museum of Art.
- Checkered House (1943). Formerly IBM art collection.
- The Old Checkered House, 1853 (1946). Nelson-Atkins Museum of Art, Kansas City, Missouri.
- The Old Covered Bridge. The Wadsworth Atheneum Museum of Art, Hartford, Connecticut.
- The Old Oaken Bucket. New York State Historical Association.
- The Old Oaken Bucket (1945 summer version). Hirshhorn Museum and Sculpture Garden.
- The Old Oaken Bucket, The Last (1947 winter version).
- The Red Checkered House.
- Turkey in the Straw (c. 1940). Private collection.
- White Christmas. Private collection; formerly owned by Irving Berlin.
- Winter is Here (1945).
- Bennington (1953), Bennington Museum
- The Battle of Bennington (1953). Bennington Museum.
- Wagon Repair Shop (1960). Bennington Museum.

== Collections ==
Grandma Moses paintings are in the collections of many notable museums:

- Bennington Museum in Bennington, Vermont, holds the largest public collection of Moses's paintings
- Brooklyn Museum, New York City
- Figge Art Museum, Davenport, Iowa
- Hirshhorn Museum and Sculpture Garden, Washington D.C.
- Hyde Collection, Glens Falls, N.Y.
- Lauren Rogers Museum of Art, Laurel, Mississippi
- Maier Museum of Art at Randolph-Macon Woman's College, Virginia
- Memorial Art Gallery of the University of Rochester, New York
- Metropolitan Museum of Art, New York City
- Muscarelle Museum of Art, William & Mary, Williamsburg, Virginia
- National Museum of Women in the Arts, Washington D.C.
- The Phillips Collection, Washington D.C.
- Smithsonian American Art Museum
- University of Iowa Museum of Art, Iowa City
