= Otto Kallir =

Austrian-American historian and author (1894–1978)

Portrait of Otto Kallir at the Age of Twenty-Five, 1919, by Bohuslav Kokoschka

Otto Kallir (born Otto Nirenstein; April 1, 1894 – November 30, 1978) was an Austrian-American art historian, author, publisher, and gallerist. He was awarded the Silbernes Ehrenzeichen für Verdienste um das Land Wien in 1968.

== Austria ==
Nirenstein was born in Vienna, where he attended the Akademisches Gymnasium (Academic High School) from 1904 to 1912. After serving in the Austrian Army during World War I, he studied at the Technische Hochschule Vienna Technical Institute) from 1919 to 1920. However, antisemitism at the Hochschule made it impossible for him to pursue his first ambition, to become an aeronautical engineer, so in 1919, he began a career in publishing by establishing the Verlag Neuer Graphik, a division of the Rikola Verlag.

Among the most important publications of Verlag Neuer Graphik was Das graphische Werk von Egon Schiele, a portfolio containing the first editions of the artist's six etchings and two of his lithographs. In 1923, Nirenstein established the Neue Galerie (still operating, under different ownership, as the Galerie nächst St. Stephan), which opened with the first major posthumous exhibition of Schiele's work. Eventually, Nirenstein became an internationally recognized art dealer, representing Gustav Klimt, Oskar Kokoschka, Egon Schiele and Alfred Kubin. In 1931, he rescued the work of Richard Gerstl from oblivion. Nirenstein also salvaged the estate of Peter Altenberg, creating a permanent gallery installation (later donated to the Wien Museum) featuring the contents of the poet's former hotel room. Additionally, the Neue Galerie exhibited contemporary Austrian artists such as Herbert Böckl, Anton Faistauer, Gerhard Frankl, Ludwig Heinrich Jungnickel, Oskar Laske and Otto Rudolf Schatz, as well as nineteenth-century Austrian masters like Anton Romako and Ferdinand Georg Waldmüller. At a time when Austrians were still relatively unfamiliar with European modernism, Nirenstein mounted one-man shows of work by Lovis Corinth, Edvard Munch, Auguste Renoir, Paul Signac and Vincent van Gogh.

In 1922, Nirenstein married the Baroness Franziska von Löwenstein-Scharffeneck (1899-1992). The following year, to celebrate the birth of their son, John Kallir (d. 2022), he changed the name of his publishing house to Johannes Presse. Like the Verlag Neuer Graphik, the Johannes Presse specialized in limited-edition books and portfolios containing original prints. A daughter, Evamarie Kallir, was born in 1925 (d. 2022).

In 1928, Nirenstein collaborated with the Hagenbund artists' association to mount a major exhibition commemorating the tenth anniversary of Egon Schiele's death. Paintings were exhibited at the Hagenbund, works on paper at the Neue Galerie. Two years later, Nirenstein published the first catalogue raisonné of Schiele's paintings, Egon Schiele: Persönlichkeit und Werk.

Also in 1930, he received his doctorate in art history from the University of Vienna. In 1933 Otto Nirenstein legally changed his name to Kallir, adopting a name that had been in his family for many generations.

In 1937 he helped Frederich Welz organize a Waldmüller exhibition in Salzburg. After World War II, Kallir refused to have anything to do with Welz, whose dealings during the Nazi period were notorious.

== Emigration ==
After the Nazis annexed Austria in 1938, Kallir faced imminent persecution, not only because he was Jewish, but also because he had actively supported the Schuschnigg government. Compelled to emigrate, he sold the Neue Galerie to his secretary Vita Künstler, who was not Jewish. This was a rare example of a "friendly Aryanization." Künstler preserved the gallery as best she could and voluntarily returned it to Kallir after World War II. Because the modern artists represented by the Neue Galerie were not subject to Austria's export laws in 1938, and most were in any case considered "degenerate" by the Nazis, Kallir was able to bring a significant inventory with him into exile. He, his wife and their two children initially settled in Lucerne, Switzerland. But the Swiss would not give him a work permit, and so he traveled on to Paris. Here he founded the Galerie St. Etienne, named after Vienna's central landmark, the Cathedral of St. Stephen. The French refused to admit the rest of the Kallir family, however, and so they had to find a country that would take them all. In 1939, they emigrated to the United States, bringing a significant portion of the gallery's inventory.

In the same year, Kallir established the New York Galerie St. Etienne, where he introduced Austrian and German expressionist art to the United States.

== The Austrian-American League ==
In Paris, Kallir had naturally associated with other Austrian refugees, and he became friendly with Otto von Habsburg, the pretender to the Austrian throne. Almost immediately after arriving in New York, Kallir joined the board of the Austrian-American League, one of several semi-political émigré groups. He was appointed chairman in 1940. The League organized "artistic evenings" and helped recent arrivals adapt to life in the US. As chairman of the League, Kallir endeavored to secure US visas and affidavits for persecuted Austrians, eventually arranging for the safe passage of about 80 refugees. Kallir was also concerned that, if the US entered the war, Austrians as enemy aliens might have their assets confiscated or be restricted in their ability to move freely. In 1941, he convinced Otto von Habsburg, who had recently arrived in America, to accompany him to Washington D.C., where they met with the Attorney General, Francis Biddle. They convinced Biddle that Austrians were victims, not accomplices, of Hitler. In 1942, after the US had entered the war, Austria was officially recognized as a neutral country, an action that had the desired effect for Austrian residents of the US, but also unforeseen consequences in Austria after the war.

== Otto Kallir and Willibald Plöchl ==
Willibald Plöchl was the founder of the Free Austrian National Council, a rival of the Austrian-American League. He held Kallir responsible for the differences that had developed between him and Otto von Habsburg. This led members of Plöchl's group to denounce Kallir to the FBI as a "former agent of Hitler and Mussolini" who had dealt with looted art. The unfounded accusation caused Kallir to suffer a near-fatal heart attack on December 12, 1942. After a long convalescence, he resigned from the Austrian-American League and thereafter ceased any involvement in politics. The Washington Daily News, which had printed an article about Kallir's alleged Nazi connections, issued a formal apology. The FBI closed its investigation with a statement from J. Edgar Hoover confirming that the affair had been instigated by the jealousy of a rival political group and had no basis in fact. On April 14, 1942, Otto von Habsburg wrote to the OSS (Office of Strategic Services, predecessor of the CIA): "Kallir was attacked from many sides. It appears those attacks were unjustified. Kallir is honest, but very incompetent in politics."

== United States ==
In 1939, when Kallir established the Galerie St. Etienne in New York, the Austrian modernists had very little international recognition or market value. At Egon Schiele’s first American exhibition, mounted by the gallery in 1941, drawings were priced at $20, watercolors at $60; none sold. Through repeated showings, sales and gifts to museums, Kallir gradually established the reputations not just of Schiele, but also of Gustav Klimt, Oskar Kokoschka, and Alfred Kubin. The Galerie St. Etienne organized the first American one-person shows of such artists as Erich Heckel (1955), Klimt (1959), Kokoschka (1940), and Kubin (1941), Paula Modersohn-Becker (1958). During the 1940s, when works by the Austrian masters were almost impossible to sell, Kallir achieved a major success with the "discovery" of the self-taught octogenarian painter Anna Mary Robertson Moses. Known worldwide as "Grandma" Moses, she was one of the most famous artists of the Cold-War years, and the most successful female painter of her time.

Kallir's approach relied heavily on scholarship and cooperation with museums. In 1960, he collaborated with Thomas Messer to organize the first American museum exhibition of Schiele's work. It opened at Boston's Institute of Contemporary Art (of which Messer was then director) and traveled to five additional venues. In 1965, after Messer had been appointed Director of the Guggenheim Museum in New York, Kallir convinced him to mount a major Klimt/Schiele show. In 1966, Kallir issued an updated edition of his Schiele catalogue raisonné, Egon Schiele: Oeuvre Catalogue of the Paintings, which was followed, in 1970, by a catalogue raisonné of the artist's prints, Egon Schiele: The Graphic Work. In recognition of the Guggenheim’s support, Kallir donated Schiele’s “Portrait of an Old Man (Johann Harms)” in 1969. Kallir’s other major donations included Klimt’s “Pear Tree” (given to the Fogg Art Museum in 1956) and “Baby” (given to the National Gallery of Art in 1978).

He also authored catalogues raisonnés documenting the oeuvres of Grandma Moses (1973) and Richard Gerstl (1974).

Upon Kallir's death in New York in 1978, the Galerie St. Etienne was taken over by his long-time associate, Hildegard Bachert, and his granddaughter, Jane Kallir. In 2020, the gallery ceased commercial operations and became an art advisory. Its archives and library were transferred to the Kallir Research Institute, a foundation established in 2017 to continue Otto Kallir’s scholarly activities.

The Neue Galerie in Vienna, run by various directors after the war, was formally dissolved in 1975. Its archives were donated to the Österreichische Galerie im Belvedere. Otto Kallir's family donated his collection of historical autographs to the Wienbibliothek im Rathaus in 2008. Additional archival materials can be found at the Leo Baeck Institute in New York.

== Postwar Restitution ==
During his first years in America, Kallir was inclined to see himself and his fellow refugees as victims of Nazism, but after the war he was forced to acknowledge the collusion of many who had remained behind. Given his connections in the exile community and his knowledge of prewar art collections, Kallir made a special effort to assist collectors in recovering art that had been stolen during the Hitler years. In most cases, he met with fierce resistance on the part of the Austrian museums and legal establishment. However, in 1998, Kallir's records facilitated the seizure of a stolen Schiele painting, Portrait of Wally, on loan from Austria to the Museum of Modern Art. The case caused Austria to revamp its restitution laws, permitting the return of many looted artworks.

Among these was Edvard Munch’s “Summer Night on the Beach,” which was restituted to the granddaughter of Alma Mahler Werfel in 2006. Kallir had unsuccessfully attempted to assist Mahler Werfel in reclaiming the painting after the war, and as with the Schiele, his records proved instrumental in the later recovery effort.

== Art Dealing During The Nazi Era ==
Art historian Jonathan Petropoulos wrote that Kallir's activities during the Nazi era inhabit a "gray zone. In 2007, letters were discovered detailing Kallir's sale of a Waldmüller painting via an agent to Joseph Goebbels. Kallir's defenders say that Kallir was in the process of fleeing Austria following the Anschluss, that he made no money on the transaction and that subsequently wrote the owner: “This entire episode has been extremely unpleasant for me.”

Restitution claims for artworks handled by Kallir have had mixed results. In a case concerning Oscar Kokoschka's Two Nudes, in which the Museum of Fine Arts in Boston sued the claimant, Claudia Seger-Thomschitz, the judge ruled in favor of the museum.

In the case of Schiele's watercolor “Woman Hiding Her Face” (1912), the judge ruled in favor of the heirs of Holocaust victim, Fritz Grünbaum. Kallir had purchased "Woman Hiding Her Face" from Eberhard Kornfeld in 1956 and sold it the following year for $300.The work had changed hands many times and increased greatly in value by the time Richard Nagy bought it in 2013. Nagy's attempts to appeal the ruling were unsuccessful.

In an earlier case involving another Schiele, “Seated Woman with Bent Left Leg” (1917), also purchased from Kornfeld in 1956, the judge ruled in favor of the owner, David Bakalar, who had filed for summary judgement. The case turned on the defense of “laches,” an "equitable doctrine asserted by Bakalar that bars title actions in which there has been a lengthy delay in filing a claim". The judge stated, “After more than two years of discovery in connection with this litigation and the benefit of archival research unavailable in 1956, Defendants have not produced any concrete evidence that the Nazis looted the Drawing or that it was otherwise taken from Grünbaum.”

== Awards ==
• 1968: Silbernes Ehrenzeichen für Verdienste um das Land Wien

== Publications ==
- Otto Kallir, Egon Schiele: Oeuvre Catalogue of the Paintings (Crown Publishers, New York: 1966).
- Otto Kallir. Egon Schiele: The Graphic Work (Crown, New York: 1970).
- Otto Kallir, Grandma Moses (Abrams: New York: 1973).
- Otto Kallir, Richard Gerstl (1883–1908): Beitrāge zur Dokumentation seines Lebens und Werkes (Counsel Press: New York, 1974).
- Jane Kallir, Saved From Europe (Galerie St. Etienne, New York: 1999).
- Jane Kallir, Austria's Expressionism (Rizzoli, New York: 1981).
- Otto Kallir: Ein Wegbereiter Österreichischer Kunst (exhibition catalogue with texts by Hans Bisanz, Jane Kallir and Vita Maria Künstler; Historisches Museum der Stadt Wien, Vienna: 1986)

== See also ==
- German Expressionism
- The Holocaust in Austria
- Eberhard Kornfeld
- Fritz Grünbaum
