= Bennington Museum =

Museum in Bennington, Vermont, USA

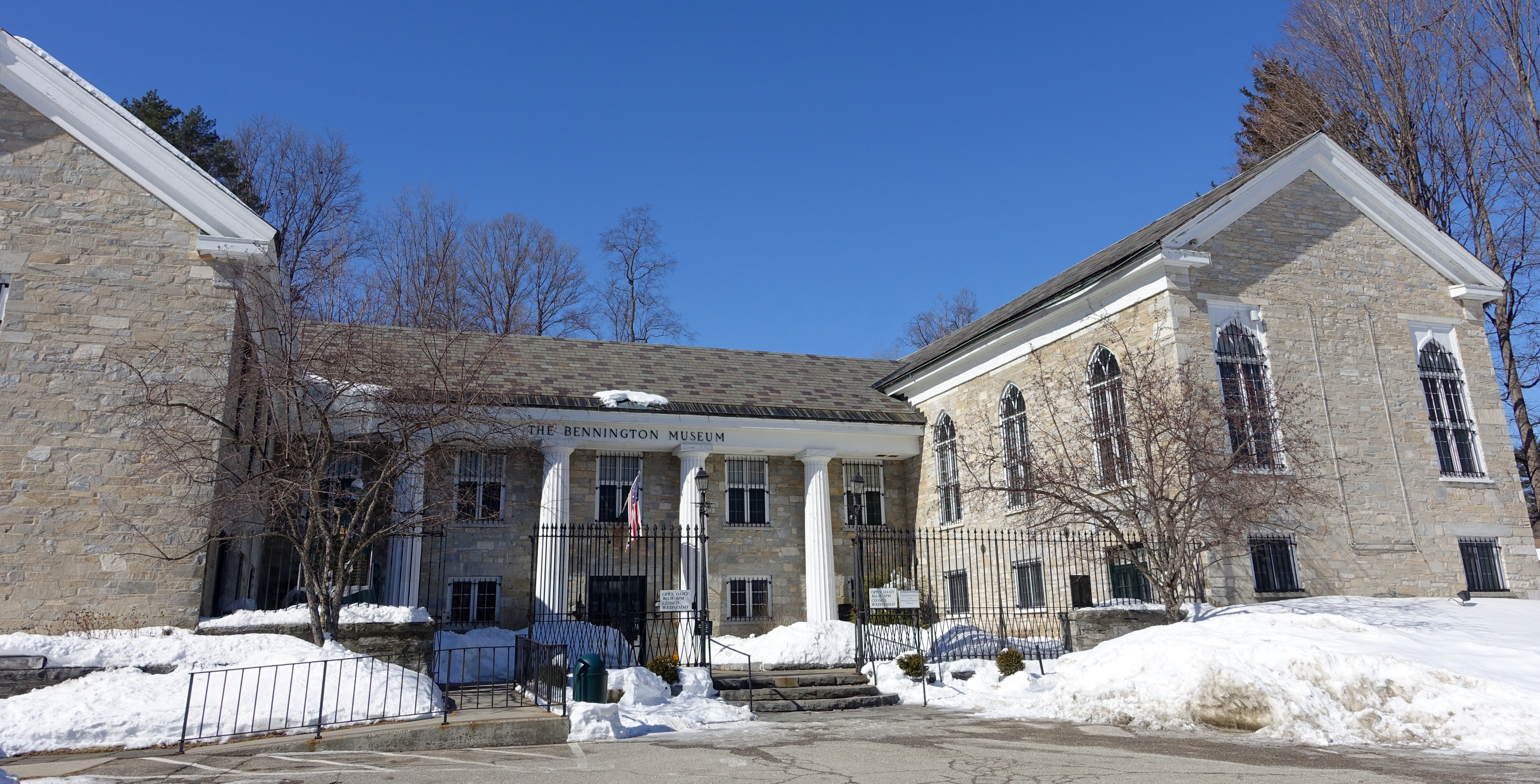
- Established: 1928
- Location: 75 Main Street; Bennington, Vermont, United States
- Coordinates: 42.8831°N 73.2100°W
- Type: Art, history
- Website: www.benningtonmuseum.org

The Bennington Museum is an accredited museum with notable collections of art and regional history. It is located at 75 Main Street, Bennington, Vermont, USA.

The museum's history dates to 1852 when the Bennington Historical Association was first incorporated. In 1923 the association acquired a former church, which it renovated and opened to the public in 1928 as the Bennington Historical Museum. The building was subsequently expanded in 1938, 1960, 1974, and 1999. In 1938 its name was revised to the Bennington Historical Museum and Art Gallery to reflect its holdings of artwork, and in 1954 it was renamed the Bennington Museum. The collections have a special focus on Vermont and adjacent areas of New York and Massachusetts. In 1972 the schoolhouse attended by Grandma Moses was moved to the grounds and included as part of the museum. It also includes a genealogy and history research library.

Key aspects of the museum's permanent collections include:

- Grandma Moses Gallery - the largest public collection of paintings by noted local artist "Grandma Moses", Anna Mary Robertson Moses (1860-1961).
- Fine Art Gallery - including works by Ralph Earl, Oliver Tarbell Eddy, Erastus Salisbury Field, Ammi Phillips, William Morris Hunt, Frederick MacMonnies, Rockwell Kent, and Simon Moselsio.
- Bennington Modernism - avant-garde artworks from the early 1950s through the mid-1970s by artists including Pat Adams, Willard Boepple, Anthony Caro, Paul Feeley, Helen Frankenthaler, Patricia Johanson, Vincent Longo, Kenneth Noland, Jules Olitski, Dan Shapiro, David Smith, and Tony Smith.
- Gilded Age Vermont - focused on Bennington from the mid 1800s to mid 1900s. Exhibits include paintings by William Morris Hunt, Frederick MacMonnies’ portrait painting of May Suydam Palmer, and glass and metal works by Lewis Comfort Tiffany, as well as a parlor organ manufactured by the Estey Organ Company and the Martin Wasp, a luxury automobile made in Bennington in 1924-25.
- Military Gallery - focusing on the Revolutionary War's Battle of Bennington, and including an exhibit of Vermont-made firearms from 1760 to 1900.
- Bennington Pottery - featuring pieces by Norton Pottery (1785-1894), United States Pottery Company (1847-1858), Fenton pottery, and redware.
- Textile Gallery - the Bennington flag, one of the oldest “stars and stripes” in existence, a Green Mountain Boys flag belonging to John Stark, the Jane Stickle Quilt, and other textiles.

The museum also displays temporary exhibits on a wide variety of subjects.
