= Galerie St. Etienne =

Art gallery in the United States

- Location of Galerie St. Etienne in New York City
- Established: 1939
- Location: 24 W 57th St #802, New York
- Coordinates: 40.7634°N 73.9756°W
- Directors: Jane Kallir, Hildegard Bachert
- Website: gseart.com

Galerie St. Etienne is a New York art gallery specializing in Austrian and German Expressionism, established in Vienna in 1939 by Otto Kallir (originally Otto Nirenstein). In 1923, Kallir founded the Neue Galerie in Vienna. Forced to leave Austria after the 1938 Nazi invasion, Kallir established his gallery in Paris as the Galerie St. Etienne, named after the Neue Galerie's location near Vienna's Cathedral of St. Stephen. In 1939, Kallir and his family left France for the United States, moving the Galerie St. Etienne to New York City. The gallery still exists, run by Otto Kallir's granddaughter Jane at 24 West 57th Street.

== Vienna ==
After antisemitism at Vienna's Technische Hochschule forced Kallir to abandon his dream of becoming an aeronautical engineer, he decided instead to pursue a longstanding interest in art. In 1919, he established a publishing concern, the Verlag Neur Graphik, on the premises of the Galerie Würthle, a leading art gallery in Vienna. In 1923, Kallir opened his own gallery, the Neue Galerie, for which the New York museum of Austrian and German art and design was later named. The Vienna gallery opened with the first major posthumous exhibition of Egon Schiele's work, and continued to represent artists such as Gustav Klimt, Oskar Kokoschka, Egon Schiele, Richard Gerstl and Alfred Kubin. In addition to the work of Austrian artists, Kallir brought international figures like Vincent van Gogh, Paul Signac, Auguste Renoir and Paul Cézanne to the gallery. Kallir also published limited edition prints by artists like Max Beckmann, Johannes Itten, Oskar Kokoschka and Alfred Kubin, and most notably a portfolio of Egon Schiele's etchings and lithographs, Das Graphische Werk von Egon Schiele, continuing to utilize the publishing skills he developed early in his career.

== The Anschluss and its aftermath ==
After the Nazi annexation of Austria in 1938, Kallir faced persecution not only for being Jewish, but for supporting the Schuschnigg government. He sold the Neue Galerie to his secretary, Vita Kūnstler, who preserved the gallery as best she could and voluntarily returned it to Kallir after World War II. Because work by the modern artists the gallery represented was not subject to Austria's export laws and was in most cases, considered by the Nazis to be "degenerate", Kallir was able to bring a significant portion of the gallery's inventory with him into exile. Kallir and his family initially emigrated to Lucerne, Switzerland, but, because he was not granted a Swiss work permit, Kallir traveled to Paris, where he founded the Galerie St. Etienne. Since the French would not admit his wife and two children, the Kallir family emigrated to the United States in 1939.

== America ==
After establishing New York's Galerie St. Etienne in 1939, Kallir helped introduce Expressionism to the United States. The gallery hosted the first American exhibitions of numerous important Austrian and German modernists in the 1940s and 1950s, including Gustav Klimt, Oskar Kokoschka, Alfred Kubin, Paula Modersohn-Becker, Käthe Kollwitz, Vally Wieselthier and Egon Schiele. Through shows, sales, scholarship, and gifts to museums such as the Solomon R. Guggenheim Museum, the Museum of Modern Art, and the Minneapolis Institute of Arts, Kallir and the Galerie St. Etienne established a place in the American eye for Austrian and German expressionism.

The Galerie St. Etienne began representing the work of American folk artists as Kallir attempted to capture the identity of his newfound homeland. In 1940, the Galerie St. Etienne hosted the first one-woman exhibition of the work of Anna Mary Robertson ("Grandma") Moses.

The Galerie St. Etienne gained the exclusive representation of Grandma Moses, who became one of the most renowned American artists of the immediate postwar era, in large part thanks to a relationship cultivated by Hildegard Bachert, who joined the gallery's staff in 1940 and later became its codirector.

In 1941, the gallery exhibited Navajo and Hopi weavings, as Kallir aimed to exhibit art reflective of American identity.

The Galerie St. Etienne maintained a long tradition of outstanding scholarship, beginning with the first catalogue raisonné of Egon Schiele's paintings, Egon Schiele: Persönlichkeit und Werke, published by Otto Kallir in 1930. Kallir published an update to this book in 1966, and a catalogue raisonné of the artist's prints, Egon Schiele: The Graphic Work, in 1970. In addition, he authored catalogues raisonnés documenting the work of Grandma Moses (1973) and Richard Gerstl (1974).

== Postwar Restitution ==
Given his connections in the exile community and his knowledge of prewar art collections, Otto Kallir made a special effort to assist collectors in recovering art that had been stolen during the Hitler years. At the time, his efforts often met with fierce resistance. However, in 1998, Kallir's records facilitated the seizure of a stolen Schiele painting, Portrait of Wally, on loan from Austria to the Museum of Modern Art. The case caused Austria to revamp its restitution laws, permitting the return of many looted artworks.

The increased attention paid to Holocaust-era looting since 1998 has caused some of Kallir's early transactions to be questioned. However, no evidence of wrongdoing on his part has ever been found. In a case concerning Oscar Kokoschka's Two Nudes, owned by the Museum of Fine Arts in Boston, the judge ruled against the claimant, Claudia Seger-Thomschitz. Similarly, in a case involving a Schiele, Seated Woman with Bent Left Leg (1917), alleged to have been stolen from Fritz Grünbaum (a Holocaust victim), the judge ruled in favor of the owner, David Bakalar. The judge stated, "After more than two years of discovery in connection with this litigation. . . .Defendants have not produced any concrete evidence that the Nazis looted the Drawing or that it was otherwise taken from Grünbaum."

== 1978–2020 ==
Upon Kallir's death in 1978, the Galerie St. Etienne was taken over by long-time associate, Hildegard Bachert, and Kallir's granddaughter, Jane Kallir.

Under their direction, the gallery began a program of museum-scale loan exhibitions, a practice then uncommon among commercial galleries. Lenders included the Museum of Fine Arts, Boston, the Art Institute of Chicago, the Solomon R. Guggenheim Museum, the Metropolitan Museum of Art, the Museum of Modern Art, the Whitney Museum of American Art, the Hirshhorn Museum and Sculpture Garden, the Phillips Collection, the Kunsthalle Bremen, the Lenbachhaus in Munich, the National Gallery of Canada in Ottawa, the Wien Museum and the Belvedere in Vienna, plus many private collectors.

Jane Kallir continued the gallery's scholarly tradition, publishing over 20 books on such subjects as Grandma Moses, Gustav Klimt, Egon Schiele, the Wiener Werkstätte and Austrian Expressionism (see Publications for further information). Her catalogue raisonné Egon Schiele: The Complete Works, was released in 1990 and expanded in 1998. A digital update is available at egonschieleonline.org.

In addition to writing short texts to accompany each of the Galerie St. Etienne's exhibitions, Jane Kallir became known for her annual "Art Market Reports"

While continuing to represent Grandma Moses, starting in the 1980s, the Galerie St. Etienne expanded its roster of self-taught artists to include Henry Darger, John Kane, Ilija Bosilj, Michel Nedjar and the Artists of the Gugging.

The gallery also expanded its representation of Expressionists, with Germans such as Max Beckmann, Otto Dix, George Grosz, Erich Heckel and Ernst Ludwig Kirchner regularly appearing alongside Austrians such as Klimt, Kokoschka, Kubin and Schiele.

A major exception to the gallery's historical orientation was its representation of contemporary British-born artist Sue Coe, whose oeuvre shares close formal and thematic connections with the work of Käthe Kollwitz. From 2007–2020, the gallery also represented the estate of the American artist Leonard Baskin.

The gallery was an early member of the Art Dealers Association of America and participated regularly in major art fairs, including the Winter Antiques Show, the ADAA Art Show, and the IFPDA Print Fair (all in New York) and Art Basel (in Basel, Switzerland).

Both Kallir and Bachert received various awards for their contributions to Austrian and German cultural preservation, and the gallery has been honored for its contributions to the Bennington Museum, which is known for its Grandma Moses collection.

Hildegard Bachert died in 2019 at the age of 98.

In 2020, the Galerie St. Etienne ceased commercial operations and became an art advisory. Its archives and library were transferred to the Kallir Research Institute, a foundation established in 2017. The KRI continues to provide authentications for works attributed to Egon Schiele and Grandma Moses, and cooperates with internationally recognized scholars on pertinent research projects.

== Publications ==
The following publications are associated with the gallery:

- Egon Schiele: Oeuvre Catalogue of the Paintings (Crown Publishers, New York: 1966)
- Egon Schiele; The Graphic Work (Crown, New York: 1970)
- Grandma Moses (Abrams: New York: 1973)
- Richard Gerstl (1883–1908): Beitrāge zur Dokumentation seines Lebens und Werkes (Counsel Press: New York, 1974)
- Gustav Klimt/Egon Schiele (New York: Crown Publishers, 1980)
- Austria's Expressionism (New York: Rizzoli International, 1981)
- The Folk Art Tradition: Naive Painting in Europe and the United States (New York: The Viking Press, 1981)
- Grandma Moses: The Artist Behind the Myth (New York: Clarkson N. Potter, 1982)
- Arnold Schoenberg's Vienna (New York: Rizzoli International, 1984)
- Viennese Design and the Wiener Werkstätte (New York: George Braziller, Inc., 1986)
- Gustav Klimt: 25 Masterworks (New York: Harry N. Abrams, Inc., 1989)
- Egon Schiele: The Complete Works – Including a Biography and a Catalogue Raisonné (New York: Harry N. Abrams, Inc., 1990; expanded edition 1998)
- Egon Schiele (New York: Harry N. Abrams, Inc. 1994)
- Egon Schiele: 27 Masterworks (New York: Harry N. Abrams, Inc., 1996)
- Grandma Moses: 25 Masterworks (New York: Harry N. Abrams, Inc., 1997)
- Grandma Moses in the 21st Century (New Haven: Yale University Press, 2001
- The Essential Grandma Moses (New York: Harry N. Abrams, Inc., 2001)
- Egon Schiele: Life and Work (New York: Harry N. Abrams, Inc., 2003)
- Egon Schiele: Drawings and Watercolors (London: Thames & Hudson, 2003)
- Egon Schiele: Love and Death (Amsterdam: Van Gogh Museum & Hatje Cantz: 2005)
- Egon Schiele: Erotica (Paris: Éditions Anthèse: 2007)
- Gustav Klimt: In Search of the Total Artwork (Munich: Prestel Verlag, 2009)
- Egon Schiele: Self-Portraits and Portraits (Munich: Prestel Verlag, 2011)
- Egon Schiele's Women (Munich: Prestel Verlag, 2012)
- The Women of Klimt, Schiele and Kokoschka (Munich: Prestel Verlag, 2015)
