= List of airline codes (T) =

This is a list of all airline codes. The table lists the IATA airline designators, the ICAO airline designators and the airline call signs (telephony designator). Historical assignments are also included for completeness.

== Codes ==
Airline codes
IATA	ICAO	Airline	Call sign	Country	Comments
9L	TOW	AirTanker	TOWLINE	United Kingdom	Operating the four reserve de-militarised RAF Voyager for commercial revenue
1L	OSY	Open Skies Consultative Commission	OPEN SKIES	United States	
DT	DTA	TAAG Angola Airlines	DTA	Angola	
	IRF	TA-Air Airline	TA-AIR	Iran	
	TBI	TAB Express International	TAB INTERNATIONAL	United States	
	TBM	Taban Air Lines	TABAN AIR	Iran	
	THO	TACA De Honduras	LEMPIRA	Honduras	
VR	TCV	TACV	CABOVERDE	Cape Verde	
	TDC	Tadair	TADAIR	Spain	Ceased operation in 2003
	TES	Taespejo Portugal LDA	Tesaban	Portugal	
	HET	TAF Helicopters	HELITAF	Spain	
	TSD	TAF-Linhas Aéreas	TAFI	Brazil	
	SBT	Taftan Airlines	TAFTAN	Iran	
	FPG	TAG Aviation	TAG AVIATION	Switzerland	
	TGM	TAG Aviation Espana	TAG ESPANA	Spain	
	VIP	Tag Aviation UK	SOVEREIGN	United Kingdom	
	TAG	TAG Aviation USA	TAG U-S	United States	
	FBO	TAG Farnborough Airport		United Kingdom	
TI	TWI	Tailwind Airlines	TAILWIND	Turkey	
	TIN	Taino Tours	TAINO	Dominican Republic	
	TFB	Tair Airways	ROYAL TEE-AIR	Philippines	
	TJK	Tajikair	TAJIKAIR	Tajikistan	
	TZK	Tajikistan International Airlines	TAJIKISTAN	Tajikistan	
	TKE	Take Air Line	ISLAND BIRD	France	
	JEL	Tal Air Charters	JETEL	Canada	
	TAL	Talair	TALAIR	Papua New Guinea	
	TFF	Talon Air	TALON FLIGHT	United States	
PZ	LAP	TAM Mercosur	PARAGUAYA	Paraguay	
EQ	TAE	TAME	TAME	Ecuador	Transporte Aéreos Militares Ecuatorianos
	TMI	Tamir Airways	TAMIRWAYS	Israel	
QT	TPA	TAMPA	TAMPA	Colombia	
	TNR	Tanana Air Services	TAN AIR	United States	
TQ	TDM	Tandem Aero	TANDEM	Moldova	
	HTO	Tango Bravo	HELI TANGO	France	
TP	TAP	TAP Portugal	AIR PORTUGAL	Portugal	
	UTM	TAPC Aviatrans Aircompany	AVIATAPS	Uzbekistan	
	TPS	TAPSA Transportes Aéreos Petroleros	TAPSA	Argentina	
K3	TQN	Taquan Air Services	TAQUAN	United States	
	THC	Tar Heel Aviation	TARHEEL	United States	
	TPL	TAR Interpilot	INTERPILOT	Mauritania	
	IRR	Tara Air Line	TARAIR	Iran	
	TTH	Tarhan Tower Airlines		Turkey	
RO	ROT	Tarom	TAROM	Romania	
	RMS	Tas Aviation	TASS AIR	United States	
	CTP	Tashkent Aircraft Production Corporation	CORTAS	Uzbekistan	
HJ	TMN	Tasman Cargo Airlines	TASMAN	Australia	
SF	DTH	Tassili Airlines	TASSILI AIR	Algeria	
	PGS	Tauranga Aer Club		New Zealand	
T6	TVR	Tavrey Airlines	TAVREY	Ukraine	
	TQE	Taxair Mexiqienses	TAXAIR	Mexico	
	TXL	Taxi Aéreo Cozatl	TAXI COZATL	Mexico	
	TXM	Taxi Aéreo de México	TAXIMEX	Mexico	
	TUO	Taxi Aéreo Turístico	TURISTICO	Mexico	
	XNR	Taxi Aero Del Norte	TAXI NORTE	Mexico	
	TDV	Taxi Aero Nacional Del Evora	TAXI EVORA	Mexico	
	TRF	Taxi Air Fret	TAXI JET	France	
	VRC	Taxi de Veracruz	VERACRUZ	Mexico	
	TXR	Taxirey	TAXIREY	Mexico	
	TPR	Taxis Aéreos De Parral	TAXIS PARRAL	Mexico	
	TXO	Taxis Aéreos de Sinaloa	TAXIS SINALOA	Mexico	
	TNE	Taxis Aéreos del Noroeste	TAXINOROESTE	Mexico	
	TPF	Taxis Aéreos del Pacífico	TAXIPACIFICO	Mexico	
	TMH	Taxis Turisticos Marakame	TAXIMARAKAME	Mexico	
	TYF	Tayflite	TAYFLITE	United Kingdom	
	TFY	Tayside Aviation	TAYSIDE	United Kingdom	
L6	VNZ	Tbilaviamsheni	TBILAVIA	Georgia	
	RRY	Tbilisi Aviation University	AIRFERRY	Georgia	
	TCD	Tchad Airlines	TCHADLINES	Chad	
	TIM	TEAM Linhas Aéreas	TEAM BRASIL	Brazil	
L9	TLW	Teamline Air	Teamline	Austria	
	TEM	Tech-Mont Helicopter Company	TECHMONT	Slovakia	
	TEF	Tecnicas Fotograficas	TECFOTO	Spain	
	TBN	Teebah Airlines	TEEBAH	Sierra Leone	
	THR	Tehran Airline	TEHRAN AIR	Iran	
U8	CYF	Tel Aviv Air	TUS AIR	Germany	defunct
	TCM	Teledyne Continental Motors	TELEDYNE	United States	
	TLX	Telesis Transair	TELESIS	United States	
	TEL	Telford Aviation	TELFORD	United States	
	TDE	Tellavia / Flight One	TELLURIDE	United States	
	DOT	Telnic Limited	DOT TEL	United Kingdom	
	TEH	Tempelhof Airways	TEMPELHOF	United States	
	TMS	Temsco Helicopters	TEMSCO	United States	
	TNL	Tengeriyn Ulaach Shine	SKY HORSE	Mongolia	
	TEB	Tenir Airlines	TENIR AIR	Kyrgyzstan	
	TNG	Tennessee Air National Guard 164th Airlift Group		United States	
	TEN	Tennessee Airways	TENNESSEE	United States	
	TET	Tepavia-Trans Airlines	TEPAVIA	Moldova	
	TER	Territorial Airlines	TERRI-AIRE	United States	
	TIS	Tesis	TESIS	Russia	
	TXZ	Tex Star Air Freight	TEX STAR	United States	
	TXA	Texair Charter	OKAY AIR	United States	
	TXT	Texas Air Charters	TEXAS CHARTER	United States	Group One
	TXS	Texas Airlines	TEXAIR	United States	
	CWT	Texas Airways	TEXAS AIRWAYS	United States	
	TXN	Texas National Airlines	TEXAS NATIONAL	United States	
K9	TEZ	TezJet	Tezjet	Kyrgyzstan	Started in 2014
	TGC	TG Aviation	THANET	United Kingdom	
T2	TCG	Thai Air Cargo	THAI CARGO	Thailand	
FD	AIQ	Thai AirAsia	THAI ASIA	Thailand	
XJ	TAX	Thai AirAsia X	EXPRESS WING	Thailand	
TG	THA	Thai Airways International	THAI	Thailand	
	TSL	Thai Aviation Services	THAI AVIATION	Thailand	
TXZ		Thai Express Air	EXPRESS AIR	Thailand	
	TFH	Thai Flying Helicopter Service	THAI HELICOPTER	Thailand	
	TFT	Thai Flying Service	THAI FLYING	Thailand	
	THG	Thai Global Airline	THAI GLOBAL	Thailand	
	THJ	Thai Jet Intergroup	THAI JET	Thailand	
SL	TLM	Thai Lion Mentari	MENTARI	Thailand	Associate of Lion Air
	TPV	Thai Pacific Airlines Business	THAI PACIFIC	Thailand	
9I	LLR	Thai Sky Airlines	THAI SKY AIR	Thailand	
WE	THD	Thai Smile Airways	THAI SMILE	Thailand	
T9	TSX	Thai Star Airlines	THAI STAR	Thailand	
VZ	TVJ	Thai Vietjet Air	THAIVIET JET	Thailand	
2H		Thalys		Belgium	Not an airline (train). Used for codesharing
	GFN	The 955 Preservation Group	GRIFFON	United Kingdom	
	LEG	The Army Aviation Heritage Foundation	LEGACY	United States	
	LCC	The Lancair Company	LANCAIR	United States	
HQ	TCW	Thomas Cook Airlines	KESTREL	Belgium	Defunct
MT	TCX	Thomas Cook Airlines	KESTREL	United Kingdom	
	IHS	Thryluthjonustan		Iceland	
	THU	Thunder Airlines	AIR THUNDER	Canada	
	TBD	Thunderbird Tours	ORCA	Canada	
	BLI	Thyssen Krupp AG	BLUELINE	Germany	
GS	GCR	Tianjin Airlines	BO HAI	China	
3P	TNM	Tiara Air	TIARA	Aruba	
	TBA	Tibet Airlines	TIBET	China	
	TIK	Tic Air	TICAIR	Australia	
	TJN	Tien-Shan	NERON	Kazakhstan	
TT	TGG	Tigerair Australia	TIGGOZ	Australia	Previously TGW, callsign GO CAT
	MDL	Tigerair Mandala	MANDALA	Indonesia	defunct, original airline code RI
TR	TGW	Tigerair Singapore	GO CAT	Singapore	Merged with Scoot
IT	TTW	Tigerair Taiwan	SMART CAT	Taiwan	
	MOH	Tigerfly	MOTH	United Kingdom	
	TKC	Tikal Jets Airlines	TIKAL	Guatemala	
	TMR	Timberline Air	TIMBER	Canada	
	TIE	Time Air	TIME AIR	Czech Republic	
	BOX	Tiphook PLC	BOX	United Kingdom	defunct
	TVI	Tiramavia	TIRAMAVIA	Moldova	
ZT	AWC	Titan Airways	ZAP	United Kingdom	
	TYJ	TJS Malta Ltd.	TYROLMALTA	Malta	
	TSR	TJS San Marino S.r.L.	SAN MARINO	San Marino	
	TLS	TLC Air	TEALSY	United States	
	TMM	TMC Airlines	WILLOW RUN	United States	
3V	TAY	TNT Airways	QUALITY	Belgium	
	NTR	TNT International Aviation	NITRO	United Kingdom	
	TBX	Tobago Express	TABEX	Trinidad and Tobago	
7T	TOB	Tobruk Air	TOBRUK AIR	Libya	
	TOJ	TOJ Airlines	TOJ AIRLINE	Tajikistan	
TI	TOL	Tol-Air Services	TOL AIR	United States	
	TMK	Tomahawk Airways	TOMAHAWK	United States	
	TOP	Top Air	AIR TOP	Indonesia	
	CHE	Top Flight Air Service	CHECK AIR	United States	
	TLY	Top Fly	TOPFLY	Spain	
	LKW	Top Sky International	TOPINTER	Indonesia	
	TPD	Top Speed	TOP SPEED	Austria	
	TTL	Total Linhas Aéreas	TOTAL	Brazil	
	TOT	Totavia		Canada	Aviation Information Services
	THE	Toumai Air Tchad	TOUMAI AIR	Chad	
	THF	Touraine Helicoptere	TOURAINE HELICO	France	
	~~TOW~~	Tower Air	~~TEE AIR~~	~~United States~~	Ceased operations
	TOY	Toyota Canada	TOYOTA	Canada	
	TGE	Trabajos Aéreos	TASA	Spain	
	AIM	Trabajos Aéreos Murcianos	PIJO	Spain	
	TVH	Trabajos Aéreos Vascongados	TRAVASA	Spain	
	TDR	Trade Air	TRADEAIR	Croatia	
TJ	GPD	Tradewind Aviation	GOODSPEED	United States	
	TDX	Tradewinds Airlines	TRADEWINDS EXPRESS	United States	Wrangler Aviation
	TWL	Tradewinds Aviation	TRADEWINDS CANADA	Canada	
	JCH	Trading Air Cargo	TRADING CARGO	Mauritania	
	TDO	TRADO	TRADO	Dominican Republic	Transporte Aéreo Dominicano
	TRG	TRAGSA (Medios Aéreos)		Spain	
	HBA	Trail Lake Flying Service	HARBOR AIR	United States	
	TMQ	TRAM	TRAM AIR	Mauritania	
	TMX	Tramon Air	TRAMON	South Africa	
	TRR	Tramson Limited	TRAMSON	Sudan	
	MUI	Trans Air	MAUI	United States	
	TRC	Trans Air Charter	TRACKER	United States	
	TWW	Trans Air Welwitchia	WELWITCHIA	Angola	
	TNB	Trans Air-Benin	TRANS-BENIN	Benin	
	RTM	Trans Am Compania	AERO TRANSAM	Ecuador	
	CLR	Trans America	CLINTON AIRWAYS	United States	
	TVA	Trans America Airlines	TRANS-AMERICA	United States	
	TPU	Trans American Airlines (Trans Am)	TRANS PERU	Peru	
	TRT	Trans Arabian Air Transport	TRANS ARABIAN	Sudan	
	SRT	Trans Asian Airlines	TRASER	Kazakhstan	
	TLL	Trans Atlantic Airlines	ATLANTIC LEONE	Sierra Leone	
	LTA	Trans Atlantis	LANTRA	Canada	
CB*		Trans Caribbean Air Export Import		United States	
	TCC	Trans Continental Airlines	TRANSCAL	Sudan	
	TCN	Trans Continental Airlines	TRANSCON	United States	
	TRJ	Trans Euro Air	HIGH TIDE	United Kingdom	
	TGY	Trans Guyana Airways	TRANS GUYANA	Guyana	
	THZ	Trans Helicoptere Service	LYON HELIJET	France	
	TIA	Trans International Airlines	TRANS INTERNATIONAL	United States	
	BAP	Trans International Express Aviation	BIG APPLE	United States	
	TRD	Trans Island Air	TRANS ISLAND	Barbados	
	SWL	Trans Jet Airways	TRANSJET	Sweden	
TL	TMA	Trans Mediterranean Airlines	TANGO LIMA	Lebanon	
	TMT	Trans Midwest Airlines	TRANS MIDWEST	United States	
	TNW	Trans Nation Airways	TRANS-NATION	Ethiopia	
	TNT	Trans North Turbo Air	TRANS NORTH	Canada	
	REC	Trans Reco	TRANS-RECO	Mauritania	
	SBJ	Trans Sahara Air	TRANS SAHARA	Nigeria	
	TSM	Trans Sayegh Airport Services		Lebanon	
AX	LOF	Trans States Airlines	WATERSKI	United States	
TW	TWA	Trans World Airlines	TWA	United States	
	RBD	Trans World Express	RED BIRD	United States	
UN	TSO	Transaero Airlines	TRANSOVIET	Russia	
	TNF	Transafricaine	TRANSFAS	Burkina Faso	
	TCG	Transafricaine Air Cargo	AFRICARGO	Burkina Faso	
	TFK	Transafrik International		São Tomé and Príncipe	
	TSA	Transair France	AIRTRAF	France	
	TGX	Transair Gabon	TRANSGABON	Gabon	
	TNI	Transair International Linhas Aéreas	TRANSINTER	United States	
	TSN	Trans-Air Services	AIR TRANS	Nigeria	
	TSG	Trans-Air-Congo	TRANS-CONGO	Republic of the Congo	
	KTS	Transair-Gyraintiee	KOTAIR	Russia	
	GJB	Trans-Air-Link	SKY TRUCK	United States	
	TWM	Transairways		Mozambique	
	UTT	Transarabian Transportation Services	ARABIAN TRANSPORT	Uganda	
GE	TNA	TransAsia Airways		Taiwan	defunct
	AUC	Transaustralian Air Express	AUSCARGO	Australia	Defunct
	VEN	Transaven	TRANSAVEN AIRLINE	Venezuela	
TO	TVF	Transavia France	FRANCE SOLEIL	France	
HV	TRA	Transavia Holland	TRANSAVIA	Netherlands	
	KTB	Transaviabaltika	TRANSBALTIKA	Lithuania	
AL	TXC	TransAVIAexport Airlines	TRANSEXPORT	Belarus	
	FNV	Transaviaservice	TRANSAVIASERVICE	Georgia	
	TVO	Transavio	TRANS-BALLERIO	Italy	
TR	TBA	Transbrasil	TRANSBRASIL	Brazil	defunct
	TIW	Transcarga Intl Airways	TIACA	Venezuela	
	TCE	Trans-Colorado Airlines	TRANS-COLORADO	United States	
	TCH	Transcontinental Air	TRANS GULF	Bahrain	
	KRA	Transcontinental Airlines	REGATA	Kazakhstan	
	TCT	Transcontinental Sur	TRANS-CONT	Uruguay	
	TCP	Transcorp Airways	TRANSCORP	United Kingdom	
UE	TEP	Transeuropean Airlines	TRANSEURLINE	Russia	
	TFA	Trans-Florida Airlines	TRANS FLORIDA	United States	
	TCU	Transglobal Airways Corporation	TRANSGLOBAL	Philippines	
	TXE	Transilvania Express	TRANSAIR EXPRESS	Romania	
	KCA	Trans-Kiev	TRANS-KIEV	Ukraine	
	TLA	Translift Airways	TRANSLIFT	Ireland	
	TMD	Transmandu	TRANSMANDU	Venezuela	
	TMD	Transmed Airlines		Egypt	
T9	TRZ	TransMeridian Airlines	TRANS-MERIDIAN	United States	Defunct
8B	TNU	TransNusa	TRANSNUSA	Indonesia	
TH	RMY	Raya Airways	TRANSMILE	Malaysia	
	TNV	Transnorthern	TRANSNORTHERN	United States	
	TPP	Transpac Express	TRANS EXPRESS	Australia	
	PCW	Trans-Pacific Orient Airways	PACIFIC ORIENT	Philippines	
	TPM	Transpaís Aéreo	TRANSPAIS	Mexico	
	TNP	Transped Aviation	TRANSPED	Austria	
	TRM	Transport Aerien de Mauritanie	SOTRANS	Mauritania	
	TLF	Transport Africa	TRANS-LEONE	Sierra Leone	
	TGO	Transport Canada	TRANSPORT	Canada	
	TFI	Transport Facilitators		United States	
	TQR	Transportación Aérea De Querétaro	TRANSQUERETARO	Mexico	
	MCT	Transportación Aérea Del Mar De Cortés	TRANS CORTES	Mexico	
	TPN	Transportación Aérea del Norte	AEREA DELNORTE	Mexico	
	TTR	Transportaciones Y Servicios Aéreos	TRANSPORTACIONES	Mexico	
	TSI	Transport'air	TRANSPORTAIR	France	
	TCB	Transporte Aereo De Colombia	AERO COLOMBIA	Colombia	
	TAD	Transporte Aéreo Dominicano	TRANS DOMINICAN	Dominican Republic	
	TZE	Transporte Aéreo Ernesto Saenz	TRANSPORTE SAENZ	Mexico	
	TTS	Transporte Aéreo Técnico Ejecutivo	TECNICO	Mexico	
	MGM	Transporte Aero MGM	AERO EMM-GEE-EMM	Mexico	
	TMZ	Transporte Amazonair	TRANS AMAZON	Venezuela	
	TCB	Transporte del Caribe	TRANSCARIBE	Colombia	
	EAR	Transporte Ejecutivo Aéreo	EJECUTIVO-AEREO	Mexico	
	TPT	Transportes Aéreo del Sureste	TASSA	Mexico	
	MPO	Transportes Aéreos Amparo	AMPARO	Mexico	
	BOL	Transportes Aéreos Bolivianos	BOL	Bolivia	
	TDI	Transportes Aéreos de Ixtlán	TRANSIXTLAN	Mexico	
	TPX	Transportes Aéreos De Xalapa	TRANSXALAPA	Mexico	
	TMY	Transportes Aéreos del Mundo Maya	MUNDO MAYA	Mexico	
	TFO	Transportes Aéreos del Pacífico	TRANSPORTES PACIFICO	Mexico	
	DCL	Transportes Aéreos Don Carlos	DON CARLOS	Chile	
	ROU	Transportes Aéreos I. R. Crusoe	ROBINSON CRUSOE	Chile	
	TSP	Transportes Aéreos Inter	TRANSPO-INTER	Guatemala	
	MXQ	Transportes Aéreos Mexiquenses	MEXIQUENSES	Mexico	
TX	TAN	Transportes Aéreos Nacionales		Honduras	Defunct
	ELV	Transportes Aéreos Nacionales De Selva Tans	AEREOS SELVA	Peru	
	TPG	Transportes Aéreos Pegaso	TRANSPEGASO	Mexico	
	TGI	Transportes Aéreos Regionales	TRANSPORTE REGIONAL	Mexico	
	SRF	Transportes Aéreos San Rafael	SAN RAFEAL	Chile	
	RRT	Transportes Aéreos Sierra	SIERRA ALTA	Mexico	
	SEI	Transportes Aéreos Sierra Madre	TRANSPORTE SIERRA	Mexico	
	TAU	Transportes Aéreos Tauro	TRANSTAURO	Mexico	
	TPZ	Transportes La Paz	TRANSPAZ	Mexico	
OF	TML	Transports et Travaux Aériens de Madagascar	TAM AIRLINE	Madagascar	
	TPY	Trans-Provincial Airlines	TRANS PROVINCIAL	Canada	
	TTC	Transteco	TRANSTECO	Angola	
	UTN	Trans-Ulgii	TRANS-ULGII	Mongolia	defunct
	TWE	Transwede Airways	TRANSWEDE	Sweden	
9T	ABS	Transwest Air	ATHABASKA	Canada	
	TRW	Transwestern Airlines of Utah	TRANS-WEST	United States	
	TSW	Transwings	SWISSTRANS	Switzerland	
	TST	TRAST	TRAST	Kazakhstan	
S5	TSJ	Trast Aero	TRAST AERO	Kyrgyzstan	
	TSK	Trast Aero	TOMSK-AVIA	Kyrgyzstan	
	TAX	Travel Air	TRAVELAIR	United States	
	TIC	Travel International Air Charters	TRAVEL INTERNATIONAL	Zambia	
	TMC	Travel Management Company	TRAIL BLAZER	United States	
	TLV	Travelair	PAJAROS	Uruguay	
1E		Travelsky Technology		China	
	TDA	Trend Aviation	TREND AIR	United States	
	TNX	Trener Ltd	TRAINER	Hungary	
	TRU	Triangle Airline (Uganda)	TRI AIR	Uganda	
	SWD	Trifly	SAWBLADE	United States	
	TGN	Trigana Air Service	TRIGANA	Indonesia	
GY	TMG	Tri-MG Intra Asia Airlines	TRILINES	Indonesia	
	TBH	Trinity Air Bahamas		Bahamas	
T4	TIB	TRIP Linhas Aéreas	TRIP	Brazil	IATA code 8R changed to T4 (2010)
	CLU	Triple Alpha	CAROLUS	Germany	
	TTP	Triple O Aviation	MIGHTY WING	Nigeria	
	TSY	Tristar Air	TRIPLE STAR	Egypt	
	TRY	Tristar Airlines	TRISTAR AIR	United States	
	TSS	Tri-State Aero	TRI-STATE	United States	
	DRC	Triton Airlines	TRITON AIR	Canada	
	TSV	Tropair Airservices	TROPIC	United Kingdom	
PM	TOS	Tropic Air	TROPISER	Belize	
	TRO	Tropic Airlines-Air Molokai	MOLOKAI	United States	
M7	TBG	Tropical Airways		Haiti	
	TKX	Tropical International Airways	TROPEXPRESS	Saint Kitts and Nevis	
	TCA	Tropican Air Services	TROPICANA	Egypt	
	TYG	Trygg-Flyg	TRYGG	Sweden	
TZ	TDS	Tsaradia	TSARADIA	Madagascar	
	PSS	TSSKB-Progress	PROGRESS	Russia	
	TTA	TTA - Sociedade de Transporte e Trabalho Aéreo	KANIMANBO	Mozambique	
	TBR	Tubelair	TUBELAIR	Tunisia	
BY	TOM	TUI Airways	TOM JET	United Kingdom	Formerly "TOMSON"
TB	JAF	TUI fly Belgium	BEAUTY	Belgium	
X3	TUI	TUI fly Deutschland	TUI JET	Germany	
OR	TFL	TUI fly Netherlands	ORANGE	Netherlands	
6B	BLX	TUI fly Nordic	BLUESCAN	Sweden	
TD	TLP	Tulip Air	TULIPAIR	Netherlands	
	TUL	Tulpar Air	URSAL	Russia	
	TUX	Tulpar Air Service	TULPA	Kazakhstan	
	TUZ	Tuna Aero	TUNA	Sweden	
UG	TUX	Tuninter		Tunisia	
TU	TAR	Tunisair	TUNAIR	Tunisia	
	TAJ	Tunisavia	TUNISAVIA	Tunisia	
3T	URN	Turan Air	TURAN	Azerbaijan	
	TBC	Turbine Air Cargo UK		United Kingdom	
	TAC	Turbot Air Cargo	TURBOT	Senegal	
	TRQ	Turdus Airways	HUNTER	Netherlands	Defunct, ICAO code in use by another airline
	TUC	Turismo Aéreo de Chile	TURICHILE	Chile	
	THK	Turk Hava Kurumu Hava Taksi Isletmesi	HUR KUS	Turkey	
	THS	Turkish Aerospace Industries	TUSAS	Turkey	
	HVK	Turkish Air Force	TURKISH AIRFORCE	Turkey	
TK	THY	Turkish Airlines	TURKISH	Turkey	
	TRK	Turkish Airlines General Aviation	TURKISH REPUBLIC	Turkey	
T5	TUA	Turkmenistan Airlines	TURKMENISTAN	Turkmenistan	
	TLT	Turtle Airways	TURTLE	Fiji	
	USB	Tusheti	TUSHETI	Georgia	
TW	TWB	T'way Air	TWAYAIR	Republic of Korea	
	TWO	Twente Airlines	COLIBRI	Netherlands	
	TCY	Twin Cities Air Service	TWIN CITY	United States	
T7	TJT	Twin Jet	TWINJET	France	
	TNY	Twin Town Leasing Company	TWINCAL	United States	
	TWJ	Twinjet Aircraft Sales		United Kingdom	
	TYW	Tyrol Air Ambulance	TYROL AMBULANCE	Austria	
VO	TYR	Tyrolean Airways	TYROLEAN	Austria	Renamed from Austrian Arrows
	TJS	Tyrolean Jet Services	TYROLJET	Austria	
	TUM	Tyumenspecavia	TUMTEL	Russia	
VNX	TKK	flyADVANCED	TARKA	United States	Aero Ways Inc. flyADVANCED

== IATA Traffic Conference Areas ==
The International Air Transport Association (IATA) divides the world into three areas called the Traffic Conference Areas (TCAs) for air travel purposes. These areas are used to define geographical boundaries for fare construction and other industry-related practices:

- Traffic Conference Area 1 (TC1) – this area includes the Americas, encompassing North America (the Caribbean, Central America, and Northern America) and South America.
- Traffic Conference Area 2 (TC2) – this area includes the EMEA region, encompassing Europe, the Middle East, and Africa (North Africa and Sub-Saharan Africa).
- Traffic Conference Area 3 (TC3) – this area includes the Asia–Pacific region, encompassing the rest of Asia (Central Asia, East Asia, North Asia, South Asia, and Southeast Asia) and Oceania.

Essentially, TC1 covers the "New World", while TC2 and TC3 together cover the "Old World" (Africa-Eurasia) and the "Land Down Under".

== See also ==
- IATA airport code
- ICAO airport code
