= Tower Airline =

Tower Airline may refer to:

- Tower Air, 1983-2000
- Tarhan Tower Airlines, also defunct
