= Thr =

THR or Thr may refer to:

== Aviation ==
- Mehrabad International Airport (IATA airport code: THR), an international airport serving Tehran, the capital city of Iran
- Tehran Airline (ICAO airline code: THR), see List of airline codes (T)
- thrust (THR), see List of aviation, aerospace and aeronautical abbreviations
- threshold (THR), see List of aviation, aerospace and aeronautical abbreviations

== Biochemistry, biology, and medicine ==
- Target heart rate, a desired range of heart rate reached during aerobic exercise
- Threonine (Thr), an amino acid that is used in the biosynthesis of proteins
- Thrombin (Thr), a serine protease
- Tobacco harm reduction
- Total hip replacement

== Media ==
- The Hollywood Reporter, a Los-Angeles–based magazine and website (founded 1930)
- Times-Herald Record, a New York daily newspaper (founded 1956)
- THR.fm, a Malaysian radio station (aired 1994–2005)
- WTHR, a television station in Indiana, US (first aired 1957)

== Other uses ==
- HTC–Highroad, a road cycling team (1989-2011; OCI team code: THR)
- Rana Tharu language, spoken in Nepal (ISO 639: thr)
- THR (soldering)
- Yamaha THR, a series of guitar amps

== See also ==
- Thrr (disambiguation)
