= Loz =

LOZ or Loz may refer to:

- The Legend of Zelda, a video game series
  - The Legend of Zelda (video game), the first game in the series
  - The Legend of Zelda (TV series), an animated TV series loosely based on the video games
  - The Legend of Zelda (film), an upcoming film based on the video game series
- Loz, a character from the film Final Fantasy VII: Advent Children
- London-Corbin Airport in London, Kentucky (IATA airport code)
- The ISO 639-2 and ISO 639-3 language code for the Lozi language
- "Big Loz", nickname of English strongman Laurence Shahlaei
