= XNR =

XNR may refer to:

- Plymouth XNR, a concept car
- Kangri language (ISO 639-3 language code xnr), an Indo-Aryan language of north India
- Taxi Aero Del Norte (ICAO airline code XNR), a Mexican airline; see List of airline codes (T)
- Xenopus nodal related protein or gene (Xnr) found in the nodal signaling pathway
