= Nan Phelps =

- Born: Nannie Dorothea Hinkle; August 25, 1904; London, Kentucky; United States
- Died: January 17, 1990 (aged 85); Hamilton, Ohio; United States
- Education: Self-taught
- Known for: Painting
- Notable work: Grandma Weaver; Winter in Old Kentucky; Boulder Canyon Falls
- Movement: American Folk Art

Nan Phelps (née Hinkle; August 25, 1904 – January 17, 1990), was an American folk artist from London, Kentucky. Phelps' work has often been compared to that of the more famous Grandma Moses in both style and subject matter.

== Biography ==
Phelps was born in Lily, Laurel County, Kentucky, the second child of Baptist preacher John Hinkle and Lula Hinkle (née Weaver). Phelps paternal grandfather William Hinkle was of Dutch descent. At a very young age, Phelps demonstrated an unusual interest in nature. She spent countless hours studying rocks, flowers, plants, streams, clouds, and small animals. The gift of a nickel box of crayons at age five unleashed a talent and unrelenting love for drawing. Phelps branched off into painting during her teen years when fortuitously a teacher provided her with some watercolors and paper. In 1922 Phelps moved from Kentucky to Hamilton, Ohio. Through the difficult depression years, a divorce, remarriage and rearing a family of five children, she continued her painting. It was during this time that Phelps began primarily using oil paints. In the 1930s Phelps' work was exhibited at the nearby Cincinnati Art Museum and in local arts and crafts shows. As the winner of a local talent show in 1940, Phelps won a scholarship to attend the Art Academy of Cincinnati.

In the 1950s Phelps traveled to New York City with a sample of her work in order to increase her exposure in the art world. During this visit, Phelps' work gained the attention of Otto Kallir, the founder of the Galerie St. Etienne. Kallir is most widely known for discovering Grandma Moses and promoting her work. This began a long relationship between Phelps and the Galerie St. Etienne that continues today, through the children of Phelps and current Galerie St. Etienne directors Hildegard Bachert and Jane Kallir. After this trip, Phelps paintings became more widely known in the folk art world, leading to her work being exhibited in various museums. In the 1980s, Phelps' work came to the attention of New York gallery owner and scholar of American folk art, Jay Johnson. Johnson proceeded to acquire and display Phelps' paintings in many exhibits, culminating in a solo exhibition of her work at the Jay Johnson America's Folk Heritage Gallery. In 1989 Phelps exhibited two paintings in Daimaru Museum Kyoto, Japan along with other folk artists including Grandma Moses and Horace Pippin. As part of the Friends of Art and Preservation in Embassies (FAPE), Phelps' paintings have been displayed in United States Embassies in West Germany, Finland, and Denmark. Phelps' painting Riverfront Stadium: Phillies and Reds was featured prominently on the front cover of A People and a Nation and during the "Feelin' in Love" segment of David Letterman's Second Holiday Film Festival which aired in 1986.

Phelps died in early 1990 at age 85. She continued to paint up until her admittance to the hospital in late 1989. During the short hospital stay before her death, Phelps requested her paint brushes in order to paint, though she was not physically able. Some of the last words she spoke as she looked out the hospital window were "I wish I could paint those clouds".

== Paintings ==
Phelps was a prolific painter. She worked continuously for over sixty years, producing in excess of 1000 paintings. Though her formal training consisted only of a correspondence course taken during the 1920s and a short stay at the Art Academy of Cincinnati, Phelps rejected the term "naïve" in describing her work. Her choice of subjects was broad and included landscapes, still life, tropical beaches, western scenes, and historic figures. She also painted traditional folk art subjects, such as scenes from rural American life, many of these paintings were inspired by her own childhood on the family farm. Phelps also painted many portraits. Her portraits primarily consisted of family members, especially her grandchildren. Some are reminiscent of the work of itinerant 19th century portrait painters, but the similarities are superficial. While they share the romantic charm characteristic of the Limner portraits, Phelps' subjects were set in context that demonstrates an intimacy that the oft-repeated backdrops of those earlier paintings lacked. According to the curator of the Kentucky Folk Art Center Adrian Swain,

Her subject matter was eclectic, including landscapes, still life, western scenes and historic figures. Some of these paintings are reminiscent of the work of itinerant 19th century portrait painters. Yet the number and variety of setting in which she depicted various specific family members underscores Nan Phelps' need to paint, her need to tell the story of her life while improvising the context, often humorous, in which she set her human subjects. She had a natural sense of form, color and design.

Phelps paintings not only varied in subject matter they also varied greatly in size and media. She produced paintings that ranged in size from 1" by 1" miniatures to 6' by 17' murals. Additionally, Phelps would paint not only upon canvas but also on natural objects such as seashells and rocks. Phelps works continue to be displayed in galleries, churches, museums, embassies, and private residences throughout the world.

== Selected works ==
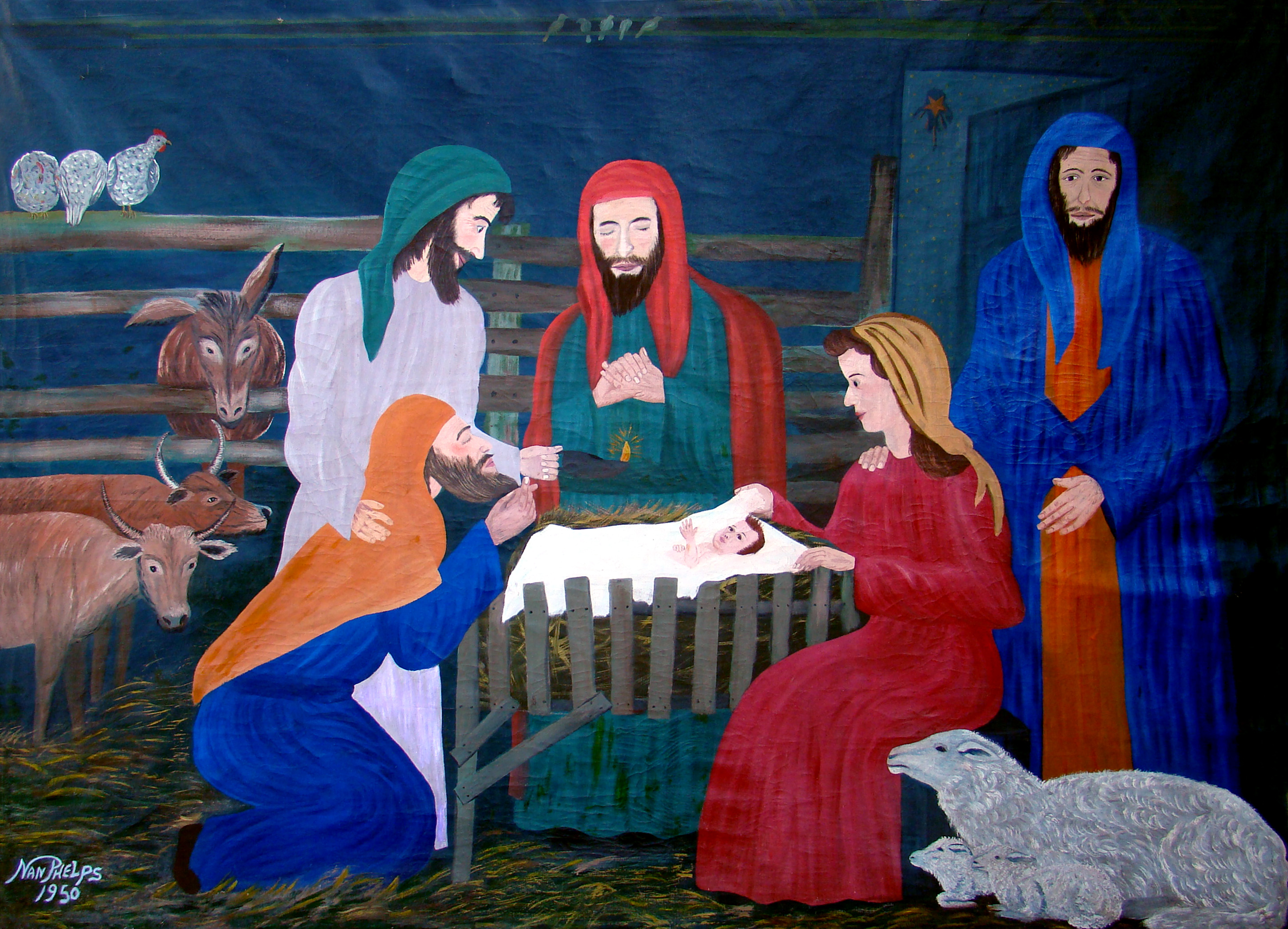
The Birth of Baby Jesus (1950)

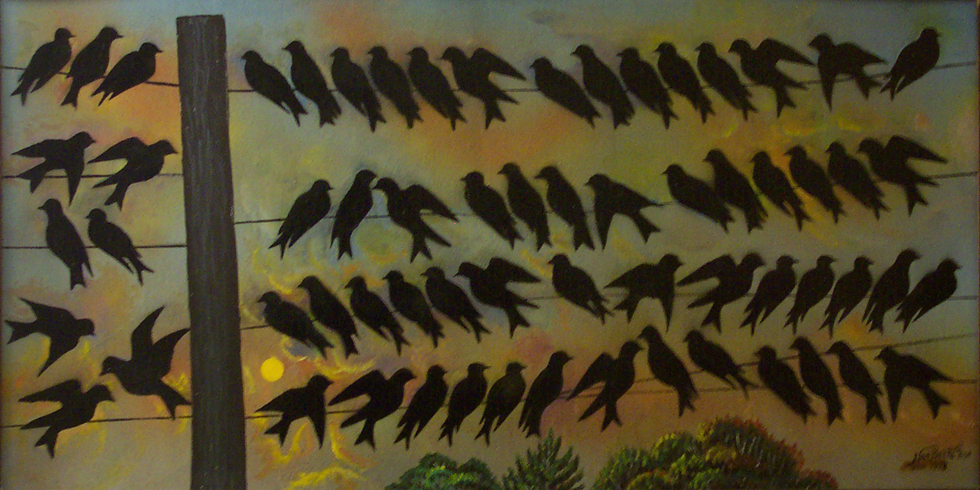
Birds on a Wire (1978)

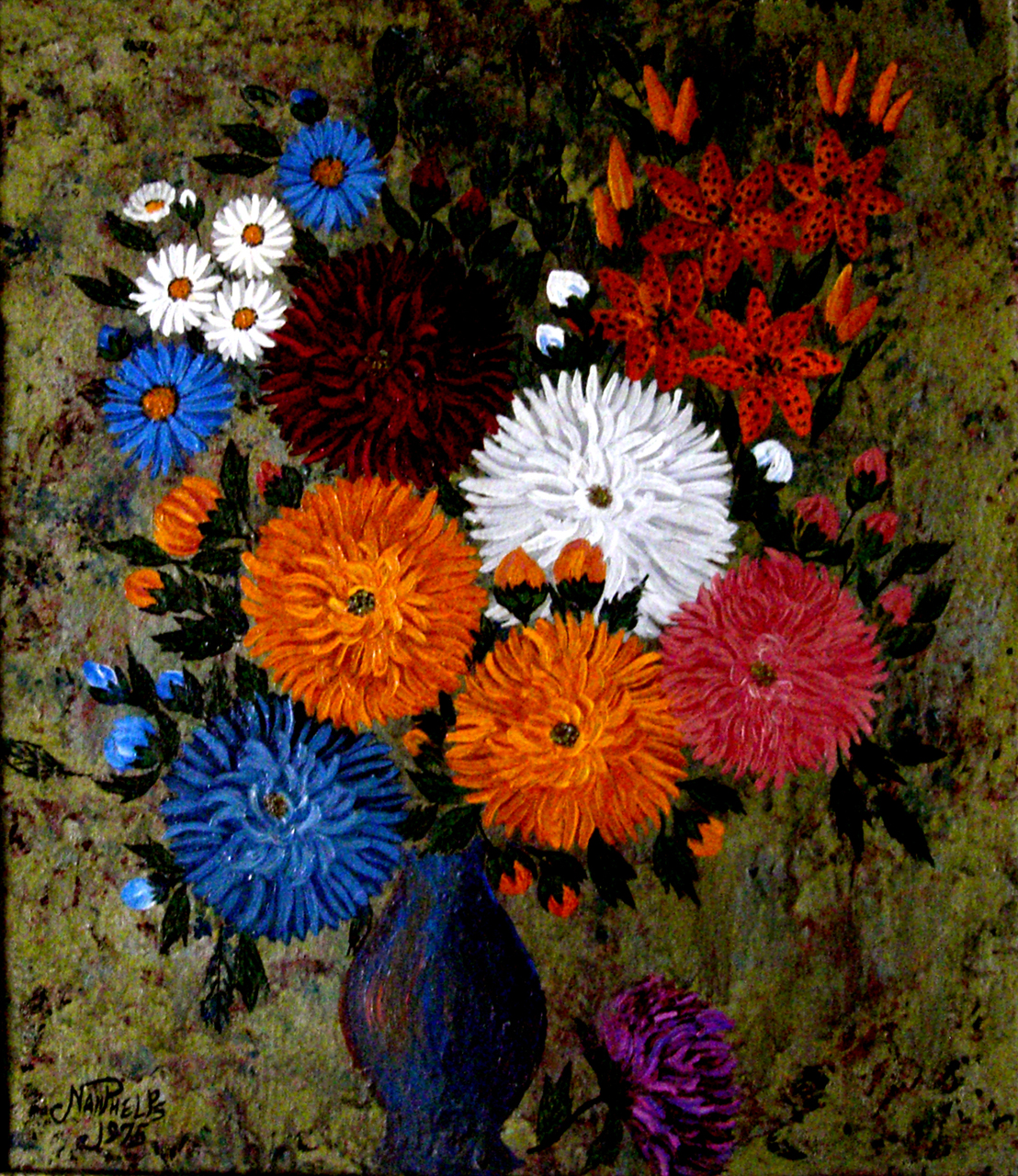
Flowers in a Blue Vase (1975)

== Exhibitions and collections ==
=== Selected exhibitions (Solo) ===
- March 7 – June 13, 1999 – Kentucky Folk Art Center, Morehead, Kentucky. The Paintings of Nan Phelps.
- November 6 – November 20 – Jay Johnson America's Folk Heritage Gallery. Nan Phelps.

=== Selected exhibitions (Group) ===
- September 15–30, 1970 – Galerie Paula Insel, New York, New York
- January 1–25, 1974 – The Copley Society of Art, Boston, Massachusetts.
- June 8–9, 1975 – Lynn Kottler Galleries, New York, New York
- January 1982 – Galerie St. Etienne, New York, New York
- March 29 – April 11, 1989 - Daimaru Museum, Kyoto, Japan
- May 13 – September 1990 – Cincinnati Art Museum, Cincinnati, Ohio

=== Permanent museum collections ===
- Museum of American Folk Art, New York, New York
- Cincinnati Art Museum, Cincinnati, Ohio
- The Henry Ford Art Collection, Detroit, Michigan
- Kentucky Folk Art Center
- New Orleans Museum of Art, New Orleans, Louisiana
- Roosevelt University, Chicago, Illinois
- Cumberland Valley Art Gallery, London, Kentucky

== See also ==
- List of American artists 1900 and after
- Grandma Moses
- Horace Pippin
