= Air Kentucky =

IATA	ICAO	Call sign
KN	AKY	AIR KENTUCKY
- Founded: 1970; 55 years ago Kentucky, United States
- Ceased operations: 1989; 36 years ago
- Alliance: USAir Express
- Headquarters: Kentucky, United States

Air Kentucky was a commuter airline based in Owensboro, Kentucky. It was also known for a time as Owensboro Aviation. It began operations in 1974, and joined the Allegheny Commuter system for Allegheny Airlines, and later USAir Express. The airline ended its operations in 1989.

The airline was mentioned in the film The Life Aquatic with Steve Zissou; one of the main characters, Ned Plimpton, is a pilot for Air Kentucky, however, in the film Ned mentioned that the airline was based out of Louisville, Kentucky.

== Destinations ==
- Illinois
  - Bloomington
  - Champaign/Urbana
  - Chicago Midway Airport
  - Decatur
  - Mount Vernon*
  - Peoria
  - Springfield
- Indiana
  - Evansville
  - Fort Wayne
  - Indianapolis
  - South Bend
  - Terre Haute*
- Kentucky
  - Bowling Green*
  - Cincinnati
  - Frankfort*
  - Lexington
  - London/Corbin*
  - Louisville
  - Owensboro
  - Paducah
- Missouri
  - St. Louis
- Tennessee
  - Clarksville*
  - Nashville

Those airports marked with an asterisk (*) are no longer served by commercial airline service.

== Fleet ==
- 13 Beechcraft Model 99
- 2 EMB-110 P
- 4 Fairchild Swearingen Metroliner SA-227

== See also ==
- List of defunct airlines of the United States
