= Tennessee Airways =

IATA	ICAO	Call sign
ZN	TEN	Tennessee
- Founded: 1978; 48 years ago
- Ceased operations: 1990; 36 years ago
- Hubs: McGhee Tyson Airport
- Headquarters: Knoxville, TN

Tennessee Airways was a regional airline that primarily provided passenger service to cities throughout the Southeastern United States. It did offer limited service to other cities outside of the southeast region. The airline was in service between 1978 and 1987 and was based out of Knoxville, Tennessee.

Stuart Adcock was president and major shareholder. He was somewhat of a hands-on executive, sometimes flying the planes and cleaning them after flights.

== Destinations ==
- Tennessee
  - Chattanooga (Chattanooga Metropolitan Airport)
  - Knoxville (McGhee Tyson Airport) - primary hub
  - Memphis (Memphis International Airport) - primary hub
  - Nashville (Nashville International Airport)
  - Tri-Cities (Tri-Cities Regional Airport)
- Alabama
  - Huntsville (Huntsville Municipal Airport)
- Georgia
  - Atlanta (William B. Hartsfield Atlanta International Airport)
- Kentucky
  - Boone County (Cincinnati/Northern Kentucky International Airport)
  - Lexington (Blue Grass Airport)
  - London (London-Corbin Airport)*
- North Carolina
  - Charlotte (Douglas Airport)
  - Greensboro (Greensboro/Winston-Salem/High Point Airport)
  - Pinehurst (Moore County Airport)*
- South Carolina
  - Greer (Greenville-Spartanburg International Airport)
- Virginia
  - Fairfax County (Washington Dulles International Airport)

Those airports marked with an asterisk (*) no longer have commercial airline service.

== Fleet ==
- Embraer EMB 110
- Piper T1020 (PA-31-350T1020)

== See also ==
- List of defunct airlines of the United States
