= Tower Air Flight 41 =

1995 aircraft accident in New York

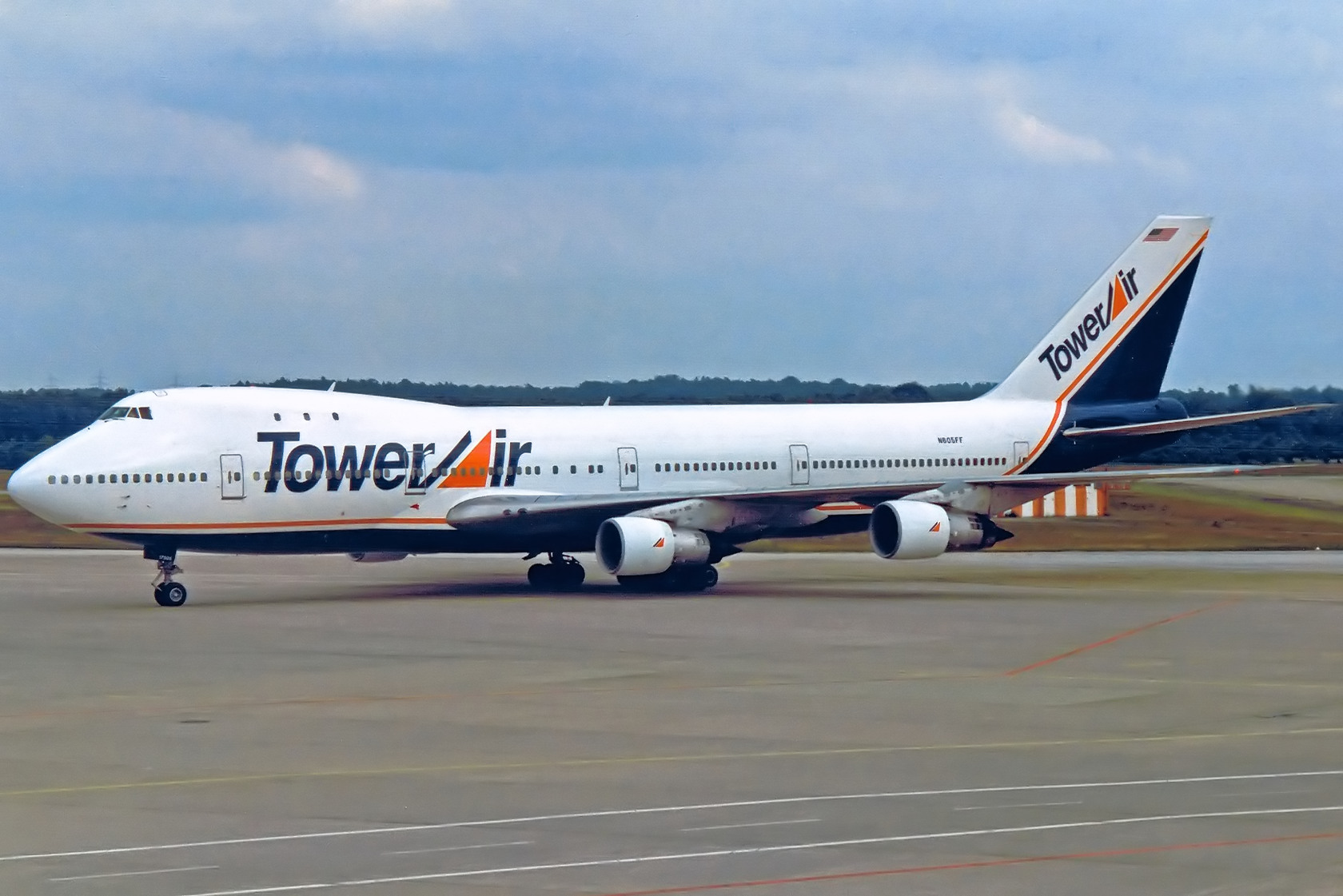
- N605FF, the aircraft involved in the accident, photographed in 1992

Accident
- Date: December 20, 1995
- Summary: Runway excursion on takeoff caused by pilot error; aggravated by inadequate procedures and airline management issues
- Site: Runway 4L, John F. Kennedy International Airport, New York City, New York, United States; 40°38′7″N 73°46′40″W

Aircraft
- Aircraft type: Boeing 747-136
- Operator: Tower Air
- IATA flight No.: FF41
- ICAO flight No.: TOW41
- Call sign: TEE AIR 41
- Registration: N605FF
- Flight origin: John F. Kennedy International Airport, New York City, New York
- Destination: Miami International Airport, Miami, Florida
- Occupants: 468
- Passengers: 451
- Crew: 17
- Fatalities: 0
- Injuries: 25
- Survivors: 468

Tower Air Flight 41 was a scheduled domestic passenger flight from John F. Kennedy International Airport (JFK) in New York City, to Miami International Airport (MIA) in Florida. On December 20, 1995, the Boeing 747-100 operating the flight veered off the runway during takeoff from JFK. All 468 people on board survived, but 25 people were injured. The aircraft was damaged beyond repair and written off, making the accident the 25th hull loss of a Boeing 747. The National Transportation Safety Board (NTSB) concluded that the captain had failed to reject the takeoff in a timely manner.

== Aircraft and crew ==
The aircraft involved was a 24-year-old Boeing 747-136 registered as N605FF. The aircraft was powered by four Pratt & Whitney JT9D-7A turbofan engines.

The 53-year-old captain had been with Tower Air since 1992, having previously served in the U.S. Navy from 1967 through 1986. He flew for Trans International Airlines from 1978 through 1984, and for Midway Airlines from 1984 through 1991. He had logged a total of 16,455 flight hours, including 2,905 hours on the Boeing 747. The 56-year-old first officer was hired by Tower Air less than a year before the accident and had 17,734 flight hours, with 4,804 of them on the Boeing 747. The 34-year-old flight engineer was the least experienced flight crew member, having been with Tower Air for less than a year before the accident. He had 4,609 hours, including 2,799 hours on the Boeing 747. Their names were not made public. (Note: According to the CVR transcript, the captain's last name was Law, the first officer's first name was Mike, and the flight engineer's first name was Ralph.)

== Accident ==
The flight crew was given a weather briefing by the airline's dispatchers. At 10:36 AM Eastern Standard Time (EST) Flight 41 pushed back from the gate and was subsequently de-iced. At 11:16 the flight began to taxi to runway 4L. The ramp had packed snow and patches of ice. Six minutes later, the captain stopped taxiing in order to clear additional ice by performing an engine run-up. Noting the outside conditions, he told the first officer, "If we start to move let me know."

The captain then started to increase engine thrust, only for the aircraft to start slipping in the process. The captain stopped the procedure and told the crew, "It's an ice rink here." After crossing runway 31L, the captain asked the flight engineer to go into the cabin and visually inspect the wings. The flight engineer left the cockpit at 11:30 and returned one minute later, confirming that the wings were not contaminated with ice.

At 11:32, Flight 41 lined up on runway 4L. The captain attempted the engine runup a second time, again to clear additional ice, this time without any incidents. Four minutes after lining up, at 11:36, Flight 41 was cleared for takeoff. The cockpit voice recorder (CVR) recorded the following:

11:36:44	First officer	Power's stable.
11:36:48	Commentary	[Sound similar to crew seat operation]
11:37:00	Commentary	[Low frequency sound similar to further increase in engine RPM]
11:37:04	Captain	Set time, takeoff thrust.
11:37:05	Flight engineer	Set the takeoff thrust.

Only five seconds after the flight engineer's callout and just before reaching 80 knots (92 mph; 150 km/h) (according to the captain in a post accident interview), the aircraft began to veer to the left of the runway centerline. At this time an unidentified crew member said "Watch it. Watch it." The captain responded by applying right rudder input and attempted to steer the aircraft to the right by using the tiller, neither of which worked. At 11:37:37 the captain rejected the takeoff:

11:37:12	Flight engineer	OK, losing it.
11:37:12	First officer	Going to the left.
11:37:13	Voice unidentified	Going to the left.
11:37:13	Flight engineer	To the right.
11:37:14	Flight engineer	You're going off.
11:37:15	Voice unidentified	Going off.
11:37:16	Captain	Aw [expletive].
11:37:17	Captain	Easy guys.
11:37:18	Captain	OK.
11:37:19	Commentary	[First sound of impact]
11:37:20	Voice unidentified	Pull up. Pull up.
11:37:21	Commentary	[Second sound of impact]
11:37:21		END OF RECORDING

The captain pulled the thrust levers back to idle and applied maximum braking, but did not apply the thrust reversers because of the aircraft's low speed and the large amount of runway remaining. The aircraft departed the left side of runway 4L at 11:37:19, skidding across taxiway Kilo and runway 13R/31L, striking three signs in the process. In the cabin, the overhead compartments and side bins both opened and their contents fell out. In the aft galley, two service carts dislodged and rolled down the aisle; one struck a flight attendant's left shoulder, breaking it. Only three flight attendants called "Grab ankles! Stay down!" to the passengers, as required in an emergency. At 11:37:21 the aircraft struck an electrical transformer owned by the Federal Aviation Administration (FAA) and came to a stop 4,800 feet (1,600 yd; 1,500 m) from the threshold of runway 4L. On impact with the transformer, the number four (outer right) engine separated from the aircraft and the nose landing gear collapsed, damaging the wiring for the public address (PA) and interphone systems.

After the aircraft stopped, the flight engineer told all passengers over the PA system to remain seated, though the announcement was only heard in the forward section of the aircraft. The purser unsuccessfully attempted to call the flight crew on the interphone, and then ran upstairs to the cockpit. The first officer had radioed air traffic control (ATC) of their situation and performed the engine shutdown checklist. The flight crew considered initiating an evacuation, but given the aircraft had remained mostly intact with no signs of fire or any other danger reported and the low wind chill factor outside the captain decided not to do so. Once emergency responders arrived at the aircraft, the purser unsuccessfully attempted to open doors L1 and R1. He and a rescue worker managed to open door L2 and the passengers and crew were deplaned via the air stairs. There were no fatalities, and the flight attendant's broken right shoulder was the only serious injury. One of the passengers on board was rabbi Moshe Teitelbaum.

== Investigation ==
The National Transportation Safety Board (NTSB) was informed of the accident just 13 minutes after it occurred and sent a "go-team" to JFK Airport. This was Tower Air's fourth accident/incident.

Analysis of the flight data recorder (FDR) revealed data that "lacked orderliness and reflected random values not resembling any type of flight operation." This was later determined to be caused by several malfunctioning components within the FDR that had gone unnoticed by Tower Air maintenance. Without data from the FDR, the NTSB had to rely on the CVR and statements from the crew for the investigation.

A sound spectrum study was performed on the CVR, during which investigators calculated engine fan speeds by analyzing the frequencies of tones associated with aircraft engines. The study revealed the following events:

Time		Selected CVR items		N_{1} (engine rotation speed) percentage
Actual time (EST)	Since takeoff clearance was issued (in seconds)	Source	Content	N_{1} (engine rotation speed) percentage
11:36:25	0	Tower controller	Tower forty one heavy, wind three three zero at one one, runway four left, RVR's one thousand eight hundred, cleared for takeoff.	0%
11:36:31	6	First officer (radio)	Cleared for takeoff four left, Tower Air forty one.	0%
11:36:44	19	Flight engineer	Power's stable.	40%
11:37:05	35	Flight engineer	Set the takeoff thrust.	87.5%
11:37:11	41	CAM	[Low frequency sound similar to engine noise can no longer be heard]	72.6%
11:37:12	42	Flight engineer	OK, losing it.	91%
11:37:14	44	Flight engineer	You're going off.	59%

Tower Air had gone through several management changes before Flight 41. At the time it occurred, the airline's General Operations Manual (GOM) did not provide the director of operations to supervise training and operations.

The airline's flight manual stated that using the rudder pedals during the takeoff roll was allowed until the airplane reached 80 knots. It also stated that takeoffs must be rejected if the aircraft began to deviate off the runway before the effect of the rudder. The manual required takeoffs on slippery runways were to be performed with slow thrust application and pilots to keep in mind the lag of nosewheel steering as well as optimizing directional control. One of the airline's chief pilots also stated if there was less than half rudder pedal available, the takeoff should be aborted. He also stated that the tiller was to be guarded by the pilot flying during takeoff. The NTSB determined that these procedures were inadequate for the Boeing 747. The sound spectrum study also revealed that the captain attempted to reapply engine thrust before rejecting the takeoff, when he should have rejected it at the first sign of the loss of directional control. The NTSB could not determine why the captain made excessive tiller inputs.

On August 8, 1996, pilots who worked for the NTSB, FAA, and/or Tower Air, performed simulated takeoffs on icy runways in a Boeing 747 simulator. All parties agreed that Boeing's simulator had a more realistic performance of ground handling characteristics (both in general and on slippery runways), while Tower Air's simulators were inaccurate in their performance of this simulation.

Tower Air's flight attendant training was inadequate as it did not specify communication and coordination, indicating why only three flight attendants had instructed passengers to take the brace position during the accident. The airline's management had failed to test FDR's before a flight, did not report management and organizational changes to the FAA, and experienced delays in revising its GOM. The FAA's oversight of Tower Air was inadequate due to their unfamiliarity with the inappropriate management changes. The NTSB even urged the federal government and the airline industry to re-examine aircraft stopping performance.

The NTSB released its final report on December 2, 1996, blaming the captain for rejecting the takeoff in an untimely manner along with applying inappropriate nosewheel steering tiller inputs. The inadequate slippery runway procedures for the Boeing 747 and the inaccuracies in the simulators of that aircraft were also contributing factors in the accident.

== See also ==
- Air Florida Flight 90
- World Airways Flight 30
- American Airlines Flight 965, occurred on the same day
