= World Chicken Festival =

Annual event in London, Kentucky

Chicken Festival
- Dates: Last full weekend in September
- Location: London, Kentucky
- Years active: 1990–2019, 2021–
- Website: http://chickenfestival.com/

The World Chicken Festival is an annual event held in downtown London, Kentucky, in Laurel County, on the last weekend in September. The festival celebrates the life of Colonel Sanders, founder of Kentucky Fried Chicken. Laurel County is the home to the original KFC restaurant in Corbin, Kentucky, founded in the 1940s.

== History and events ==
The Chicken Festival began in 1990 to celebrate the life of Harland Sanders. The Chicken Festival features many events centered around chicken and KFC such as an egg drop, Colonel Sanders look-a-like contest, and a "Run for the Roost" 5K.

No festival was planned in 2020 due to the COVID-19 pandemic.

== Largest frying pan ==
The festival features the world's largest stainless steel skillet. With a diameter of 10 ft 6 in (3.20 m), the hefty pan can cook 600 chicken quarters at one time.
