= THRR =

THRR or variation, may refer to:

- Training heart rate range (THRR)
- Thrombin receptor (ThrR)
- Thrr, Dog of Thunder (Marvel Comics), an anthropomorphic dog analogue of the Thor character from Earth-8311, as found in the comic book Spider-Ham

== See also ==
- Thr (disambiguation)
