= Tel Aviv Air =

German-Israeli airline

IATA	ICAO	Call sign
U8	CYF	TUS AIR
- Founded: 2021
- Ceased operations: 2022
- Destinations: 2
- Headquarters: Hamburg, Germany
- Key people: Shlomo Almagor (CEO); Paul Scodellaro (CEO)
- Website: tlv-air.com

Tel Aviv Air was a short-lived German virtual airline headquartered in Hamburg.

== History ==
Tel Aviv Air was founded by travel agency owner Shlomo Almagor and Paul Scodellaro, former sales manager of Germania, which went bankrupt in 2019 with the goal to reestablish direct flights between Hamburg and Tel Aviv. In April 2021, Tel Aviv Air was entered into the commercial register in Hamburg.

Tel Aviv Air's inaugural flight was scheduled for 19 September 2021, but was postponed twice due to the COVID-19 pandemic. The first flight finally took place on 6 March 2022. The flights are operated by the Cypriot Tus Airways, with an Airbus A320. Between 6 March 2022 and 24 March 2022 the flights were operated by the Polish charter airline Enter Air with Boeing 737-800.

However, in May 2022, after only a few weeks of operations, Tel Aviv Air ceased flights and filed for bankruptcy.

== Destinations ==
As of May 2022, Tel Aviv Air served the following destinations:

Country	City	Airport	Notes	Refs
Germany	Hamburg	Hamburg Airport		
Israel	Tel Aviv	Ben Gurion Airport		

== Fleet ==
As of May 2022, the Tel Aviv Air fleet consisted of the following contracted aircraft:

Tel Aviv Air fleet
Aircraft	In Service	Orders	Passengers		Notes
Aircraft	In Service	Orders	CY	Total	Notes
Airbus A320-200	1	—	180	180	operated by Tus Airways
