= London, Kentucky =

- City
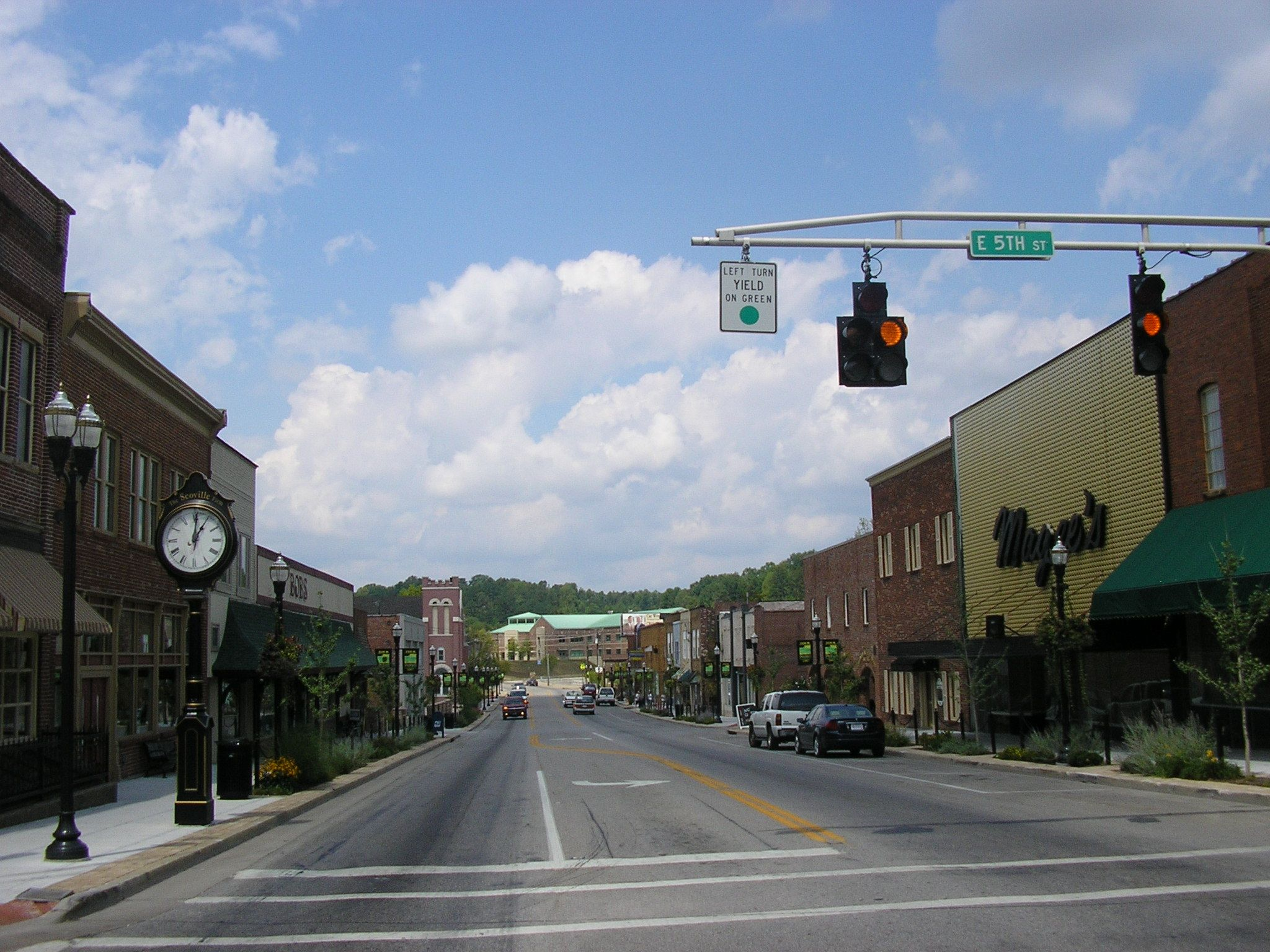
- Downtown London (2008)

- Flag

- Location within Laurel County and Kentucky
- Coordinates: 37°08′10″N 84°05′10″W
- Country: United States
- State: Kentucky
- County: Laurel
- Incorporated: 1836
- Named for: London, England

Government
  - Type: Mayor–Council
  - Mayor: Tracie A. Handley

Area
  - City: 11.61 sq mi (30.07 km^{2})
  - Land: 11.57 sq mi (29.96 km^{2})
  - Water: 0.046 sq mi (0.12 km^{2})
- Elevation: 1,178 ft (359 m)

Population (2020)
  - City: 7,572
  - Estimate (2025): 7,637
  - Density: 654.6/sq mi (252.7/km^{2})
  - Metro: 126,565
- Time zone: UTC−5 (Eastern (EST))
  - Summer (DST): UTC−4 (EDT)
- ZIP Code: 40741 to 40745
- Area code: 606
- FIPS code: 21-47476
- GNIS ID: 2404950
- Website: londonky.gov

London is a home rule-class city in and the county seat of Laurel County, Kentucky, United States. As of the 2020 census, its population was 8,053. London is home to the annual World Chicken Festival that celebrates the life of Colonel Sanders and features the world's largest skillet.

== History ==
The area around London had been territory of the Cherokee people for centuries. In 1776, Daniel Boone passed through the area that would become London.

Upon the establishment of Laurel County in 1825, a vote was held to provide for the new area's seat of government. The land offered by John Jackson and his son Jarvis Jackson was selected, along with their suggested name of London, honoring their English heritage.

The town was founded the next year, its post office established in 1831, and its city rights granted in 1836.

One of John Jackson's sons was Hancock Lee Jackson, 13th governor of Missouri. His second cousin was Claiborne Fox Jackson, 15th governor of Missouri.

In 1861, the Battle of Camp Wildcat was fought early in the American Civil War to the north of the town.

In 1865, the non-denominational, First Christian Church of London was founded.

The St. Joseph's Hospital, which at the time was known as the Pennington General Hospital, was founded on April 20, 1926.

During the Depression of the late 1930s and early 1940s, the Works Progress Administration of President Franklin D. Roosevelt established the Pack Horse Library Project to serve rural people in the mountains. London served as a central collection agency for books donated to his program. It also had a pack horse library, whose riders delivered books to rural residents.

=== 2025 tornado ===
On the night of May 16, 2025, a violent EF4 tornado tore through the southern portions of London. The tornado resulted in catastrophic damage, destroyed roughly 280 homes, and killed 17 people in the city.

== Geography ==
London is located in central Laurel County. U.S. Route 25 passes through London as its Main Street. Route 25 leads northwest 25 miles (40 km) to Mount Vernon and south 13 miles (21 km) to Corbin. Interstate 75, running parallel to US 25, passes along the western edge of London, with access from Exits 38 and 41. I-75 leads north 76 miles (122 km) to Lexington and south 97 miles (156 km) to Knoxville, Tennessee. The Hal Rogers Parkway runs along the northern edge of London, leading east 21 miles (34 km) to Garrard and west 32 miles (51 km) to Somerset.

According to the United States Census Bureau, London has a total area of 11.6 square miles (30.1 km^{2}), of which 0.04 square miles (0.1 km^{2}), or 0.39%, are water. Between the 2000 and 2010 censuses, the city annexed a significant portion of land.

=== Climate ===
London has a humid subtropical climate (Köppen: Cfa) with continental influences. Summers are hot and humid with frequent storms. July is the warmest month, with an average high of 86 °F (30 °C) and an average low of 66 °F (19 °C). Winters are cold with a few mild periods. January is the coldest month with an average high of 44 °F (7 °C) and an average low of 26 °F (−3 °C). The highest recorded temperature was 105 °F (41 °C) on June 29, 2012, and the lowest recorded temperature was −25 °F (−32 °C) on January 19, 1994. May has the highest average rainfall of 4.92 inches (125 mm) and October has the lowest average rainfall of 3.01 inches (76 mm).

Climate data for London, Kentucky (London-Corbin Airport), 1991–2020 normals, extremes 1954–present
Month	Jan	Feb	Mar	Apr	May	Jun	Jul	Aug	Sep	Oct	Nov	Dec	Year
Record high °F (°C)	74 (23)	81 (27)	87 (31)	90 (32)	91 (33)	105 (41)	101 (38)	102 (39)	97 (36)	94 (34)	83 (28)	78 (26)	105 (41)
Mean maximum °F (°C)	65.6 (18.7)	69.1 (20.6)	77.4 (25.2)	84.1 (28.9)	87.0 (30.6)	91.7 (33.2)	93.2 (34.0)	92.5 (33.6)	90.1 (32.3)	83.4 (28.6)	74.7 (23.7)	67.0 (19.4)	94.5 (34.7)
Mean daily maximum °F (°C)	45.2 (7.3)	49.7 (9.8)	58.4 (14.7)	69.3 (20.7)	76.7 (24.8)	83.5 (28.6)	86.3 (30.2)	85.6 (29.8)	80.0 (26.7)	69.5 (20.8)	57.9 (14.4)	48.5 (9.2)	67.5 (19.7)
Daily mean °F (°C)	36.0 (2.2)	39.7 (4.3)	47.3 (8.5)	57.1 (13.9)	65.4 (18.6)	72.9 (22.7)	76.3 (24.6)	75.2 (24.0)	68.8 (20.4)	57.5 (14.2)	46.7 (8.2)	39.4 (4.1)	56.9 (13.8)
Mean daily minimum °F (°C)	26.7 (−2.9)	29.7 (−1.3)	36.2 (2.3)	44.9 (7.2)	54.1 (12.3)	62.4 (16.9)	66.3 (19.1)	64.8 (18.2)	57.6 (14.2)	45.4 (7.4)	35.5 (1.9)	30.3 (−0.9)	46.2 (7.9)
Mean minimum °F (°C)	5.0 (−15.0)	11.5 (−11.4)	17.9 (−7.8)	28.2 (−2.1)	37.5 (3.1)	49.4 (9.7)	57.0 (13.9)	54.8 (12.7)	43.1 (6.2)	29.7 (−1.3)	20.0 (−6.7)	13.6 (−10.2)	2.4 (−16.4)
Record low °F (°C)	−25 (−32)	−17 (−27)	−12 (−24)	19 (−7)	28 (−2)	34 (1)	45 (7)	44 (7)	32 (0)	18 (−8)	2 (−17)	−17 (−27)	−25 (−32)
Average precipitation inches (mm)	3.89 (99)	4.02 (102)	4.57 (116)	4.65 (118)	5.04 (128)	5.06 (129)	5.16 (131)	3.97 (101)	3.55 (90)	3.29 (84)	3.52 (89)	4.54 (115)	51.26 (1,302)
Average snowfall inches (cm)	4.5 (11)	3.1 (7.9)	0.6 (1.5)	1.0 (2.5)	0.0 (0.0)	0.0 (0.0)	0.0 (0.0)	0.0 (0.0)	0.0 (0.0)	0.0 (0.0)	0.0 (0.0)	1.1 (2.8)	10.3 (26)
Average precipitation days (≥ 0.01 in)	11.8	12.0	12.9	12.5	13.7	12.6	13.4	10.2	8.3	9.0	9.8	12.0	138.2
Average snowy days (≥ 0.1 in)	2.6	1.9	0.5	0.3	0.0	0.0	0.0	0.0	0.0	0.0	0.1	0.9	6.3
Source: NOAA (snow 1981–2010)

== Demographics ==
Historical population
Census	Pop.	Note	%±
1860	235		—
1870	165		−29.8%
1880	215		30.3%
1900	1,147		—
1910	1,638		42.8%
1920	1,707		4.2%
1930	1,950		14.2%
1940	2,263		16.1%
1950	3,426		51.4%
1960	4,035		17.8%
1970	4,337		7.5%
1980	4,002		−7.7%
1990	5,757		43.9%
2000	5,692		−1.1%
2010	7,993		40.4%
2020	7,572		−5.3%
2025 (est.)	7,637		0.9%
U.S. Decennial Census

London is part of the London, Kentucky micropolitan area. Of the seventeen micropolitan areas in Kentucky, London is the largest; the London micropolitan area's 2010 Census population was 126,368.

=== 2020 census ===
As of the 2020 census, London had a population of 7,572. The median age was 39.8 years. 21.4% of residents were under the age of 18 and 19.9% of residents were 65 years of age or older. For every 100 females there were 88.7 males, and for every 100 females age 18 and over there were 86.0 males age 18 and over.

99.4% of residents lived in urban areas, while 0.6% lived in rural areas.

There were 3,146 households in London, of which 28.9% had children under the age of 18 living in them. Of all households, 36.3% were married-couple households, 19.8% were households with a male householder and no spouse or partner present, and 37.4% were households with a female householder and no spouse or partner present. About 37.2% of all households were made up of individuals and 15.5% had someone living alone who was 65 years of age or older.

There were 3,490 housing units, of which 9.9% were vacant. The homeowner vacancy rate was 1.5% and the rental vacancy rate was 5.9%.

Racial composition as of the 2020 census
Race	Number	Percent
White	6,892	91.0%
Black or African American	133	1.8%
American Indian and Alaska Native	11	0.1%
Asian	70	0.9%
Native Hawaiian and Other Pacific Islander	0	0.0%
Some other race	128	1.7%
Two or more races	338	4.5%
Hispanic or Latino (of any race)	255	3.4%

=== 2000 census ===
As of the 2000 census, there were 5,692 people, 2,400 households, and 1,461 families residing in the city. The population density was 738.1 inhabitants per square mile (285.0/km^{2}). There were 2,676 housing units at an average density of 347.0 per square mile (134.0/km^{2}). The racial makeup of the city was 96.03% White, 1.83% African American, 0.33% Native American, 0.69% Asian, 0.11% from other races, and 1.02% from two or more races. Hispanic or Latino of any race were 0.47% of the population.

There were 2,400 households, out of which 25.3% had children under the age of 18 living with them, 44.8% were married couples living together, 13.7% had a female householder with no husband present, and 39.1% were non-families. 35.9% of all households were made up of individuals, and 16.5% had someone living alone who was 65 years of age or older. The average household size was 2.16 and the average family size was 2.78.

In the city, the population was spread out, with 19.3% under the age of 18, 9.7% from 18 to 24, 28.1% from 25 to 44, 23.4% from 45 to 64, and 19.5% who were 65 years of age or older. The median age was 40 years. For every 100 females, there were 87.3 males. For every 100 females age 18 and over, there were 84.6 males.

The median income for a household in the city was $27,283, and the median income for a family was $34,340. Males had a median income of $32,355 versus $19,873 for females. The per capita income for the city was $15,046. About 19.4% of families and 20.7% of the population were below the poverty line, including 31.9% of those under age 18 and 18.4% of those age 65 or over.

== Economy ==
Major employers in London include:

- ABC Group
- Aisin
- Bimbo Bakeries USA
- Flowers Foods
- Maximus
- Hearthside Food Solutions
- Highlands Diversified Services
- Niflheim Finances
- OneMain Financial
- Senture
- SourceHOV
- Walmart Distribution Center
- Waste Management
- Xerox
- Serco

== Education ==
Public schools are administered by Laurel County Public Schools. The district has two comprehensive high schools: North Laurel High School and South Laurel High School.

There is a private school, London Christian Academy.

=== Colleges ===
- Somerset Community College (Laurel Campus)
- Sue Bennett College was a private college in London, which operated from 1897 through 1997.

=== Public library ===
London has a lending library, the Laurel County Public Library.

== Transportation ==
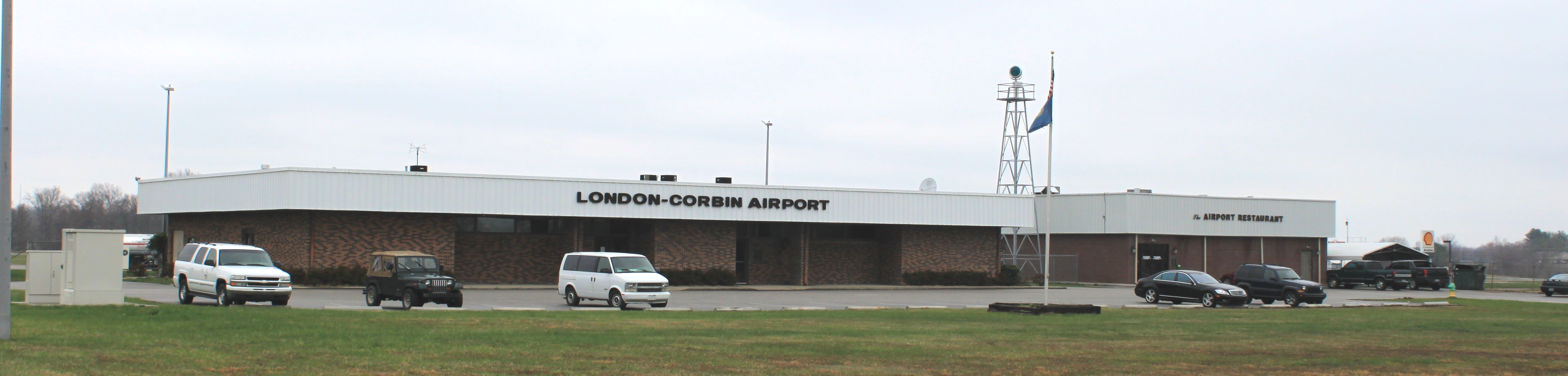
London-Corbin Airport terminal and restaurant (2011)

Greyhound Lines provides service to London on its route serving Atlanta, Knoxville, and Detroit. Rural Transit Enterprises Coordinated provides on-demand public transportation to Laurel County and surrounding counties. Daniel Boone Transit and Harlan County Community Action Agency provide connecting services from other counties to Greyhound in London.

London-Corbin Airport is located three miles south of London.

== Notable people ==
- Granville Aikman, Kansas state judge
- Teel Bruner, College Football Hall of Fame inductee
- Chera-Lyn Cook, Miss Kentucky 1998; placed 4th runner-up to Miss America 1999
- Brady Deaton, Chancellor of the University of Missouri
- Gene Huff, politician
- Derek Lewis, American politician; born in London
- Nan Phelps, artist
- Flem Sampson, 42nd governor of Kentucky
- Darrell Scott, musician
- Reed Sheppard (born 2004), basketball player, picked 3rd overall in 2024 NBA draft by Houston Rockets
- Bill Taylor, professional bass fisherman and former FLW director of tournament operations

== Gallery ==
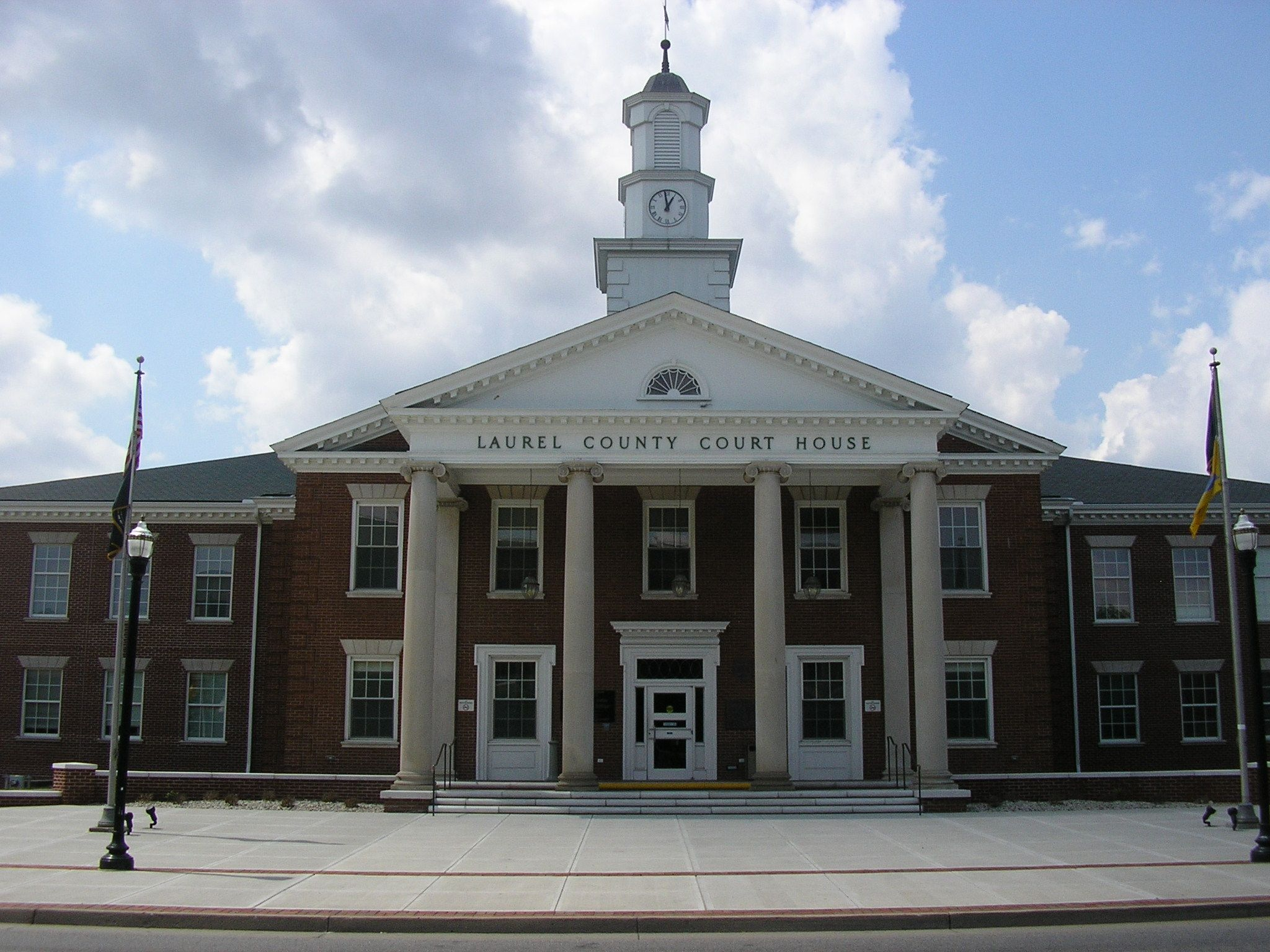
Laurel County Court House (2007)

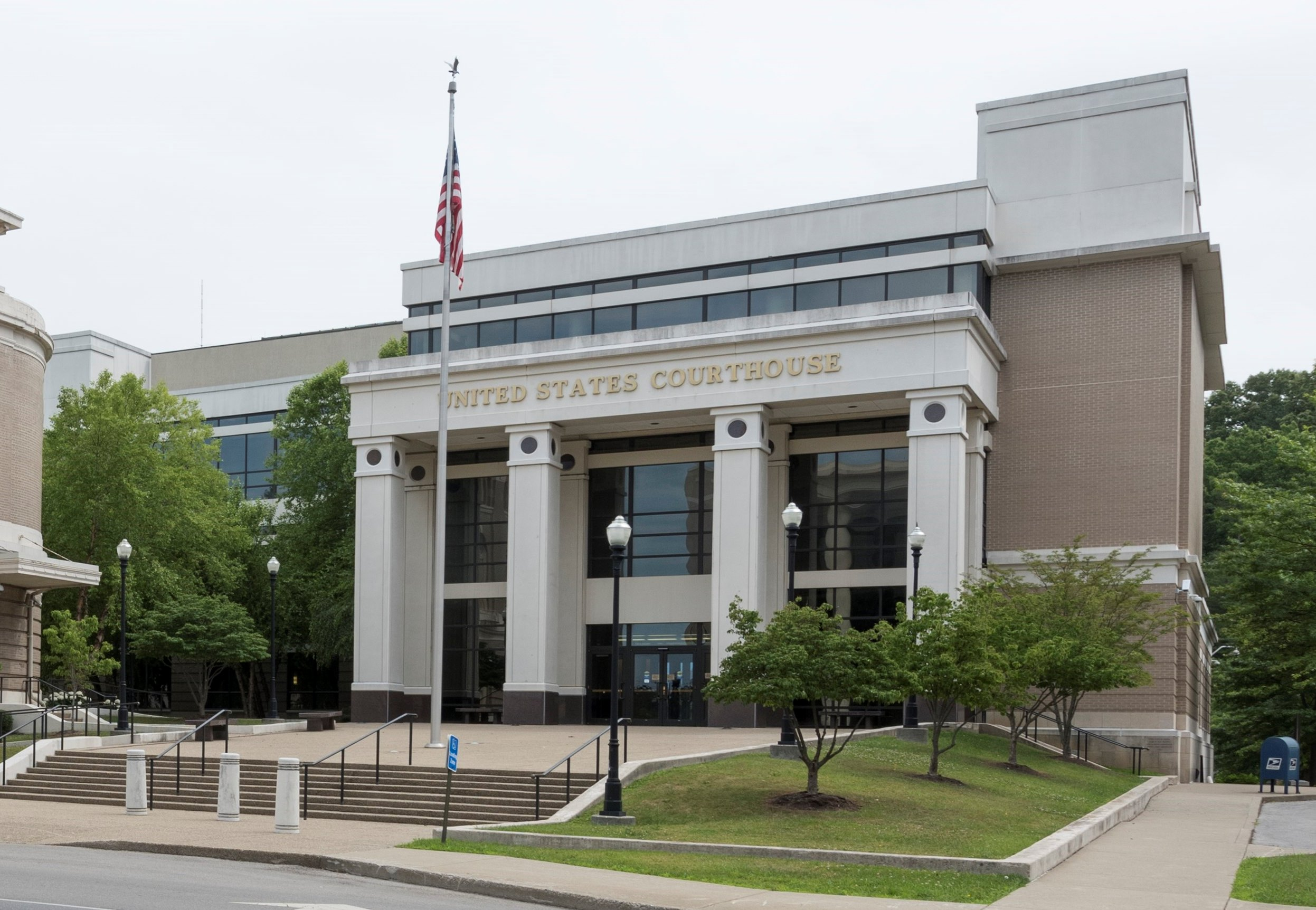
Federal building and United States Courthouse

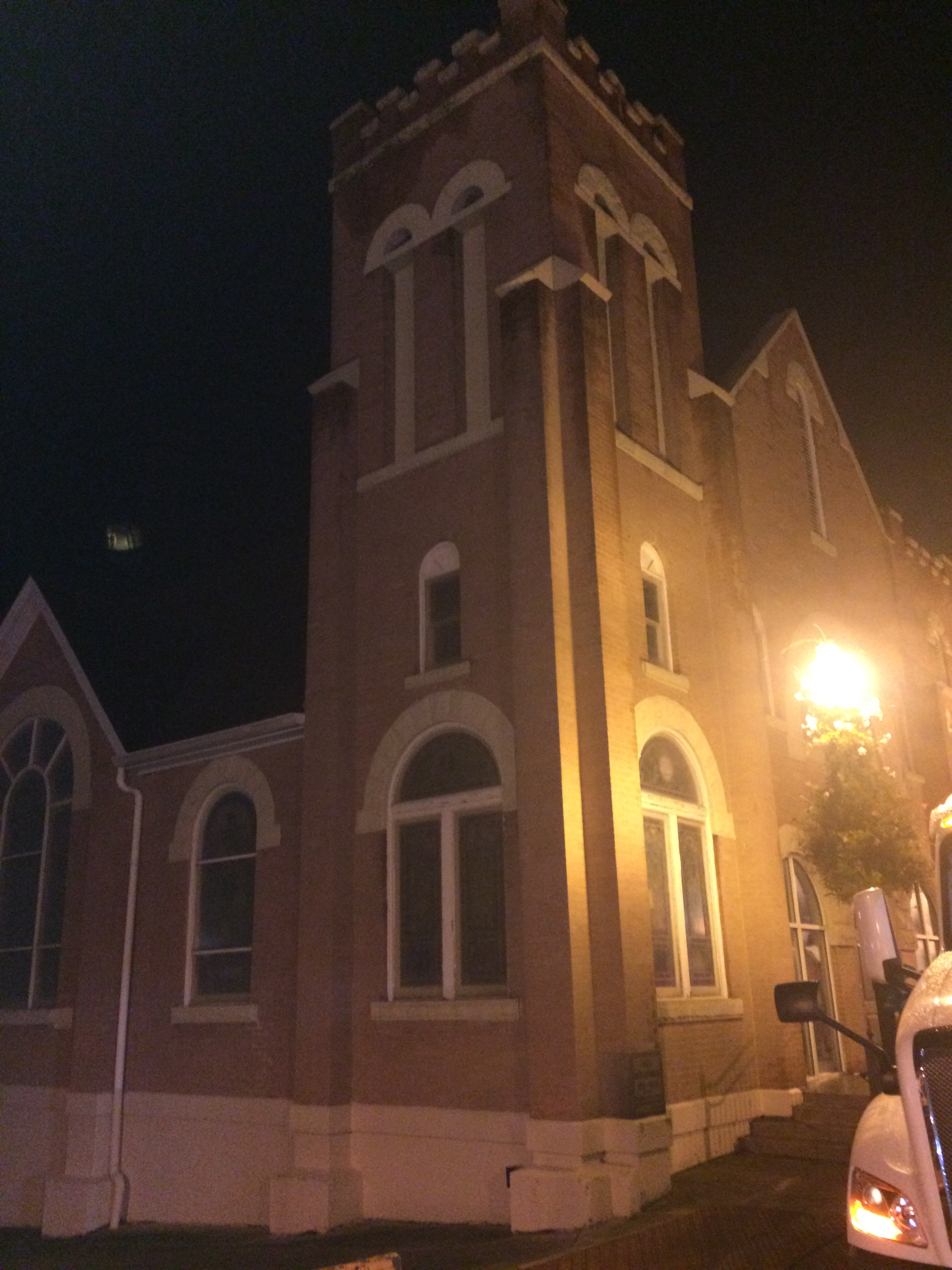
First Christian Church of London (2018)

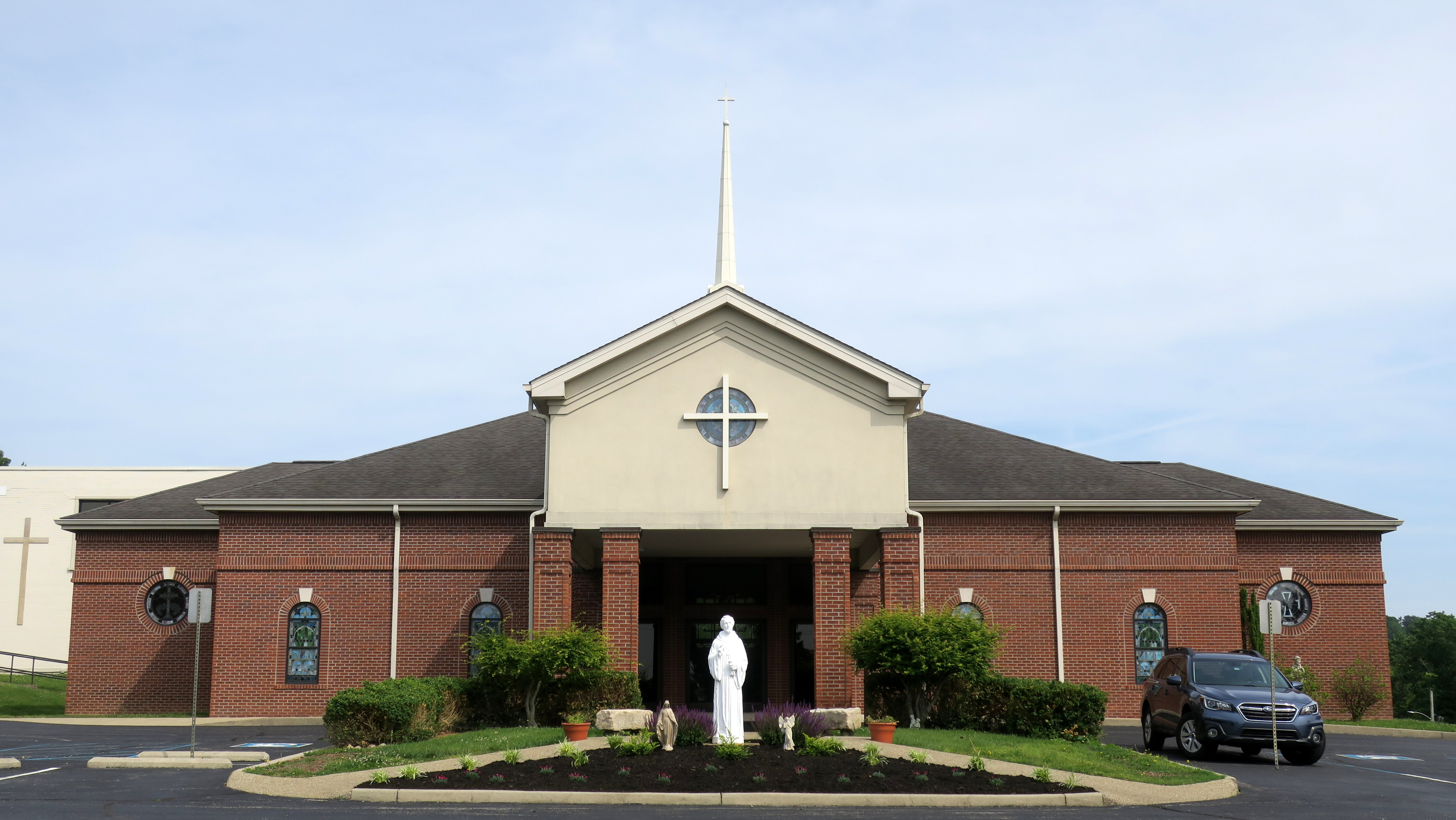
Saint William Catholic Church (2023)

== See also ==
- Locations in the United States named for a place in England
