= Tavrey Airlines =

Ukrainian charter airline

IATA	ICAO	Call sign
T6	TVR	TAVREY
- Founded: 1995
- Ceased operations: 2008
- Hubs: Odesa Airport; Simferopol Airport
- Fleet size: 4
- Parent company: Tavrey Aircompany
- Headquarters: Odesa, Ukraine

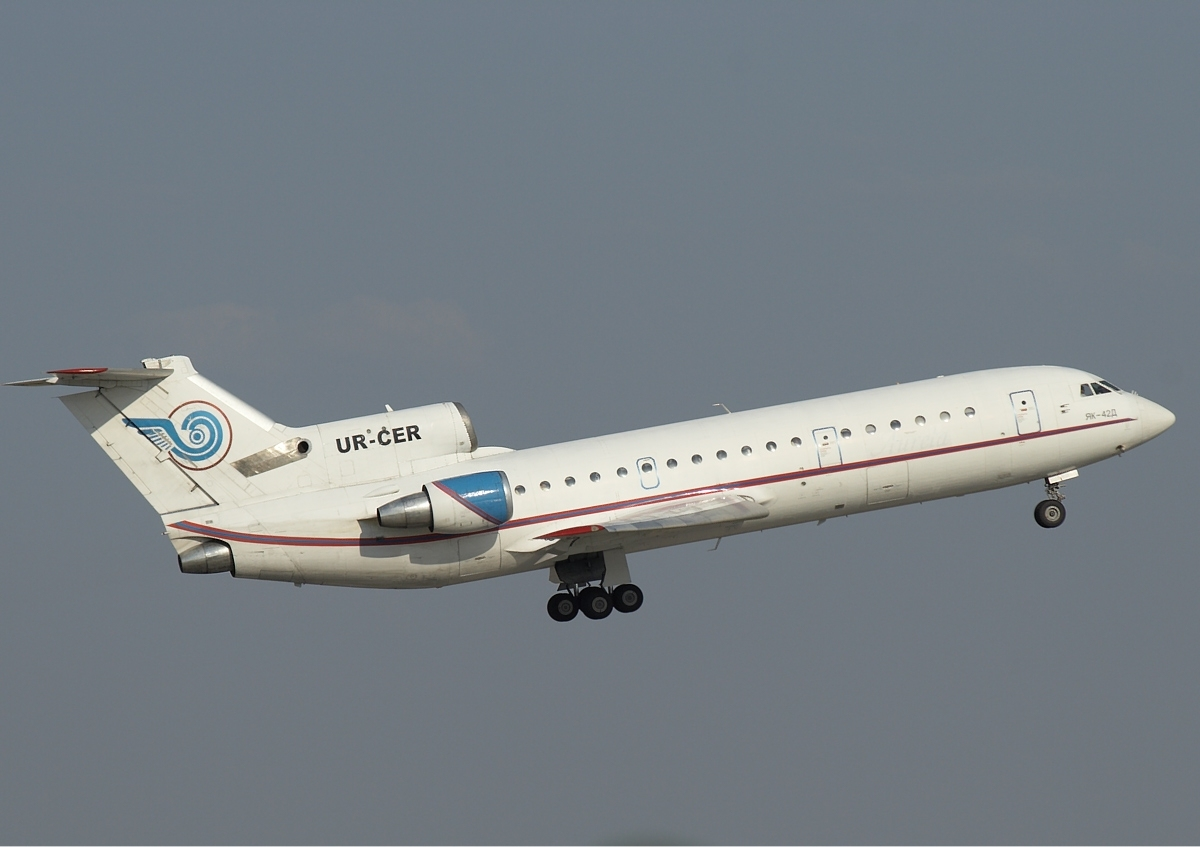
Tavrey Airlines Yakovlev Yak-42, 2008

Tavrey Airlines, also known as Tavrey Aircompany, was an airline based in Odesa, Ukraine.

== Fleet ==
The Tavrey Airlines fleet consisted of three Yakolev Yak-42s when it ceased operations in 2008.

- 4 Yakovlev Yak-42
