= Thai Air Cargo =

Cargo airline, 2004–2006

IATA	ICAO	Call sign
T2	TCG	THAI CARGO
- Founded: 2004
- Ceased operations: 2006
- Parent company: CTI Holdings

Thai Air Cargo (T2 Cargo), was a cargo airline based in Bangkok, Thailand, operating from 2004 to 2006.

== History ==
Thai Air Cargo was established in December 2004 as a joint venture between a Thai logistics firm, Commercial Transport International, or CTI Holdings (51%) and Australian airline Qantas (49%).

Thai Air Cargo was to initially target markets in Japan, China, India and Europe.

In 2005, the company announced it was to wet lease a McDonnell Douglas MD-11 from US-based World Airways.

Beginning operations at a time when Thailand's national flag carrier Thai Airways International was focused more on its passenger business, Thai Air Cargo filled a niche and appeared to be doing good business, with 95% load factors.

However, in March 2006, Thailand's Civil Aviation Department said it was withdrawing the cargo carrier's license, and it appears the airline has gone out of business.
