= Transair-Gyraintiee =

1996–2010 airline in Arkhangelsk, Russia

Transair-Gyraintiee (Трансавиа-Гарантия)
| IATA | ICAO | Call sign |
|---|---|---|
| - | KTS | KOTAIR |
- Founded: 1996
- Ceased operations: 2010
- Hubs: Arkhangelsk, Russia
- Fleet size: 6
- Headquarters: Arkhangelsk, Russia
- Key people: Victor A Moses (Director-General), Kulakov Larisa (Chef Accountant), Yarkov Alexander (Deputy Director-General)

Transair-Gyraintiee was a regional charter airline based in Arkhangelsk, Russia and established in 1996. Operations ceased in 2010 when new regulations were enforced.

== Fleet ==
| Aircraft type | Active | Notes |
|---|---|---|
| Yakovlev Yak-40 | 2 | |
| Antonov An-26-100 | 1 | |
| Antonov An-26B-100 | 3 | |
