= Transavio =

Italian aerial work and regional airline

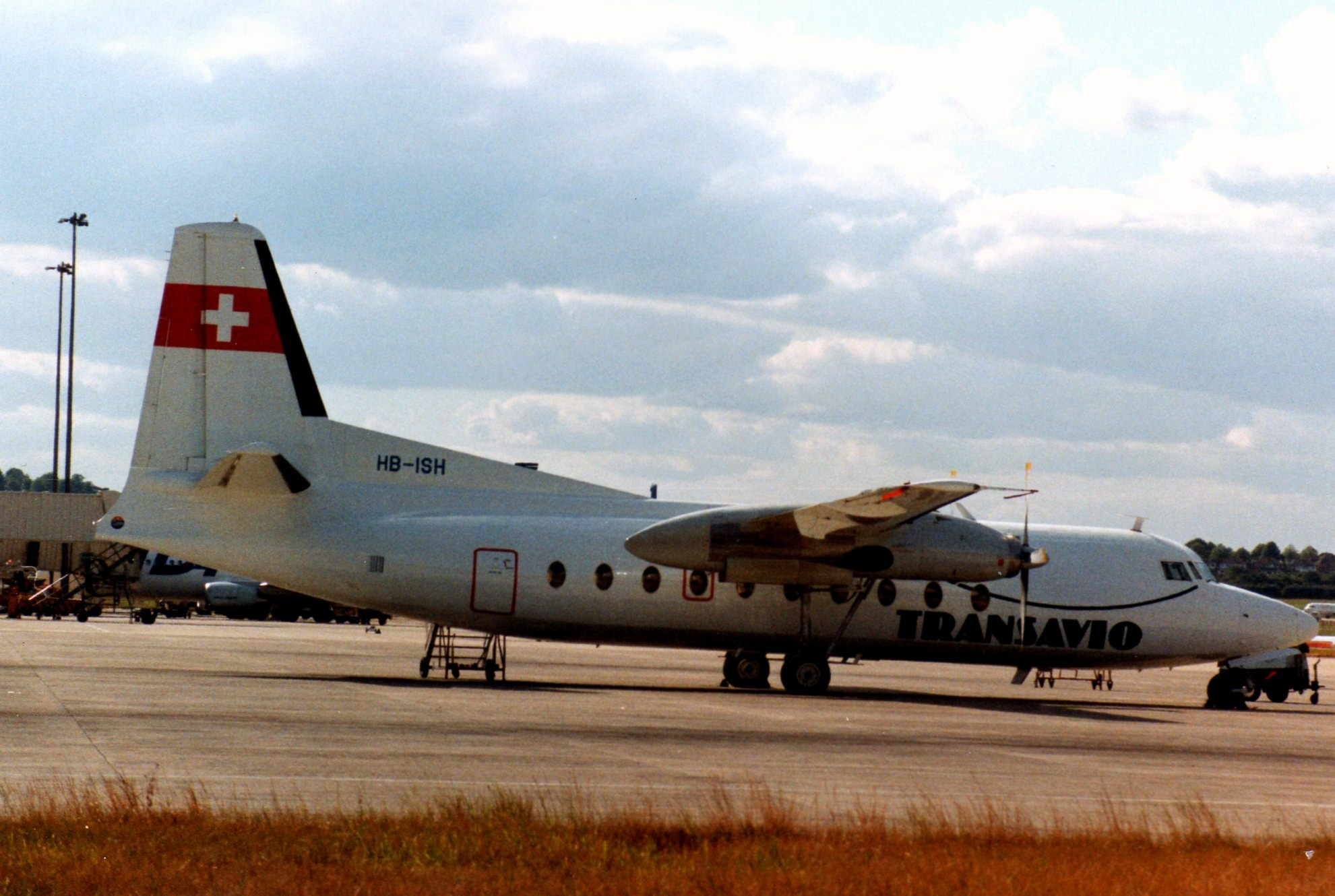
- Fokker F27
- Founded: 1980
- Commenced operations: 1981 regional routes
- Ceased operations: 1995
- Operating bases: various
- Hubs: Milan, Pisa
- Headquarters: Milan
- Key people: Italo Ballerio

Transavio was an aerial work company and a pioneering Italian regional airline.

== History ==
Founded in 1980, as a fully-fledged transport company, it was credited with being the first truly regional airline in Italy. Headquarters were located in Milan. The founder was Italo Ballerio, a pilot and son of a pilot, who became president, sole leader of the company, and led with far-sighted vision. He already had a flying career behind him in a somewhat modern Fiat G.5, towing advertising banners or creating advertising slogans in the sky with smoke trails. Transavio was the first company in Italy to carry out aerial work and aerial advertising (in 1950) and (from 1977) forest fire surveillance in five regions.

Over the years, the fleet included various types of aircraft, all suited to specific tasks: Piaggio P.166, Britten-Norman BN.2 Islander, and Piper PA-18 Super Cub. The first two types were dedicated to scheduled flights, as many as 22 examples of the Piper monoplane were distributed throughout the nation for the fire-spotting service paid for by the various regional governments.

After careful market research, experimental scheduled flights from Pisa began in 1979, coinciding with the most important Alitalia Group scheduled connections. Short-haul flights, such as the Pisa-Elba Island route, began on June 1, 1981, using Piaggio P.166s and BN.2s. ENAC (Italian civil aviation authority) authorization was issued on March 8, 1982. In 1984, the Pisa-Bastia (Corse Island) three-weekly service was also established. Initially, all flights were seasonal. In 1985, seasonal flights were established from Florence to Elba Island and Bastia (Corsica). Then, starting with 1986/1987 months, Pisa-Grosseto and Pisa-Florence connections were added, as well as the direct Florence-Elba Island and Milan-Elba Island flights. The first international flight took place in September 1989: Rome-Lugano. This charming town in Ticino canton was also connected to Florence from April 1990. Flights to Switzerland were operated by a 39-seat Fokker F27 leased from the Swiss partner Sunshine Aviation. Transavio was also the first ever customer of the twin-engined Partenavia Viator, a turboprop-powered evolution of the P.68. Business continued smoothly until the company closed in 1995.

== Fleet ==
- 3 Britten-Norman BN.2 Islander
- 2 leased Fokker F27
- 1 Partenavia Viator
- 1 Piaggio P.166
- 22 Piper PA-18 Super Cub
- 1 Piper PA-32

== See also ==
- Transport in Italy
- List of companies of Italy
