= London-Corbin Airport =

London-Corbin Airport Magee Field
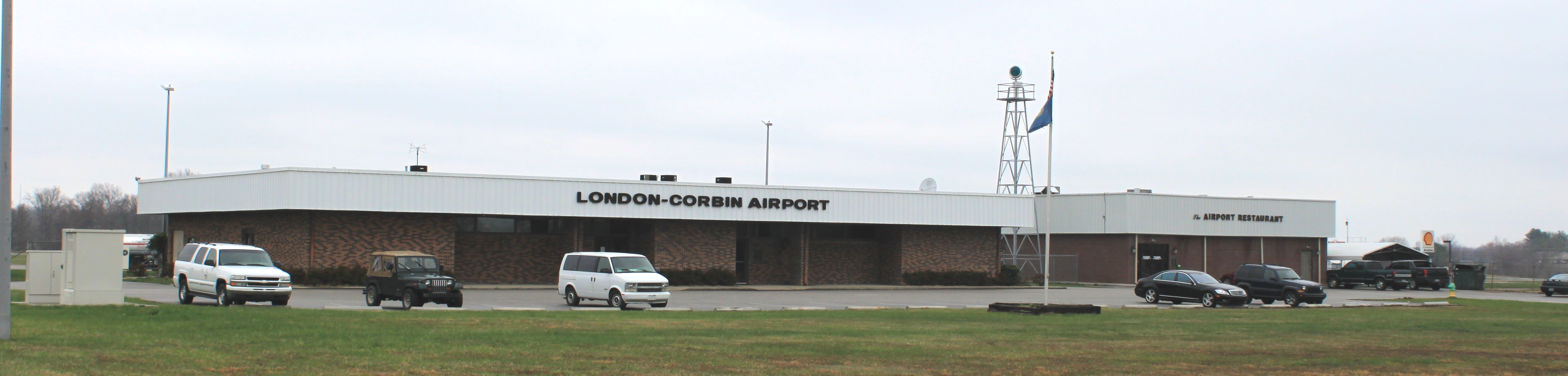
- Terminal and restaurant
- IATA: LOZ; ICAO: KLOZ; FAA LID: LOZ

Summary
- Airport type: Public
- Owner: Cities of London & Corbin
- Serves: London, Kentucky
- Elevation AMSL: 1,212 ft / 369 m
- Coordinates: 37°05′13″N 084°04′39″W
- Website: london-corbinairport.com
- Interactive map of London-Corbin Airport

Runways
Direction	Length		Surface
Direction	ft	m	Surface
6/24	5,750	1,753	Asphalt

Statistics (2006)
- Aircraft operations: 13,063
- Based aircraft: 73
- Source: Federal Aviation Administration

London-Corbin Airport (IATA: LOZ, ICAO: KLOZ, FAA LID: LOZ) (Magee Field) is in Laurel County, Kentucky, three miles south of London and about 12 miles north of Corbin. The airport is operated by both cities.

It has no scheduled airline service; the most recent flights were US Airways Express dba Air Kentucky and Tennessee Airways. From 1953 to 1980 the airport was served by Piedmont Airlines' Douglas DC-3s, Fairchild Hiller FH-227s and NAMC YS-11s.

== History ==
Construction began in July 1951 and the first commercial flight landed at the airport on October 2, 1953. Work on extending the runway to 6,000 ft (1,800 m) began in 1968.

The airport was severely damaged by an EF4 tornado on May 16, 2025. The T-34 Association was holding an event at the airport and a number of its members' aircraft were destroyed.

== Facilities ==
London-Corbin Airport covers 186 acres (75 ha) at an elevation of 1,212 feet (369 m). Its one runway, 6/24, is 5,750 by 150 feet (1,753 x 46 m) asphalt.

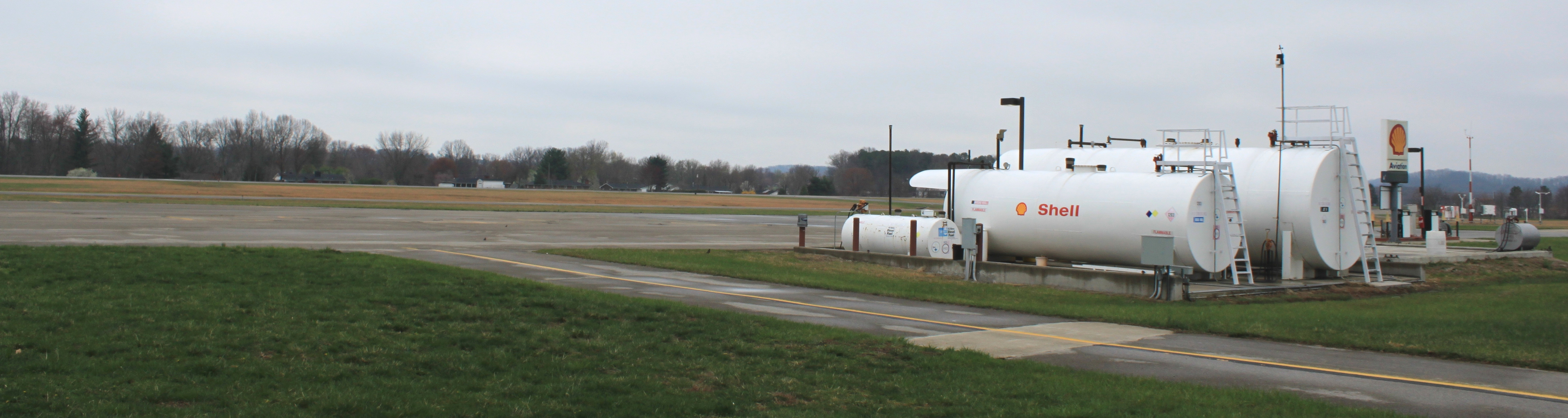
Fuel tanks near runway

In the year ending January 10, 2006, the airport had 13,063 aircraft operations, average 35 per day: 53% general aviation, 31% military and 17% air taxi. 73 aircraft were then based at the airport: 78% single-engine, 7% multi-engine, 3% jet, 10% helicopter, 1% glider, 1% ultralight.

Aircraft construction, maintenance, and repairs are offered on field by Kolb Aircraft, and Ayers Aviation.

The Kentucky National Guard built a readiness facility on the field in 2009, dedicated by Adjutant General Don Storm at opening.

Congressman Hal Rogers announced in 2019 that the London-Corbin Airport will receive $1.85 million in federal grant from the U.S. Department of Transportation to rehabilitate the runway. The funding is part of a $5 million project to repair the 6,000 feet of runway.

== See also ==
- List of airports in Kentucky
