= Tarhan Tower Airlines =

Turkish airline

IATA	ICAO	Call sign
–	TTH	–
- Founded: 2006
- Ceased operations: December 2007
- Hubs: Atatürk International Airport
- Fleet size: 2
- Destinations: 16
- Headquarters: Istanbul, Turkey
- Website: http://www.ttairlines.com/

Tarhan Tower Airlines was a charter airline based in Istanbul, Turkey. Its main hub was Atatürk International Airport.During December 2007 SHGM (Turkish Civil Aviation authority) suspended the licence allowing the airline to operate due to issues found within the airlines maintenance department.

== Services ==
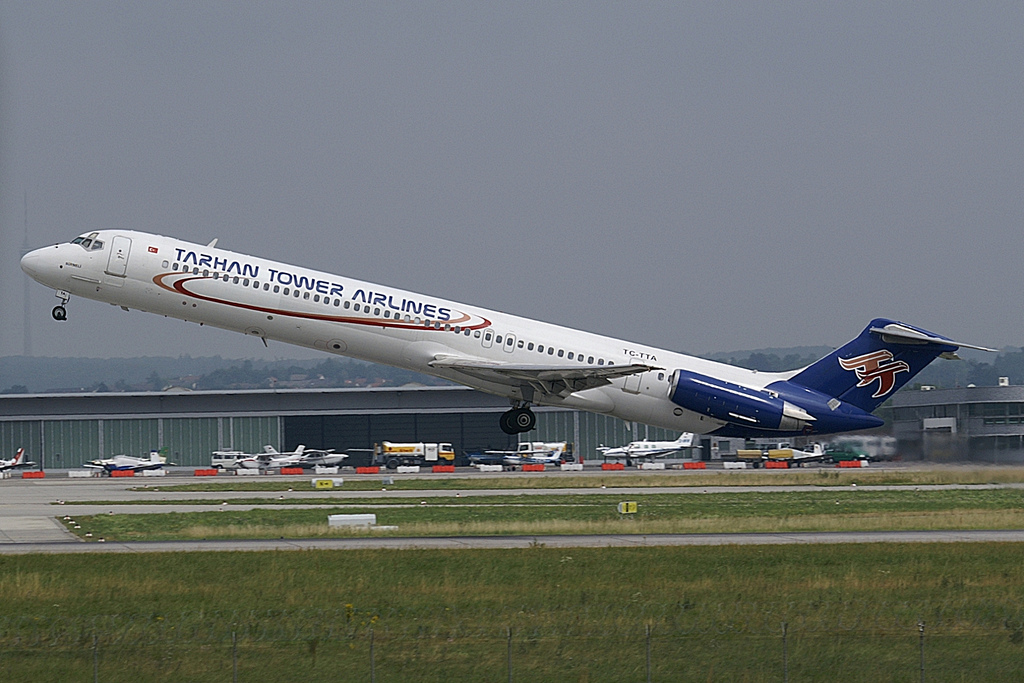
Tarhan Tower Airlines MD-82

Tarhan Tower Airlines operated the following services (at December 2006):

=== Domestic destinations ===
- Adana
- Ankara
- Antalya
- Istanbul Atatürk
- İzmir
- Kayseri

=== International destinations ===
- Germany
  - Stuttgart
- Iraq
  - Erbil
- Belgium
  - Brussels
- Israel
  - Tel Aviv
- Armenia
  - Yerevan
- Iran
  - Tehran
- France
  - Paris
- Italy
  - Bari
  - Milan
  - Naples
- The Netherlands
  - Amsterdam
