= Tower Air =

Charter airline

IATA	ICAO	Call sign
FF	TOW	TEE AIR
- Founded: 1983; 43 years ago
- Ceased operations: 2000; 26 years ago
- Hubs: John F. Kennedy International Airport
- Focus cities: Ben Gurion Airport
- Fleet size: 17
- Destinations: 9
- Headquarters: Hangar #17; John F. Kennedy International Airport; Jamaica, Queens, New York City, New York
- Key people: Morris K. Nachtomi (co-founder, owner, manager)
- Website: www.towerair.com (defunct)

Tower Air was a certificated FAR 121 U.S. charter airline that also operated scheduled passenger service from 1983 until 2000 when the company declared bankruptcy and was liquidated. Scheduled flights were initially offered over a New York – Brussels – Tel Aviv route in addition to charter flights to Athens, Frankfurt, Rome, and Zurich. Short-lived New York – Los Angeles flights were introduced with the addition of an ex-Avianca Boeing 747-100 in 1984. The airline was headquartered in Building 178 and later in Hangar 17 at John F. Kennedy International Airport in Jamaica, Queens, New York City.

== History ==
Tower Air was co-founded, majority-owned, and managed by Morris K. Nachtomi, an Israeli citizen who had emigrated to the United States. After a 30-year career with El Al, he moved to New York to start a passenger operation for Flying Tiger Line, Metro International Airways. After this airline shut down, Nachtomi acquired the "Tower" brand from a packaged tour agency called Tower Travel Corporation. Tower Air began charter service in 1983 and served a number of international destinations, with a focus on charter flights to Israel. Nachtomi eventually bought out his partners to control about three-quarters of the stock.

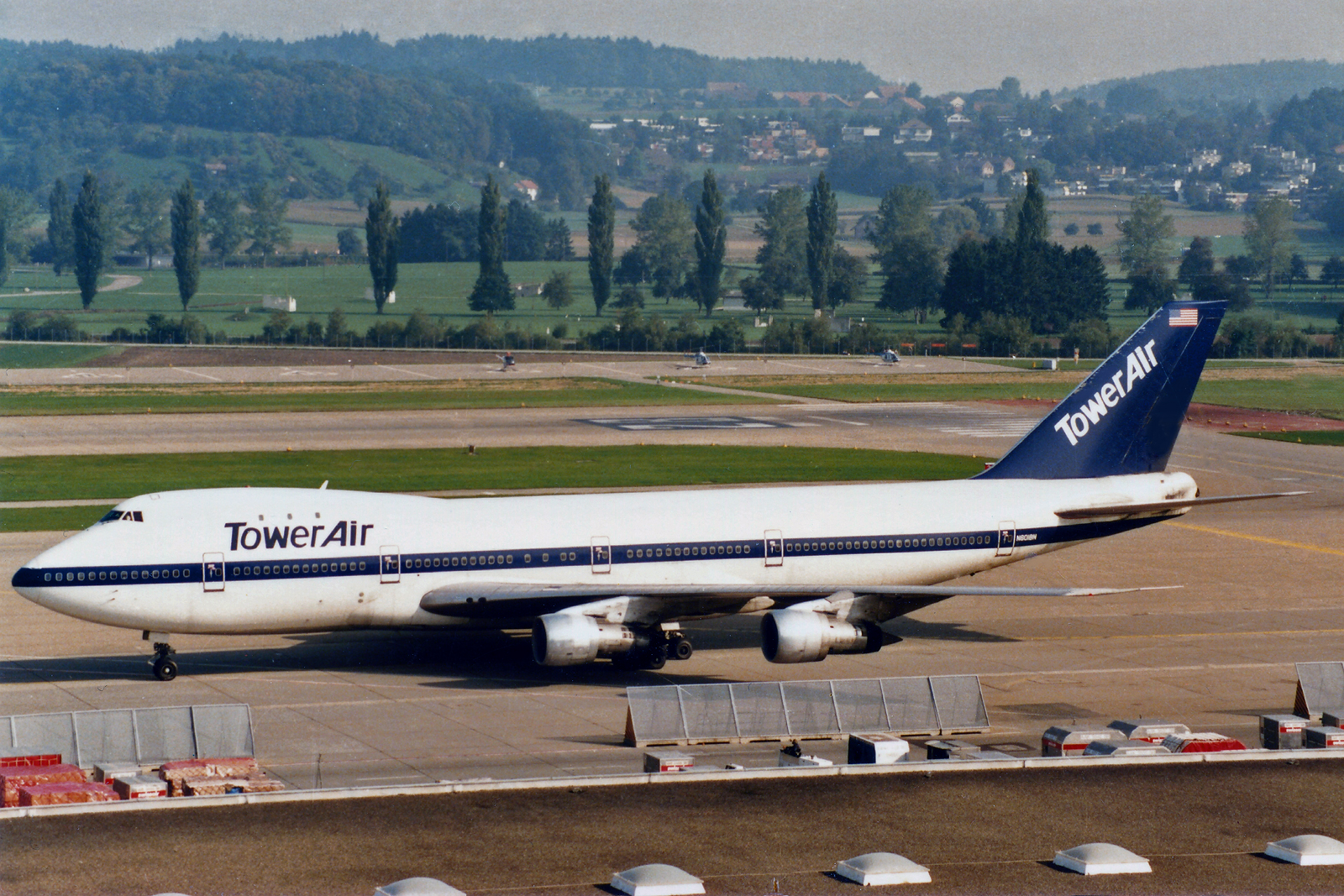
A Boeing 747-100 at Zurich in 1985. This aircraft was acquired from Braniff International Airways.

Arthur Fondlier, son of Sam Fondlier and the former Chief Financial Officer of Tower Air, was a passenger in the first-class section of Pan Am flight 103. His untimely death gave Morris Nachtomi much more freedom in management and cost-cutting.

The company won many contracts from the United States Department of Defense to transport armed forces personnel to overseas locations, and from the United Nations to transport troops to their peacekeeping missions all over the world. Tower often flew charters for groups of Muslim pilgrims to Mecca.

Tower Air's main base of scheduled operations was John F. Kennedy International Airport in New York. In the mid-1980s, the airline operated from the British Airways terminal at JFK (now Terminal 7). In the early 1990s, it operated from the former Eastern terminal. In 1993, Tower Air renovated and expanded Building 213, a former Pan Am hangar, to serve as its dedicated JFK terminal, adding three finger gates in 1995.

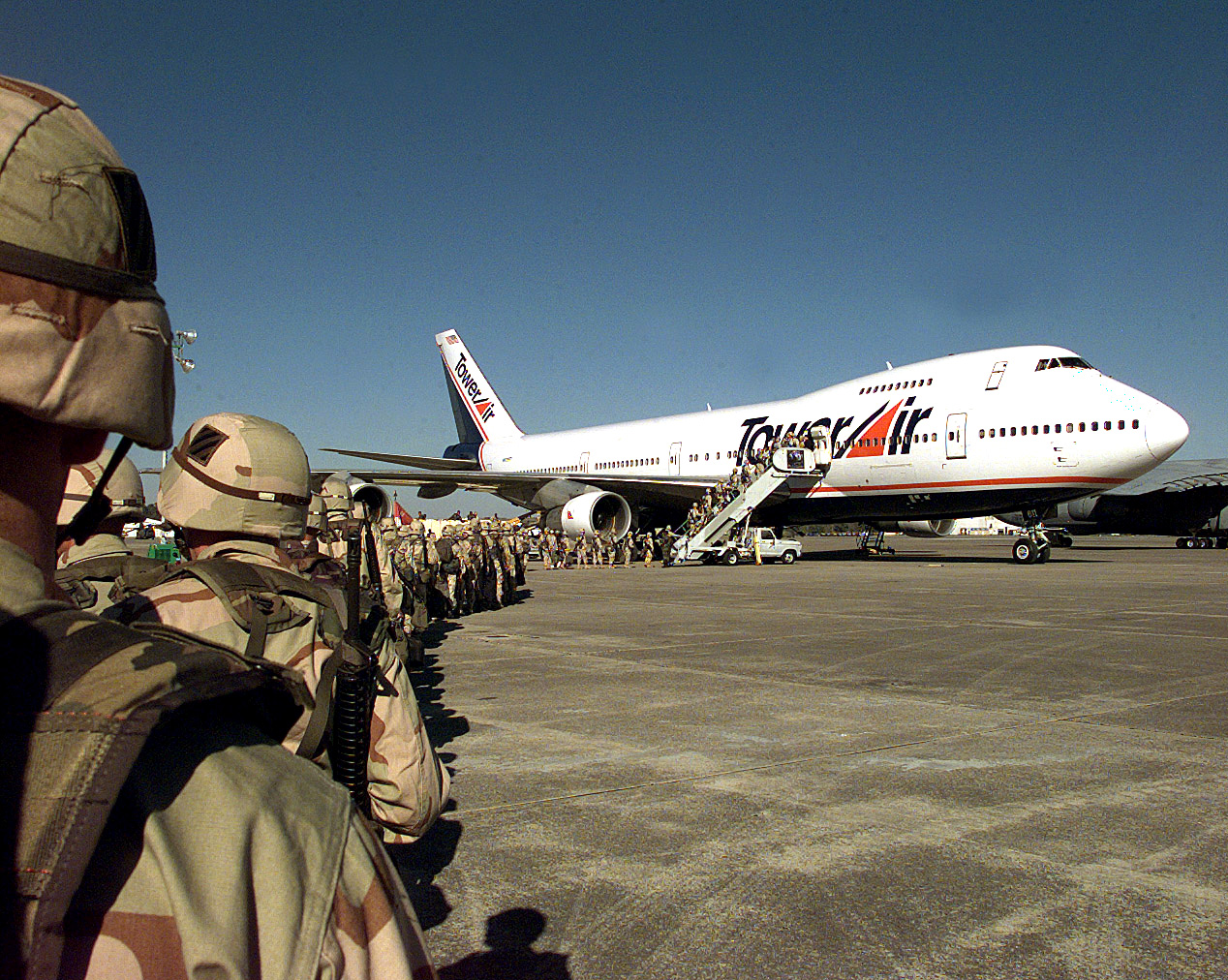
US Army soldiers line up to board a Tower Air charter flight from Hunter AAF during Operation Southern Watch in 1998.

During the 1990-91 Gulf War, Tower Air evacuated US citizens from Tel Aviv using the otherwise empty return legs of military charter flights to the region. It eventually became the only US carrier providing scheduled service to Israel in 1991, using special war risk insurance provided by the Federal Aviation Administration. It opened a special departure terminal at Ben Gurion Airport in 1997.

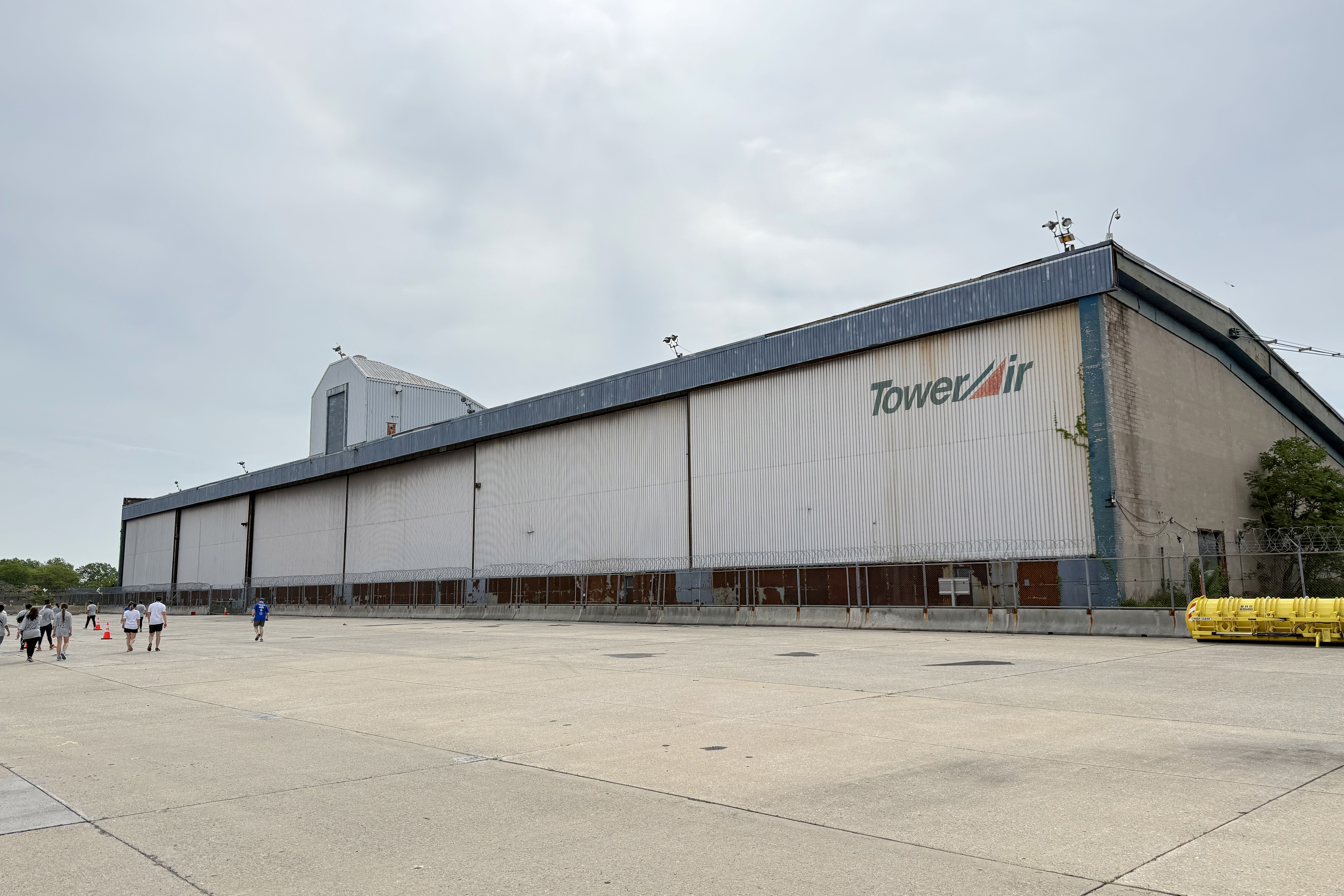
Hangar 17, a hangar previously used by Tower Air (including as its headquarters) at New York JFK Airport in 2025

The airline began running into financial and operational difficulties in the late 1990s. The airline lost $20 million in 1996. The 1997 Zagat Survey ranked Tower Air 59th out of 61 ranked carriers in terms of maintenance, ahead of only Valujet and Aeroflot, and in February 1998, the Federal Aviation Administration proposed two civil penalties totaling $276,000 for continuing to fly aircraft that required maintenance. The airline had attempted to cut costs by cannibalizing its own engines for spare parts, but was forced to borrow money to acquire new engines in 1998.

In January 1998 the FAA successfully sought to have the airline remove Guy Nachtomi, son of the Chairman and CEO, 24 years old at that time, from the position of Vice President-Operations. This was done in part because of the airline's maintenance problems, as well as his lack of airline experience (he worked at Twentieth Century Fox until 1994). The junior Mr. Nachtomi continued service with the company in a capacity unrelated to maintenance as Vice President-Office of the Chairman.

The Department of Defense Commercial Airlift Review Board suspended Tower Air military charters from January 27 to February 12, 1999, pending an on-site review of its operations. At the same time, the airline lost an arbitration brought by the Association of Flight Attendants, claiming that Tower Air was lodging their flight attendants in dirty Tel Aviv hotels with poor security and bed bugs.

By 2000, a majority of Tower Air's fleet (11 out of 19 aircraft) was out of service. Tower Air filed for protection under Chapter 11 bankruptcy on February 29, 2000, ceased all scheduled service on May 1, 2000 and surrendered their FAA air operator's certificate on November 28, 2000. The airline's bankruptcy trustee, Charles Stanziale, subsequently sued the airline's directors and officers for "driving the company into insolvency by indifference and egregious decision-making."

In 1997, a Boeing 747-200 US registration N618FF operated by Tower Air appeared in the movie Liar Liar. Its aircraft also appeared in the movie Turbulence (1997 film) the same year in their own livery and as the fictional Trans-Continental Airlines.

== Destinations ==
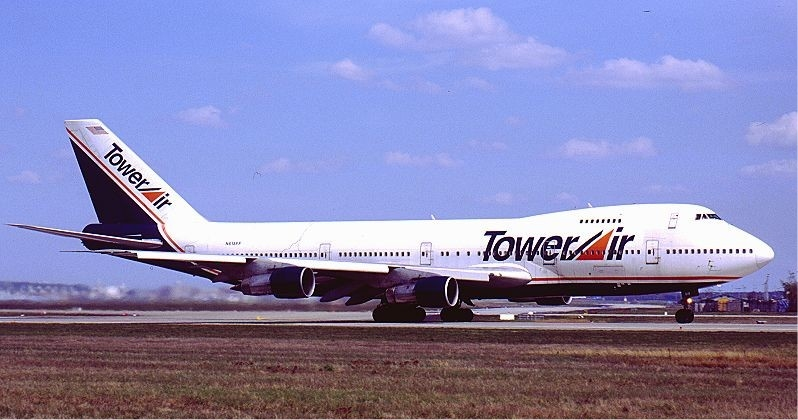
A Boeing 747-200 in Tower Air's livery.

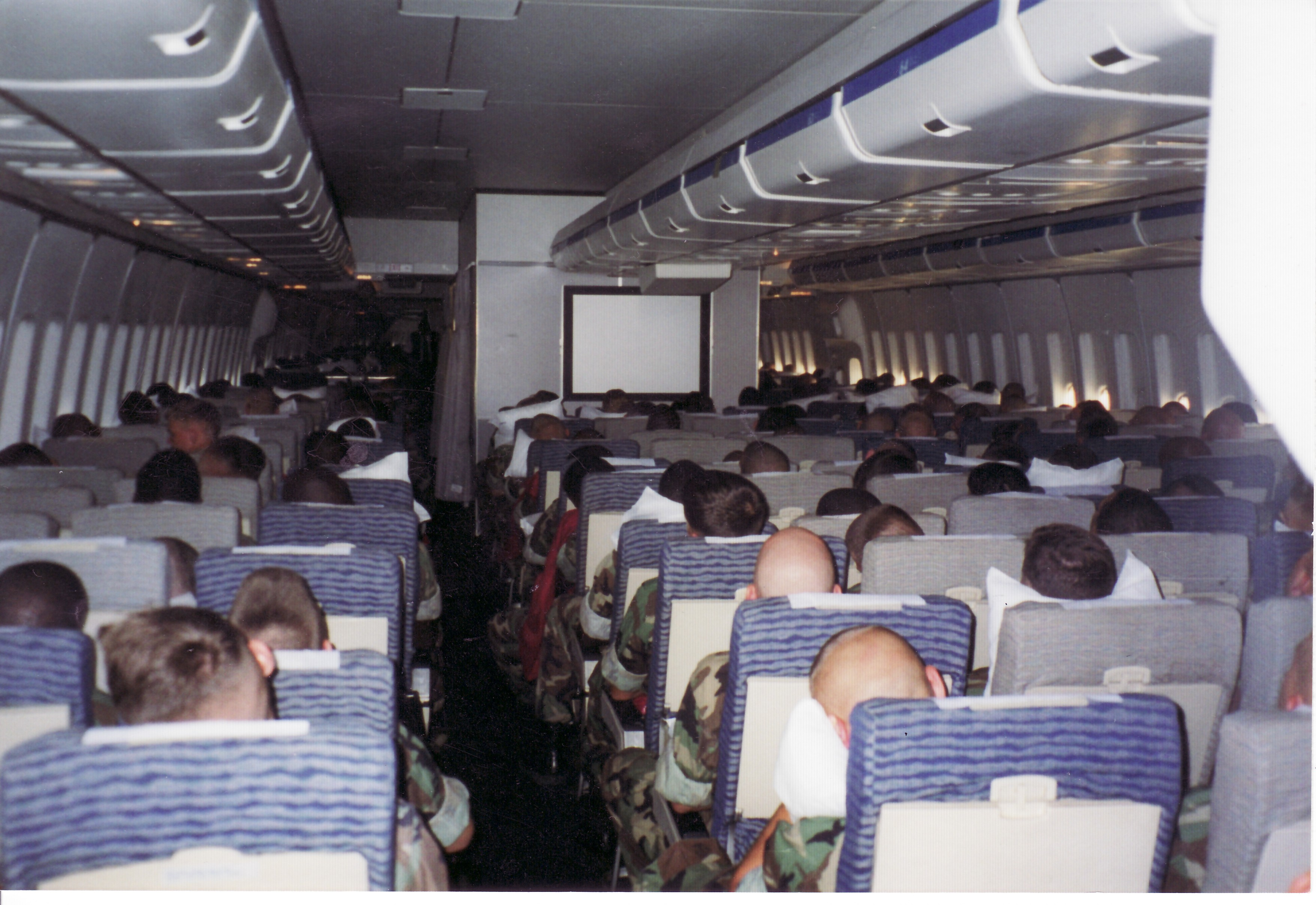
TowerAir Military (DOD) Charter Flight

=== Destinations at time of closure ===
- Israel
  - Tel Aviv - Ben Gurion Airport
- United States
  - Miami - Miami International Airport
  - New York City - John F. Kennedy International Airport Hub
  - San Juan - Luis Muñoz Marín International Airport

=== Destinations before closure ===
- Brazil
  - São Paulo - Guarulhos Airport
- Belgium
  - Brussels - Brussels Airport
- Denmark
  - Copenhagen - Copenhagen Airport (flights between New York and Copenhagen operated either nonstop or via Cologne)
- Dominican Republic
  - Santo Domingo - Las Américas International Airport
- France
  - Paris - Orly Airport
- Finland
  - Helsinki - Helsinki Airport
- Germany
  - Frankfurt - Frankfurt Airport
  - Berlin - Berlin Tempelhof Airport
  - Cologne - Cologne Bonn Airport
- Greece
  - Athens - Ellinikon International Airport
- India
  - Delhi - Indira Gandhi International Airport
  - Mumbai - Chhatrapati Shivaji Maharaj International Airport
- Ireland
  - Shannon - Shannon Airport
- Israel
  - Tel Aviv - Ben Gurion Airport (flights between New York and Tel Aviv operated via Brussels)
- Netherlands
  - Amsterdam - Amsterdam Airport Schiphol
- Norway
  - Oslo - Oslo Fornebu Airport
- Sweden
  - Stockholm - Stockholm Arlanda Airport
- United Kingdom
  - London - Gatwick Airport
- United States
  - Baltimore - Baltimore-Washington International Airport
  - Fort Lauderdale - Fort Lauderdale–Hollywood International Airport
  - Las Vegas - Harry Reid International Airport
  - Los Angeles - Los Angeles International Airport
  - Oakland - Oakland International Airport
  - San Francisco - San Francisco International Airport

According to the Official Airline Guide (OAG), in early 1989 Tower Air was operating transatlantic flights from both New York John F. Kennedy International Airport (JFK) and Miami (MIA) with nonstops between New York and Brussels, Copenhagen and Oslo with direct one stop service to and from Tel Aviv, and nonstops between Miami and Copenhagen, Oslo and Stockholm.

== Aircraft ==
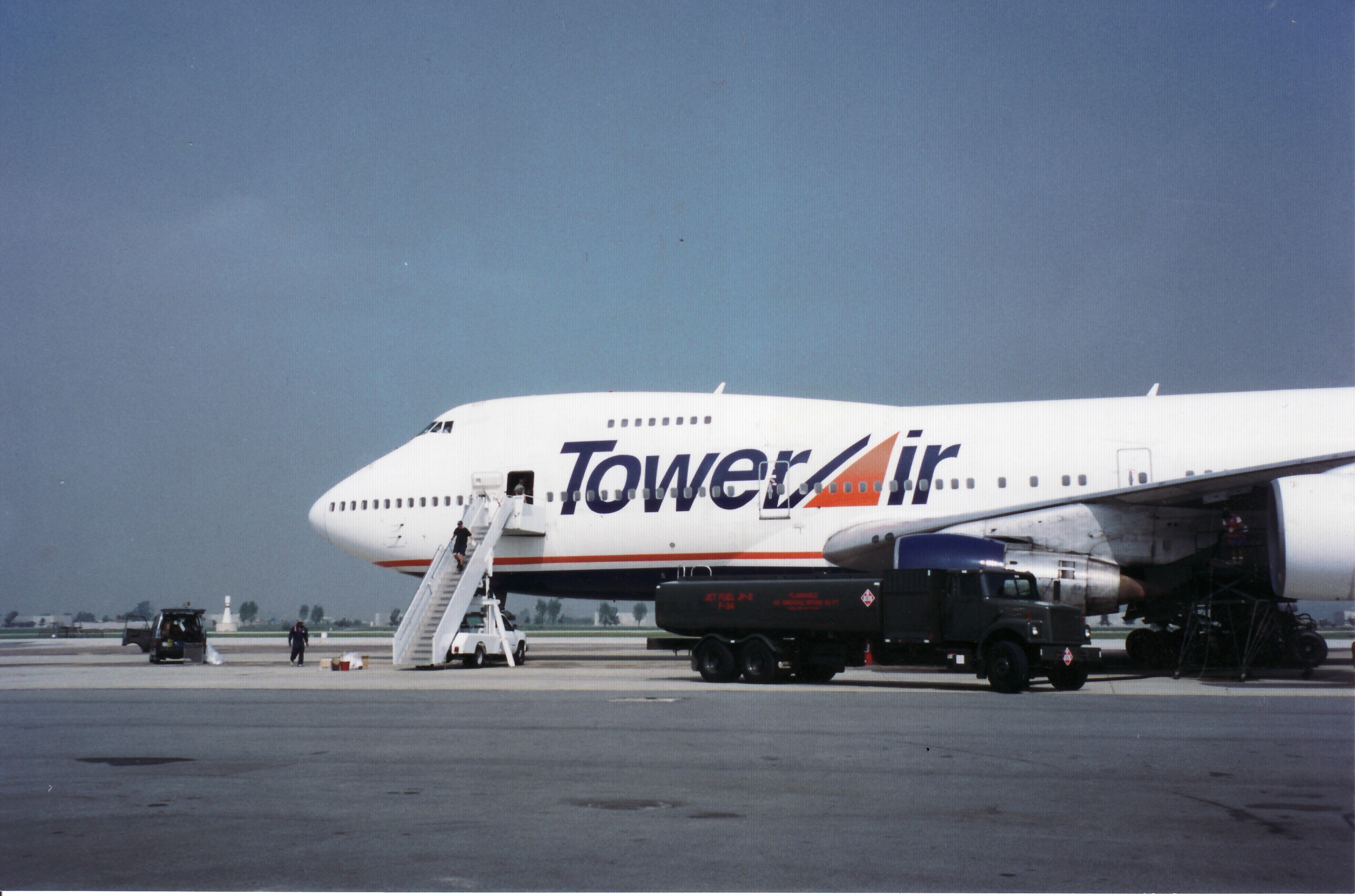
Tower Air Boeing 747

Tower Air's fleet consisted of Boeing 747s in both the −100 and −200 series, including both passenger and cargo aircraft. The airline operated a total of thirty 747s (fifteen −100 and fifteen −200 series) over its history. Several were converted to freighters following Tower's bankruptcy. One former Tower Air 747-200 was converted to a hotel, the Jumbo Stay at Stockholm Arlanda Airport.

== Incidents and accidents ==
On December 20, 1995, Tower Air Flight 41 from New York Kennedy to Miami veered off the runway during takeoff in a snowstorm resulting in one flight attendant receiving serious injuries and 24 passengers receiving minor injuries. The aircraft sustained heavy damage and was written off. The National Transportation Safety Board (NTSB) determined that the probable cause of this accident was the captain's failure to reject the takeoff in a timely manner when excessive nosewheel steering tiller inputs resulted in a loss of directional control on a slippery runway.

== See also ==
- List of defunct airlines of the United States
