= Knole =

English country house

Coordinates: 51.266°N 0.206°E

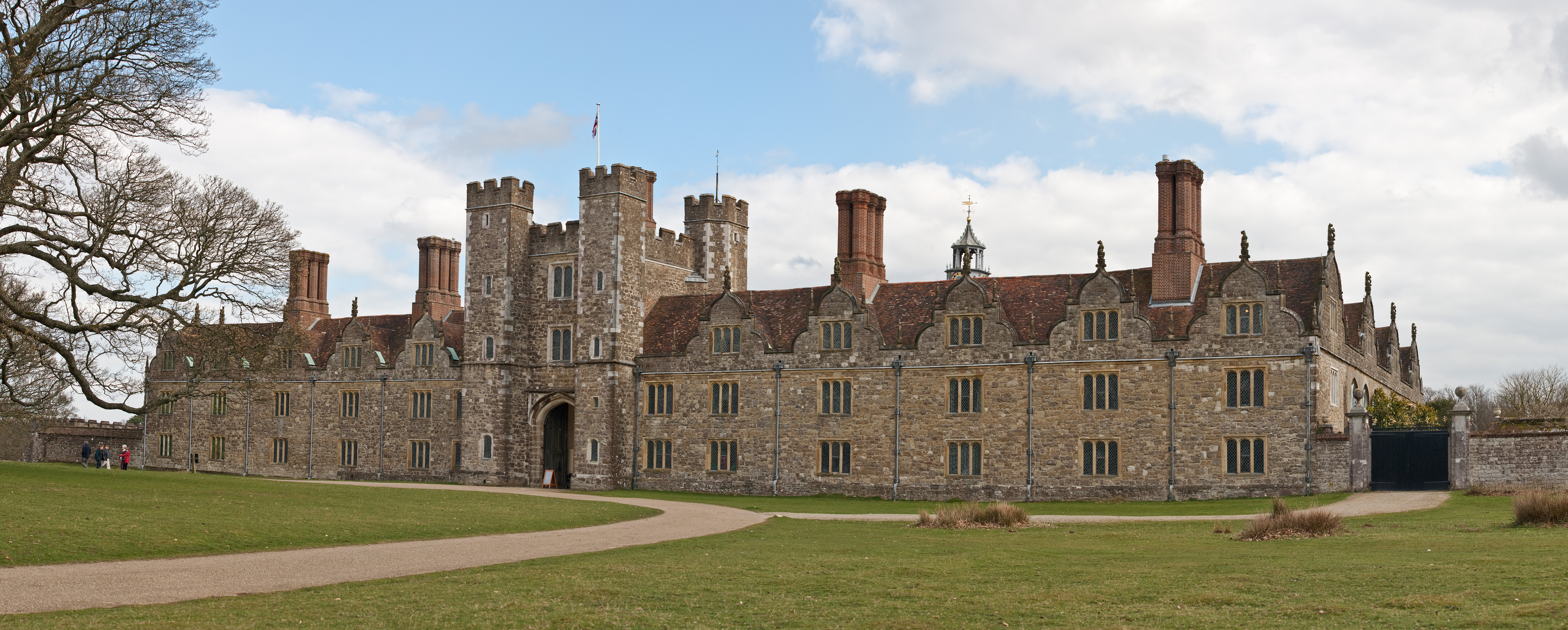
- Knole in 2009

- Location within Kent
- Type: Country house
- Location: TQ53955420

History
- Built: Mostly 1455–1608

Site notes
- Area: Kent
- Architectural styles: Jacobean architecture with other earlier and later styles
- Owner: National Trust

Listed Building – Grade I
- Official name: Knole
- Designated: 14 April 1951
- Reference no.: 1336390

National Register of Historic Parks and Gardens
- Official name: Knole
- Designated: 1 May 1986
- Reference no.: 1000183

Knole (/noʊl/) is an English country house and former archbishop's palace owned by the National Trust. It is situated within Knole Park, a 1,000-acre (400-hectare) park located immediately to the south-east of Sevenoaks in west Kent. The house ranks in the top five of England's largest houses, under any measure used, occupying a total of 4 acres (16,000 m^{2}; 170,000 sq ft).

The current house dates back to the mid-15th century, with major additions in the 16th and, particularly, the early 17th centuries. Its Grade I listing reflects its mix of late-medieval to Stuart structures and particularly its central façade and state rooms. In 2019, an extensive conservation project, "Inspired by Knole", was completed to restore and develop the structures of the buildings and thus help to conserve its important collections. The surrounding deer park has also survived with varying degrees of management in the 400 years since 1600.

== History ==
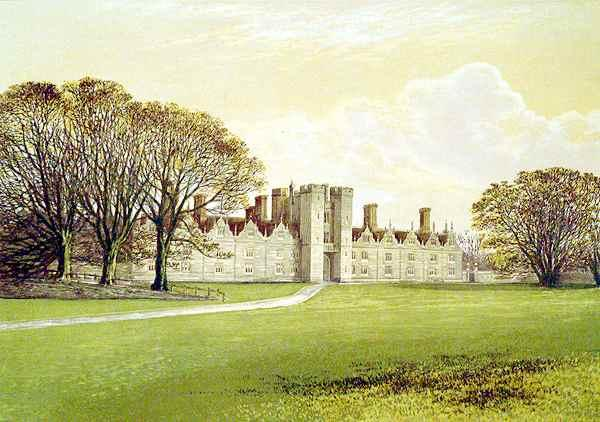
Knole in 1880

=== Location ===
Knole is located at the southern end of Sevenoaks, in the Weald of west Kent. To the north, the land slopes down to the Darenth valley and the narrow fertile pays of Holmesdale, at the foot of the North Downs. The land around Sevenoaks itself has sandy soils, with woodland that was used in the Middle Ages in the traditional Wealden way, for pannage, rough pasture and timber. The Knole estate is located on well-drained soils of the Lower Greensand. It was close enough to London to allow easy access for owners who were involved with affairs of state, and it was on "sounde, parfaite, holesome grounde", in the words of Henry VIII. It also had a plentiful supply of spring water.

The knoll of land in front of the house gives it a sheltered position. The wooded nature of the landscape could provide not only timber but also grazing for the meat needs of a grand household. Moreover, it made an excellent deer park, being emparked before the end of the 15th century. The dry valley between the house and the settlement of Sevenoaks also makes a natural deer course, for a combined race and hunt between two dogs and fallow deer.

=== Early history ===
There is evidence of the prehistoric at Knole but, as is the case for the surrounding area, no Roman. Much was going on in and around Sevenoaks in the medieval period and major landowners included Roger Bigod and then Otho de Grandison who moved abroad, his estates being broken up. It may be then that the Manor of Knole became a separate entity as the earliest reference to it currently known was not until 1364. In 1419, the estate, which then spread over 800 acres, had been bought by Thomas Langley, Bishop of Durham, and by 1429, he had extended it to 1,500 acres. The estate remained in the hands of the Langley family, it seems, until the mid-1440s when it had been acquired by James Fiennes, 1st Baron Saye and Sele. The circumstances of this transfer are not known, but it is clear that Lord Saye and Sele was also enlarging the estate by further, sometimes forcible, purchases of adjoining parcels of land. For example, in 1448 one Reginald Peckham was forced to sell land at Seal (at the north-eastern end of the current estate) to Saye "on threat of death". Forcible land transfers recur in the later history of the house, including that between Archbishop Thomas Cranmer and Henry VIII.

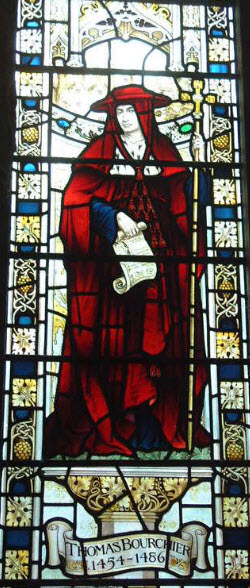
Thomas Cardinal Bourchier, Archbishop of Canterbury

Lord Saye and Sele seems to have begun a building project at Knole, but it was incomplete by his death in 1450. His ruthless exploitation of his powerful position in Kent was a motivating factor in the Jack Cade Rebellion. Saye and Sele was executed on the authority of a hastily assembled commission initiated by Henry VI in response to the demands of Cade's rebels when they arrived in London.

=== Archbishop Bourchier's House ===
James Fiennes's heir, William, second Baron Saye and Sele, sold the property for 400 marks (£266 13s 4d) in 1456 to Thomas Bourchier, Archbishop of Canterbury. He already had a substantial property in the area, Otford Palace, but the drier, healthier site of Knole attracted him. Archbishop Bourchier probably began building work by making substantial renovations of an existing house. Between 1456 and 1486, Bourchier and his bailiff for the Otford bailiwick, John Grymesdyche, oversaw substantial building work on the current house. The remodelled house must have been suitable for the archbishop by 1459, when he first stayed there, but he based himself there increasingly in his later years, particularly after 1480, when, at the age of about 69, he appointed a suffragan. In 1480, Thomas Cardinal Bourchier, as he had become in 1473, gave the house to the Archdiocese of Canterbury.

In subsequent years, Knole House continued to be enlarged, with the addition of a large courtyard, now known as Green Court, and a new entrance tower. These were long thought to be the work of one of Bourchier's successors, but the detailed study by Alden Gregory suggests that Bourchier was responsible. He took advantage of the political stability that followed the restoration of Edward IV in 1471 to invest further in his property.

=== Knole in the Tudor period ===
After Cardinal Bourchier's death in 1486, Knole was occupied by the next four archbishops: John Morton (1487–1500), Henry Deane (1501–1503), William Warham (1504–1532) and finally Thomas Cranmer. Sir Thomas More appeared in revels there at the court of Archbishop Morton, whose cognizance (motto) of Benedictus Deus appears above and to either side of a large late Tudor fireplace there. Henry VII was an occasional visitor, as in early October and midwinter 1490.

Cardinal Bourchier had enclosed the park with a pale to make a deer park and it seems that Henry VIII used to visit Archbishop Warham to hunt deer. After the death of Warham and before the appointment of his successor, Henry found his properties in nearby Otford and Knole useful residences for his daughter Mary, at the time of the protracted divorce from her mother, Catherine of Aragon. She was at Knole from 27 November 1532 to 5 March 1533.

Warham's successor as archbishop, Thomas Cranmer, acquired all the temporalities of the See of Canterbury. However, these brought with them substantial debts and complex demands of land management, set against a backdrop of massive land transfers associated with the dissolution of the monasteries and broader assaults on church wealth. Cranmer was, therefore, unable to withstand repeated demands from Henry VIII for exchanges of land. This was a long-term process stretching between 1536 and 1546, so that there is no need to imagine that Henry wanted Knole, specifically, for example as a deer park. In 1537 the manor of Knole, and five other manors and a number of advowsons and chantries largely forming the archbishop's bailiwick of Otford, were 'exchanged' with Henry VIII. In return, Cranmer received a package primarily consisting of former abbeys and priories between Canterbury and Dover.

Knole was granted to Edward Seymour, 1st Duke of Somerset, in August 1547 at the start of his nephew Edward VI's reign, but following Somerset's execution in 1549 it reverted to the Crown. Mary gave the residence back to her Archbishop of Canterbury, Cardinal Reginald Pole, but with their deaths in 1558 the house reverted to the Crown.

In the early 1560s, Elizabeth I gave Knole to Robert Dudley, 1st Earl of Leicester, but he returned it in 1566. However, he had already granted a lease (1 February 1566) to one Thomas Rolf. Under this the 'manor and mansion-house' of Knole and the park, with the deer, and also Panthurst Park and other lands, were demised to the latter for the term of ninety-nine years at a rent of £200. The landlord was to do all repairs, and reserved the very unusual right (to himself and his heirs and assigns) to occupy the mansion-house as often as he or they chose to do so, but this right did not extend to the gate-house, nor to certain other premises. The tenant was given power to alter or rebuild the mansion-house at his pleasure. Meanwhile, Elizabeth had possibly granted the estate to her cousin Thomas Sackville who, at that time, had the title of Lord Buckhurst.

There was competition at that time for the Knole estate. Rolf died very soon after, and the residue of the lease was bought by a wealthy local lawyer, John Lennard (of Chevening). He had gradually built up a network of properties around Sevenoaks, including the manor of Chevening, and adjoining property in the parishes of Knockholt and Halstead, all just to the north of Sevenoaks. Lennard had already pressured Rolf to sell the lease before his sudden death but, at the same point, Lord Buckhurst was also competing for the lease. Knole was a significant addition to Lennard's local land-holdings when it was confirmed, around 1570. However, Buckhurst was still able to insist upon some rights on the estate, including the ownership of at least some of the deer in the park. John moved to Knole, but gave his son Sampson, Lord Dacre's son-in-law, a sub-lease. The Knole estate was worth a great deal to Sampson, bringing him in 1599 rents worth £218, 6s and 8d.

One of Sampson Lennard's daughters, Margaret, married Sir Thomas Waller, at one time lieutenant of Dover Castle and the younger son of an important Kent family, with their seat at Groombridge. An unusual term in the marriage covenant stipulated that Margaret and Thomas should live at Knole which is where Margaret gave birth to her son William, probably in 1598. The baptism is recorded in the Sevenoaks parish register for 3 December. In 1613, William inherited his father's baronetcy, becoming Sir William Waller. He later commanded a parliamentary army with some distinction during the English Civil War.

=== Early-Stuart Knole and the Sackvilles ===
Since Dudley had originally granted a 99-year lease, Thomas Sackville could only take it back by buying out the remaining 51 years of the lease for £4,000, which he did in 1603. Lennard was happy to sell, not only because of his mounting debts but also because he wished to gain the Dacre title, which he did in 1604 from a commission headed by the Lord Treasurer, Thomas Sackville. This is unlikely to have been a coincidence. Sackville's descendants, the Earls and Dukes of Dorset and Barons Sackville, have owned or lived in the property ever since.

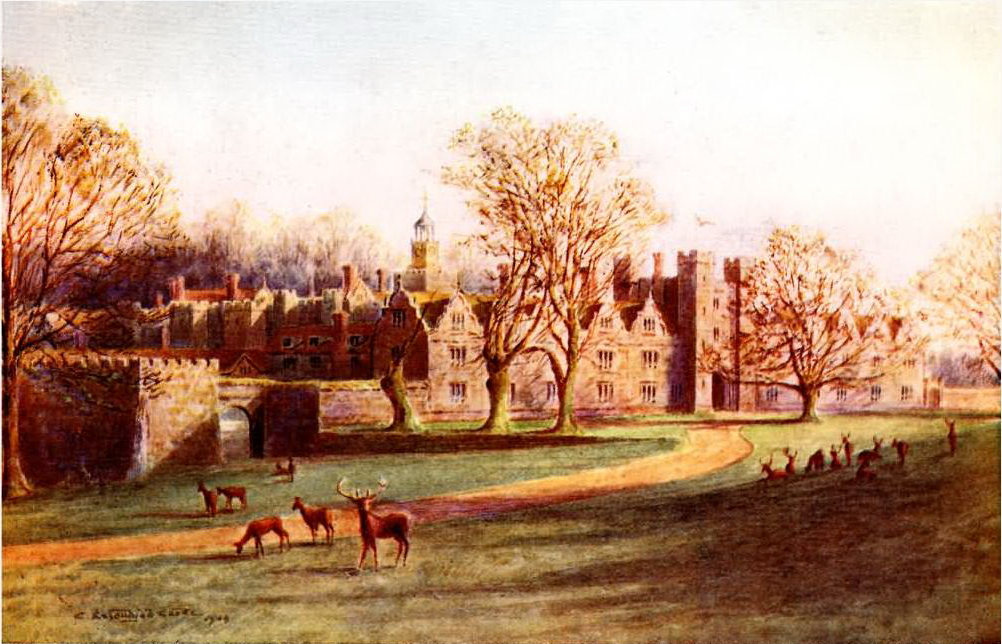
North West Front, Knole, Sevenoaks

Thomas Sackville, at that time Lord Buckhurst, had considered a number of other sites to build a house commensurate with his elevated status in court and government. However, he could not overlook the multiple advantages of Knole: a good supply of spring water (rare for a house on a hill), plentiful timber, a deer park and close enough proximity to London. He immediately began a large building programme. This was supposed to have been completed within two years, employing some 200 workmen, but the partially-surviving accounts show that there was continuing, vast expenditure even in 1608–1609. Since Sackville had had a distinguished career at court under Elizabeth and then been appointed Lord High Treasurer to James VI and I, he had the resources to undertake such a programme. Perhaps, with his renovations to the state rooms at Knole, Sackville hoped to receive a visit by the King, but this does not seem to have occurred and the lord treasurer himself died during the building work, in April 1608, at the age of about 72.

Thomas Sackville's Jacobean great house, like others such as Hatfield and Audley End, have been called "monuments to private greed". Unlike any surviving English great house apart from Haddon Hall, Knole today still looks as it did when Thomas died, having managed "to remain motionless like this since the early 17th century, balanced between growth and decay."

Thomas's son, Robert Sackville, 2nd Earl of Dorset, took over the titles and estates, gave a description of his father's work on re-modelling Knole: "late re-edified wth a barne, stable, dovehouse and other edifices, together wth divers Courts, the gardens orchards and wilderness invironed wth a stone wall, well planted wth choise frute, and beawtified wth ponds, and manie other pleasureable delights and devises are situate wthin the Parke of knoll, the charge of new building of the said house and making planting and furnishing of the said ponds yards gardens orchards and wilderness about Seaven yeares past Thirty thosand pounds at the least yet exstant uppon Accounpts. All wch are now in the Earle of dorsetts owne occupacon and are worth to bee sold."

The 2nd earl did not enjoy Knole for long, since he died in January 1609. His two sons, in turn, inherited the title and estates, first Richard Sackville, 3rd Earl of Dorset (1589–1624) and then the much more politically significant Edward Sackville, 4th Earl of Dorset (1590–1652). None of these earls lived permanently at Knole. In the first earl's case, this was no doubt due to the renovations. The third earl lived mostly at court, though he is known to have kept his hunting horses and hounds there.

The wife of the 3rd Earl, Lady Anne Clifford, lived at Knole for a time during the couple's conflict over her inheritance from her father, George Clifford, 3rd Earl of Cumberland. A catalogue of the household of the Earl and Countess of Dorset at Knole from this time survives. It records the names and roles of servants and indicates where they sat at dinner. The list includes two African servants, Grace Robinson, a maid in the laundry, and John Morockoe, who worked in the kitchen. Both are described as "Blackamoors". In 1623, a large part of Knole House burnt down.

=== Knole during the Civil War, Commonwealth and Restoration ===
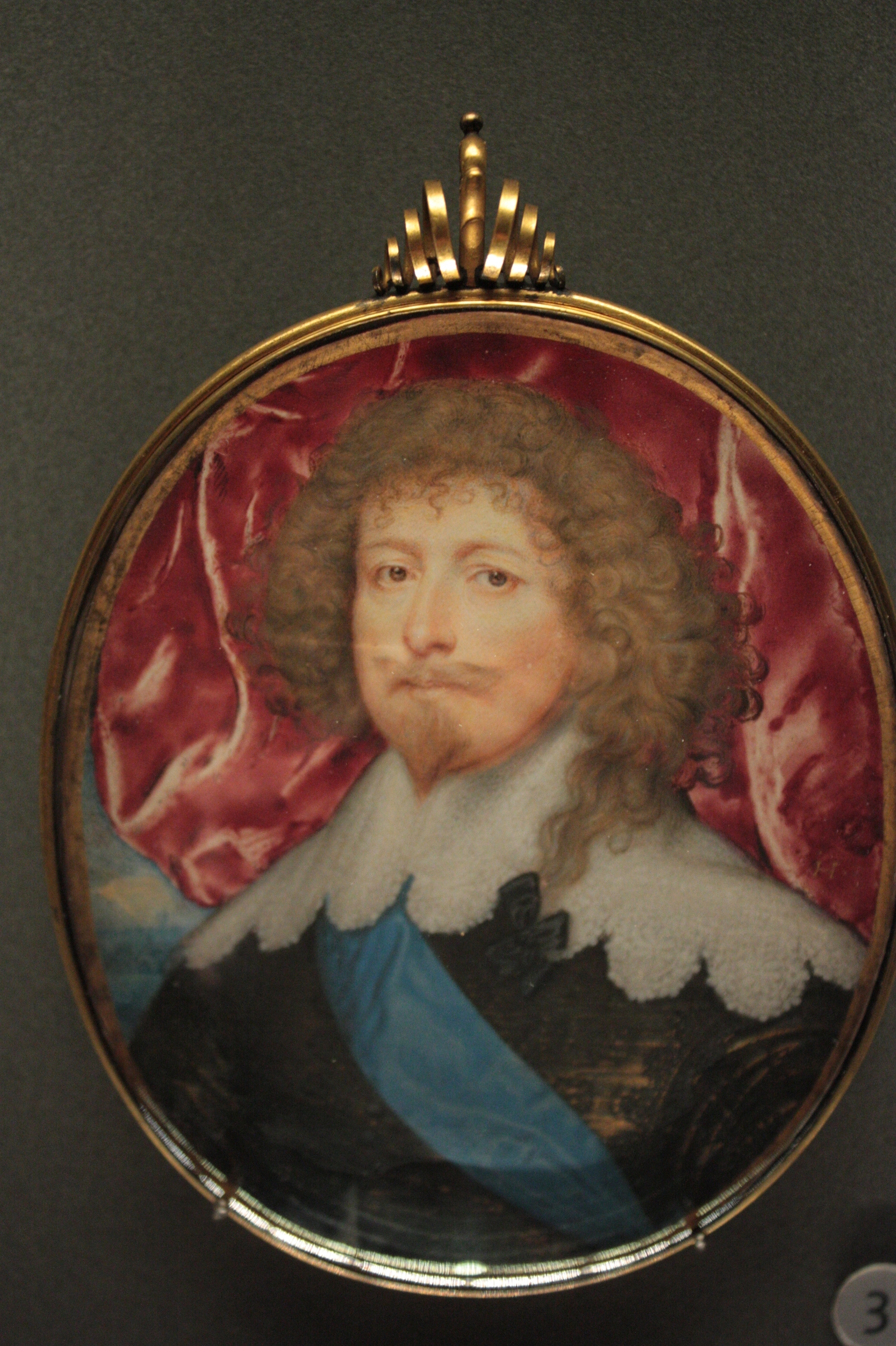
Edward Sackville, in a miniature by John Hoskins, 1635

Edward, a relatively moderate royalist, was away from Knole in the summer of 1642, when he and his cousin and factotum Sir John Sackville fell under suspicion of stockpiling arms and preparing local men to fight for Charles I during the Civil War. The rumours of the cache of arms reached Parliament in an intercepted letter for which Sir John was notionally the source. On Sunday 14 August 1642, Parliament sent three troops of horse under Colonel Edwin Sandys, a member of a Kentish puritan family, to seize these arms from Knole. Sir John was in the congregation for the parish Sunday service and Sandys waited with his troops outside the church until it had finished. Local people tried to rescue him but they quickly judged that the troops were too strong for them, and Sir John was arrested and taken to the Fleet prison.

Sandys's troops then moved to Knole where, according to the earl of Dorset's steward, they caused damage to the value of £186, and 'The Armes they have wholie taken awaie there being five wagenloads of them (sic passim).' In fact, the arms were largely of more interest to antiquarians than to soldiers; they included, for example, thirteen 'old French pistolls whereof four have locks [and] the other nine have none'. Sandys claimed that he had seized 'compleat armes for 500 or 600 men', but this is untrue. Nevertheless, the House of Lords resolved that 'such [arms] as are fit to be made use of for the Service of the Kingdom are to be employed'. In addition, the House was sequestrated. Edward accepted the seizures and damage to Knole as an inevitable part of the Civil War, as he explained in a speech to Charles I and his peers in Oxford, in 1642: 'For my particular, in these wars I have suffered as much as any, my Houses have been searcht, my Armes taken thence, and my sonne and heire committed to prison; yet I shall wave these discourtesies, because I know there was a necessity they should be so.'

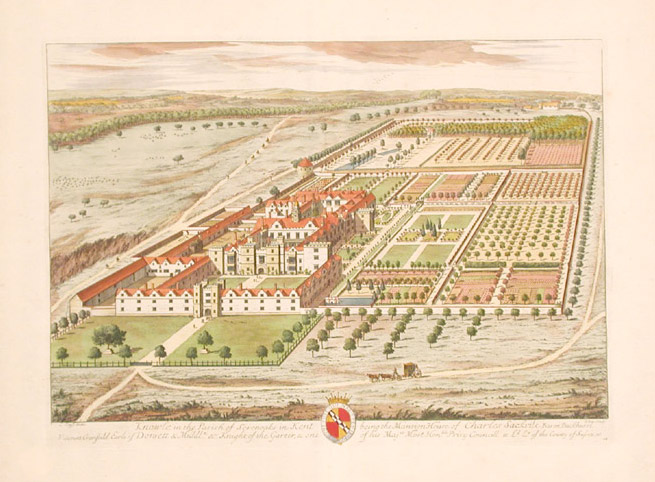
Knole from Kip and Knyff's Britannia Illustrata (1709)

Parliament established County Committees to govern the counties under its control. For the first 12 to 18 months of its operation, the Kent Committee was based at Knole, until its obvious disadvantage, being at one end of a very large county, led to its removal first to Aylesford and then to Maidstone. Apart from the committee, the county treasury was based here, along with a bodyguard of between 75 and 150 men and the so-called 'Household'. To provision its varied occupants, the Committee not only used the Knole estate but also rented fields from local landowners, including, surprisingly, Lady Sackville (Sir John's wife). Some accounts for the period survive. They show, for example, a gift of a few pounds to goodman Skinner for 'looking to Knole Parkgate.' Other expenditure was seen as much more extravagant, including £3091 for the Household, called the 'seraglio' by local enemies. Committee meetings were held in the room now known as Poets' Parlour where, in addition to using the existing furnishings, £153 was spent on sheets, table linen and carpets and £22 on silverware, candlesticks, glasses, jugs and drinking horns. Additional beds were also brought from Kippington, Thomas Farnaby's sequestered house from the other side of Sevenoaks. One indication of the religious issues involved in the War is shown from the expenditure of £1 17s 4d for the 'carpenters and others employed in taking away the rails and levelling the ground in the chapel at Knole'. Nevertheless, the committee had moved to Aylesford Priory before April 1645.

When Edward Sackville died in 1652, his son Richard inherited not only the earldom, but estates in substantial debt, not least owing to fines imposed by Parliament for his father's role in the Civil War. He practised quiet retrenchment, despite taking part in some public work following the Restoration of Charles II, including membership of the commission for the trial of the regicides. However, his marriage to Lady Frances Cranfield, daughter of Lionel Cranfield, was important for Knole. When her brother died, she inherited the Middlesex estates, including Copt Hall in Essex. Richard died at Knole on 27 August 1677. but his son, Charles Sackville, 6th Earl of Dorset (1643–1706), sold Copt Hall in 1701. Many of the contents were then moved to Knole, substantially enriching the collection. These include the copies by Daniel Mytens of the Raphael Cartoons and many portraits and pieces of furniture. Along with John Sackville, 3rd Duke of Dorset (1745–1799), Charles can now be seen as one of the two principal collectors responsible for the remarkable holdings of Knole House.

Charles was an important figure in the late Stuart court; Vita Sackville-West calls him 'one of the most jovial and debonair figures in the Knole portrait-gallery.' He was a poet and patron who became Charles II's lord chamberlain and 'unofficial minister of the arts', with the 'poets' parlour' in Knole becoming a venue for literary society to converse. After 1688, John Dryden ceased to be poet laureate, owing to his catholic views which meant he refused the oath of allegiance to William and Mary. Charles stood by him with generous gifts of money, despite Dryden's bitterness about his treatment at court. On one occasion, dining at Knole, Dryden found a hundred-pound note under his plate. Not only Dryden but several other poets of the age appear to have been guests at Knole. The so-called 'Poet's Parlour' is today part of the private Sackville-West family apartments at Knole.

As the heir to the earl of Middlesex's estates, he obtained the new creation earl of Middlesex in 1674. In January 1688, his son, Lionel Sackville, was born at Knole. When Charles died in 1706, Lionel inherited.

=== Knole since 1700 ===
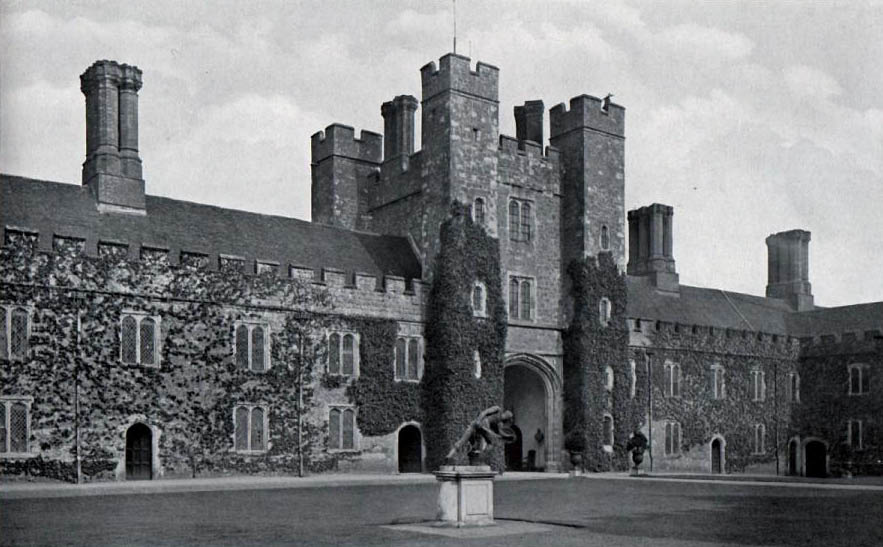
The Green Court at Knole

Lionel Sackville was a key supporter of the Hanoverian Succession and was rewarded by George I with the Order of the Garter in 1714 and the dukedom of Dorset in 1720. In 1730, Sir Robert Walpole appointed him lord lieutenant of Ireland. Much later, in 1757, he was attacked in Knole Park by a mob protesting against the Militia Bill. However, he was saved by the arrival of a small cavalry force and died peacefully in Knole House in 1765. His wife, Elizabeth, had been a maid of honour to Queen Anne. Her great friend, Lady Elizabeth Germain, lived at Knole for such a long time that her bedroom, sitting room and china closet are, to this day, named after her.

Lionel's son, Charles Sackville, 2nd Duke of Dorset, only survived his father by four years, but his grandson John Sackville, 3rd Duke of Dorset was a much more significant character for Knole. An avid collector with the means to satisfy his acquisitiveness, he not only brought back various old masters from his Grand Tour in 1770, but also became a discerning patron for contemporary artists. Sir Joshua Reynolds painted a full-length portrait and the Duke also acquired several other paintings by Reynolds, eleven of which are still on display in the Reynolds Room.

John Frederick's only son, George Sackville, 4th Duke of Dorset, died in 1815 aged 21, and Knole was then left by the third Duke's widow in 1825 to their daughter Mary, Countess of Plymouth. She died childless in 1864, leaving it to her sister Elizabeth Sackville-West, Countess De La Warr and her heirs male. It ultimately passed to the latter's fourth son, Mortimer Sackville-West, 1st Baron Sackville, and thence to his successors. However, Lord Sackville's resources were insufficient to maintain the house and its possessions. He began selling a number of the heirlooms to enable him to keep the estate going.

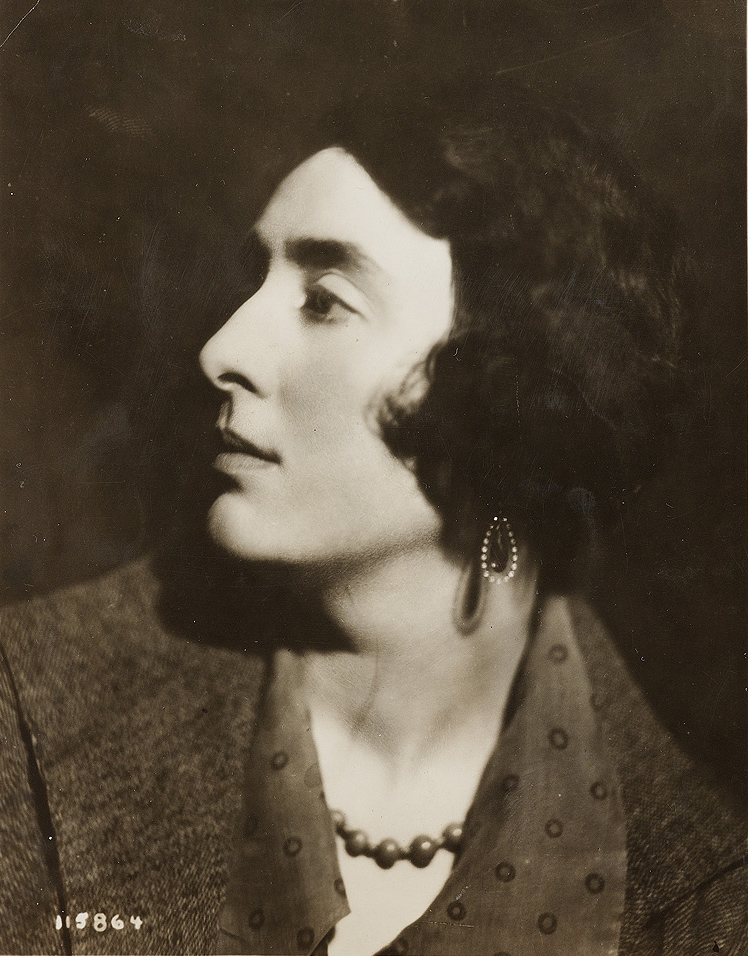
Vita Sackville-West, in 1926

The Sackville-West descendants included writer Vita Sackville-West. Her Knole and the Sackvilles, published 1922, is regarded as a classic in the literature of English country houses. Its rather romantic style is sometimes of dubious historical accuracy but it is based upon full access to the manuscripts and books at that time in the House's collection, though many are now in the Kent County Archives (originally at the Centre for Kentish Studies; hence CKS in some catalogue records, and now at the Kent History and Library Centre) in Maidstone.

It was soon after this book's publication, in December 1922, that Vita first met Virginia Woolf who, became a friend and, for a while in the later 1920s, her lover. Woolf wrote Orlando over the winter of 1927–1928, an experimental, though accessible, novel which drew on the history of the house and Sackville-West's ancestors, particularly as presented in Vita's book. The Sackville family custom of following the Salic rules of primogeniture was to prevent Vita from inheriting Knole upon the death of her father Lionel Sackville-West, 3rd Baron Sackville (1867–1928). As she was not philoprogenitive, this was as well, but the thought hung heavily on her at this time. Woolf gave her a fantastical version of Knole and, when Vita had read it, she wrote to Virginia, 'You made me cry with your passages about Knole, you wretch.' This sentiment may be heightened by the uses of Vita as a historical model for some of the photos in the original Hogarth edition. Three of these are, in fact, adapted from pictures at Knole: 'Orlando as a boy' from the young Edward Sackville in the double portrait; 'Archduchess Harriet' from a picture of Mary, fourth countess of Somerset in Lord Sackville's private collection and 'Orlando as Ambassador' from a portrait of Lionel Sackville, the first duke of Dorset by Rosalba Carriera. On her father's death in 1928, the house and estate went to Lionel's younger brother, Charles (1870–1962). However, if Vita had to leave Knole, Orlando remained; the original manuscript of what Vita's son, Nigel Nicolson called, 'the longest and most charming love-letter in literature' is there. It is perhaps fairer to see it as a work of consolation to Vita, though it is one that also contains a number of barbed comments about Knole and the Sackvilles, with its altered versions of letters and lists:
Already – it is an effect lists have upon us – we are beginning to yawn. But if we stop, it is only that the catalogue is tedious, not that it is finished. There are ninety-nine pages more of it ... . And so on and so on.

== Art and architecture ==
=== House ===
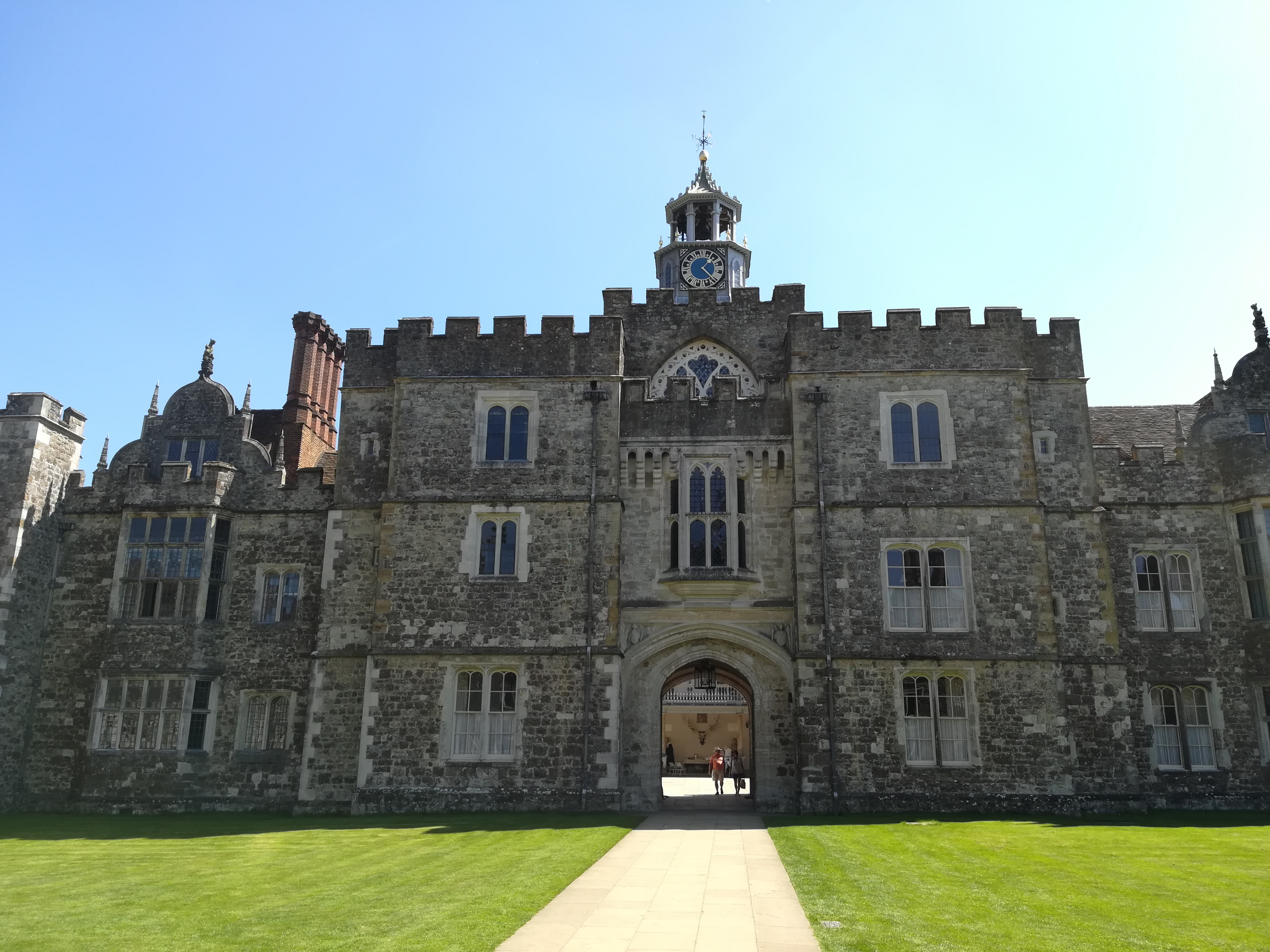
Bourchier's Tower in the Green Court in 2018

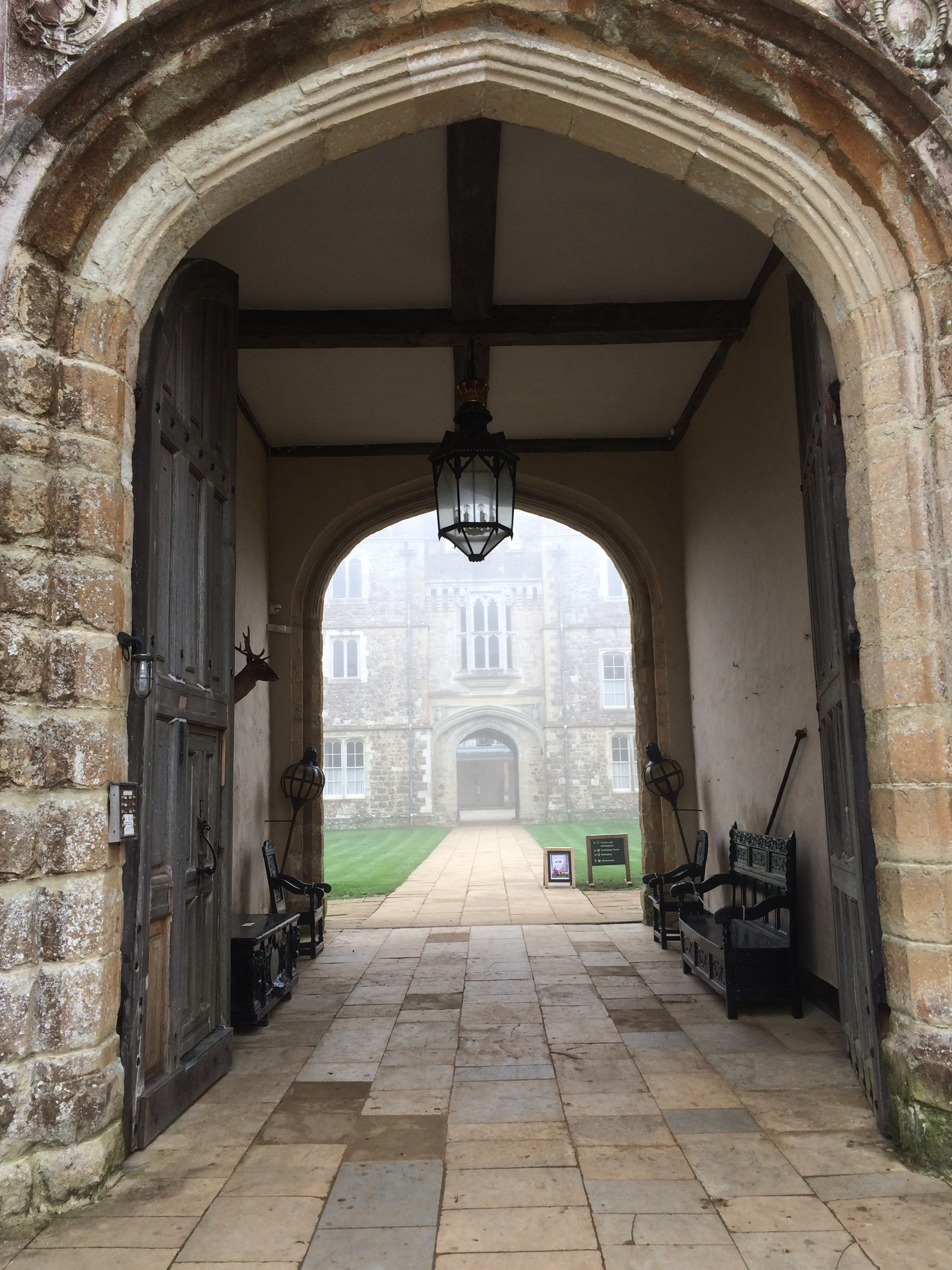
Main Gateway, April 2018

Although its complex history reveals Knole to have been the result of many periods of development, its national importance is primarily for its 17th-century structure. As A. P. Newton puts it:

Knole is neither sublime nor picturesque. It is, however, especially in the distant view, authentic, looking almost exactly now as it did in the year Thomas Sackville died... . No English great house but Haddon has managed to remain motionless like this since the early-seventeenth century, balanced between growth and decay.

At the time of Sackville's rebuilding, little notice was taken of his work. It was not at the forefront of architectural development and, in 1673, John Evelyn called it '‘a great old fashioned house', quite unlike the classical style favoured by Inigo Jones and also illustrated by Thomas Howard, 1st Earl of Suffolk's almost contemporary rebuilding of Audley End. Knole may no longer look much like Bourchier's late-medieval house, but it can still give the impression of a sombre, squat, complex of houses, not least thanks to its use of the dark Kentish ragstone. However, Edward Town asserts its importance, arguing that 'what Sackville achieved at Knole was a remarkable synthesis of what was inherited from the existing fabric and what was newly built.' He had taken a great, late-medieval house for a series of archbishops of Canterbury, usually among the most powerful men in the state, which had already experienced other changes of function and occupancy during the sixteenth century, and made it a Jacobean country house. Sackville recommended the "very excellent surveyor" John Thorpe to survey and make "plots" in 1605 for the rebuilding of Ampthill for Anne of Denmark and Henry Frederick, Prince of Wales, and may have employed him on his own building projects.

Beyond the Jacobean façade, plentiful evidence still exists of the earlier house. One of the main surviving elements is the northern range of Stone Court. The upper floors contain a series of high-status apartments, and these are demonstrated by a number of structural features, such as the series of large garderobe towers protruding on the north side and the cellars below, which contain some late-15th-century wall paintings.

In 2013, Knole was granted £7.75m by the Heritage Lottery Fund for conservation and repair work to the House. As part of this work, in 2014, archaeologists found that the late-medieval wall and roof timbers, and the oak beams beneath floors, particularly near fireplaces, had been scorched and carved with scratched marks. Initial media coverage focused on these being apotropaic marks, or "witch marks", to prevent witches and demons from coming down the chimney. This is one of a series of possible interpretations of such marks, which are now being found increasingly on medieval and renaissance building across England, including at Sissinghurst. However, all interpretations suggest they were apotropaic rituals to ward off fire damage or evil spirits. Since many of these are late-medieval marks, covered up during the early-17th-century rebuilding of Knole, it is fanciful to link them to James I's interest in witchcraft, particularly since, after the publication of his book Daemonologie (1597), he later became much more sceptical about the existence of witches.

=== Rooms ===
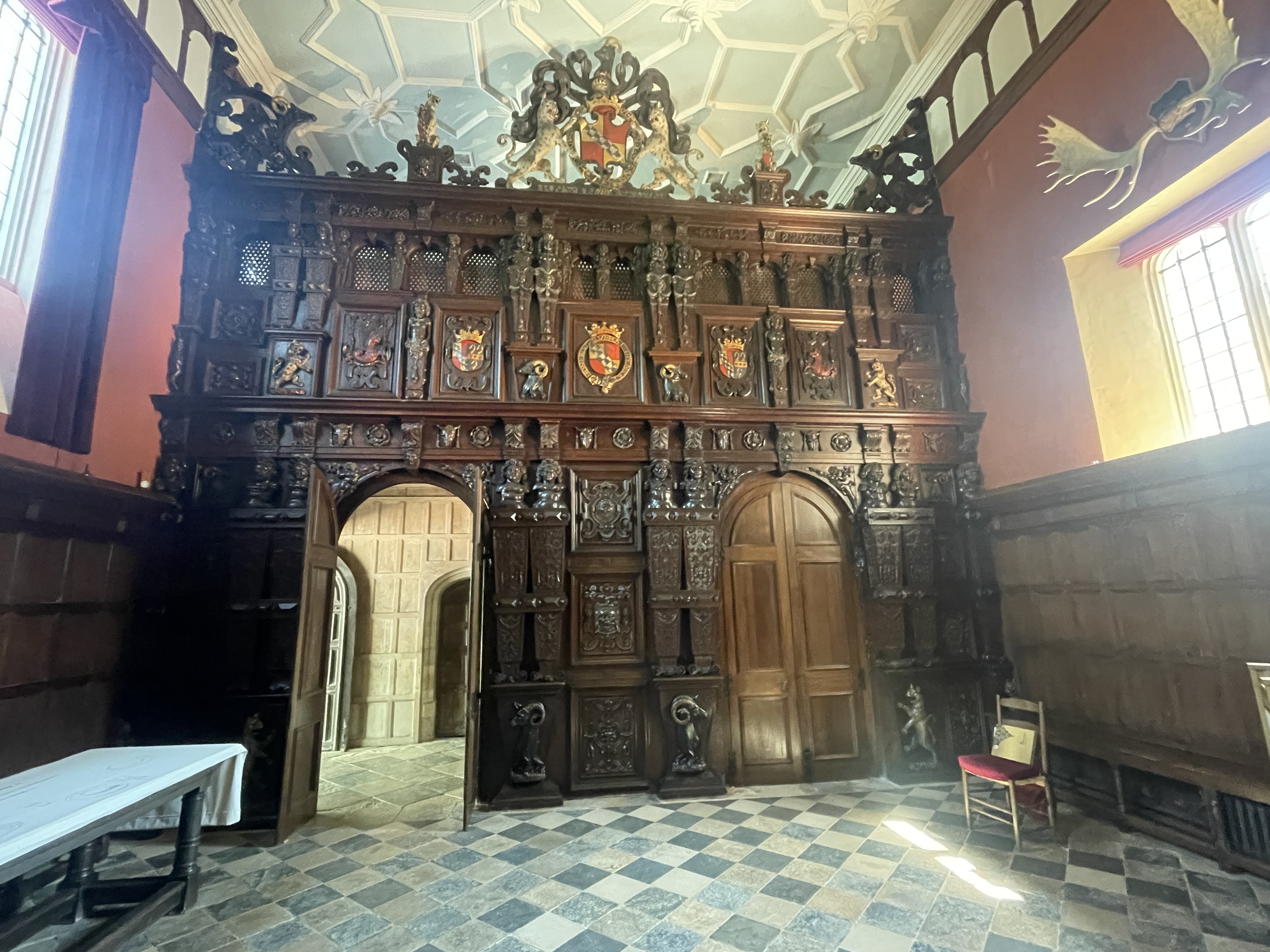
Richly carved oak screen in the Great Hall was designed by William Portington, master carpenter to Elizabeth I and James I

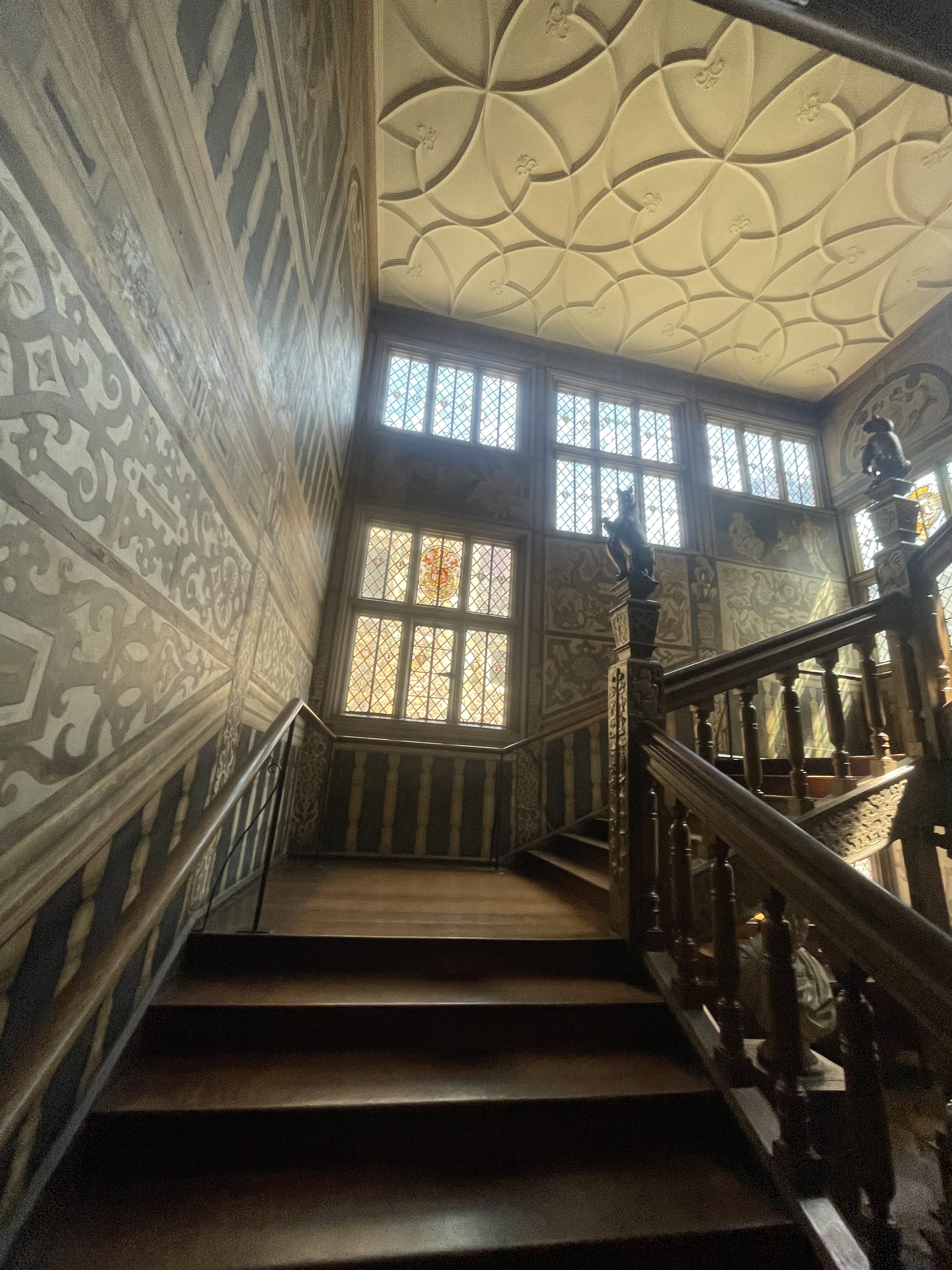
The Great Staircase, like the Great Hall, was entirely remodelled by the First Earl of Dorset in 1605-1608

The many state rooms open to the public contain a collection of 17th-century royal Stuart furniture, perquisites from the 6th Earl's service as Lord Chamberlain to William III in the royal court. These include three state beds, silver furniture (comprising a pair of torchieres, mirror and dressing table, being rare survivors of this type), outstanding tapestries and textiles, and the Knole Settee. The art collection includes portraits by Anthony van Dyck, Thomas Gainsborough, Sir Peter Lely, Sir Godfrey Kneller and Sir Joshua Reynolds (the last being a personal friend of the 3rd Duke), and a copy of the Raphael Cartoons. Reynolds's portraits in the house include a late self-portrait in doctoral robes and depictions of Samuel Johnson, Oliver Goldsmith and Wang-y-tong, a Chinese page boy who was taken into the Sackville household. There are also survivals from the English Renaissance: an Italianate staircase of great delicacy and the vividly carved overmantel and fireplace in the Great Chamber. The 'Sackville leopards', holding heraldic shields in their paws and forming finials on the balusters of the principal stair (constructed 1605–1608) of the house, are derived from the Sackville coat of arms. The chapel-room with its crypt seems to pre-date this period and has contemporary pews.

The organ, in the late medieval private chapel at Knole, is arguably the oldest playable organ in England. The organ has four ranks of oak pipes (Stopped Diapason 8, Principal 4, Twelfth 22/3 and Fifteenth 2) contained in a rectangular ornamented chest with the keyboard at the top. Its date of construction is not known, but an early guidebook refers to a marked date of 1623 (although no such date mark is still apparent) – a date in the 1620s has been suggested. The pitch of the organ is sharp (A460 Hz) and the foot-pumped bellows remain in working order.

=== Collections ===
The National Trust has a digital record of most of its Knole collection. It contains internationally important collections, particularly of 17th-century state furniture.

== Ownership, care and uses ==
The house is cared for and opened by the National Trust, which has owned the house since it was donated by Charles Sackville-West, 4th Baron Sackville in 1947; however, the Trust owns only the house and an adjoining modest park – overall 52 acres (21 ha). Much of the house is lived in by the Sackville-Wests: the Sackville family or the family trust own the remainder of the deer park but permit commercialised access and certain charitable and sporting community events.

There is an oft repeated myth that Knole is a calendar house, which had 365 rooms, 52 staircases, 12 entrances and seven courtyards. While the number of rooms is approximately correct, the number of staircases has been reduced by internal renovations and changes. Traditionally, there have been seven spaces called courts – Green Court, Stable Court, Stone Court, Water Court, Queen's Court, Pheasant Court and Men's Court. This definition is somewhat loose, with additional courtyards such as Brewhouse Yard and Carpenters Yard not included.

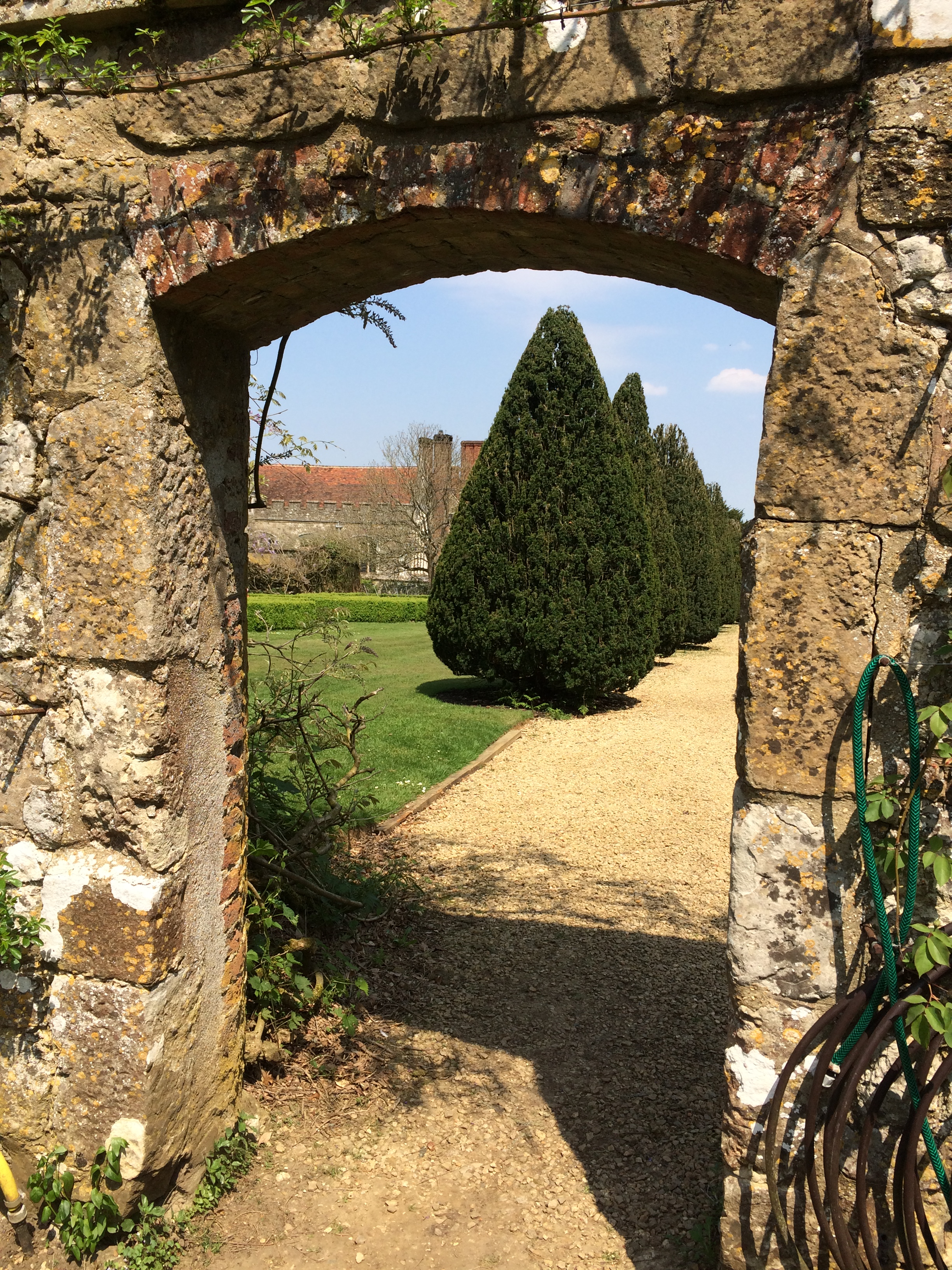
View into the inner walled garden

In January 2012, the National Trust launched a seven-year plan to conserve and restore the house, including a public appeal for £2.7M.

=== Gardens ===
Knole has a 26 acres (11 ha) walled garden (30 including the 'footprint' of the house). It has the unusual – and essentially medieval feature of a smaller walled garden inside the outer one (Hortus Conclusus). It contains many other features from earlier ages which have been taken out of most country-house gardens: various landscapers have been employed to elaborate the design of its large gardens with distinctive features. These features include clair-voies, a patte d'oie, two avenues, and bosquet hedges. The herb garden by the orangery was designed in 1963 by Margaret Brownlow.

=== Remainder of the park ===
Overall the house is set in its 1,000-acre (400 ha) deer park. This has generally been kept in traditional condition; however, the controlled deer population does not have access to all parts. Due to the rich woodland, Knole Park is a Site of Special Scientific Interest. The park hosts the annual Knole Run, a schools cross-country race.

=== Commercial and cultural uses ===
Knole was the setting for the filming in January 1967 of the Beatles' videos that accompanied the release of Penny Lane and Strawberry Fields Forever. The stone archway through which the four Beatles rode on horses can still be seen on the southeastern side of the Bird House, which itself is on the southeastern side of Knole House. The same visit to Knole Park inspired another Beatles song, Being for the Benefit of Mr. Kite!, which John Lennon wrote after buying an 1843 poster in a nearby antiques shop that advertised Pablo Fanque's Circus Royal.

Knole also appears in the 2008 film The Other Boleyn Girl, along with nearby Penshurst Place and Dover Castle. It has been featured in several other films including Burke and Hare (2010), Sherlock Holmes: A Game of Shadows and Pirates of the Caribbean: On Stranger Tides.

The British Film Institute has a freely-available, family home film from 1961, showing how the park looked at that time. A 1950 film made by the Sevenoaks Ciné Society, an amateur group, features the house in Hikers' Haunt. In May 2025 Knole was featured on the BBC's Hidden Treasures of the National Trust.

== See also ==
- John Frederick Sackville, 3rd Duke of Dorset
- Lionel Bertrand Sackville-West, 6th Baron Sackville

== Bibliography ==
=== Primary sources ===
- Centre for Kentish Studies, U269 T1 Bdl. A.
- Early English Books Online, Thomason / 14:E.83[19]. Two speeches spoken at the councell-table at Oxford. The one, by the Right Honourable John Earle of Bristoll, in favour of the continuation of the present warre. The other, by the Right Honourable Edward Earle of Dorset, for a speedy accommodation betwixt His Majestie, and his high court of Parliament. Printed at Oxford by Leonard Lichfield, And now reprinted at LONDON for Iohn Hanson (1642).
- House of Lords Journal for Monday 15 August 1642 (18 Car 289 vol 5; https://www.british-history.ac.uk/lords-jrnl/vol5/pp288-293#h3-0006).
- The National Archive: PRO, Exchequer, E 101/421/10.

=== Secondary sources ===
- Barrett Lennard, Thomas (1908), "An account of the families of Lennard and Barrett", private publication, https://archive.org/stream/accountoffamilie02barr.
- Benson-Wilson, Andrew (January 2002), catalogue notes in "Thomas Tallis: The Complete Works, Volume 5" at signumrecords.com: http://www.signumrecords.com/catalogue/choral/thomas-tallis:-the-complete-works-*-volume-5/sigcd016.html.
- Brady, Henry John, F.R.A.S. (1839), The Visitor's Guide to Knole, (James Payne, London, 1839)The Visitor's Guide to Knole.
- Burns, Robert E. (2008), Sackville, 'Lionel Cranfield, first duke of Dorset', Oxford Dictionary of National Biography (3.1.2008), accessed 23.2.2018. (subscription required)
- Champion, Matthew (2018), 'Fighting fire with fire: taper burn marks', in British Archaeology (March–April 2018), 36–41.
- Clark, Linda (2004),'Bourchier, Thomas', in Oxford Dictionary of National Biography, doi:10.1093/ref:odnb/2993 (23.9.2004), accessed 23.2.2018. (subscription required)
- Coward, Barry & Gaunt, Peter (2017), The Stuart Age, 5th edition, Routledge.
- Donnagan, Barbara (2008), 'Sir William Waller', Oxford Dictionary of National Biography, doi:10.1093/ref:odnb/28561 (3.1.2008), accessed 14.3.2018. (subscription required)
- Du Boulay, F.B.H. (1950). "A Note on the Rebuilding of Knole by Archbishop Bourgchier'". Archaeologia Cantiana. 63: 135–139.
- Du Boulay, F. B. H. (1952), 'Archbishop Cranmer and the Canterbury Temporalities', in English Historical Review vol. 67, no. 262 (Jan 1952), pages 19–36. doi:10.1093/ehr/LXVII.CCLXII.19
- Everitt, Alan M. (1960), 'An Account Book of the Committee of Kent, 1646–7' in A Seventeenth Century Miscellany, Kent Records, vol. XVII (1960).
- Everitt, Alan M. (1966), The Community of Kent and the Great Rebellion, 1640–1660, Leicester University Press.
- Everitt, Alan M. (1986), Continuity and Colonization: the evolution of Kentish settlement, Leicester University Press.
- Forde, Deidre (2010), Knole Cellars in Stone Court, Sevenoaks, Kent, Oxford Archaeology for the National Trust, https://library.thehumanjourney.net/645/.
- Graves, Michael (2014), 'Sackville, Robert, second earl of Dorset', Oxford Dictionary of National Biography, doi:10.1093/ref:odnb/24449 (25.9.2014), accessed 22.02.2018. (subscription required)
- Gregory, Alden (2010) Knole: an Architectural and Social History of the Archbishop of Canterbury's House, 1456–1538, unpublished University of Sussex D Phil Thesis, available at http://sro.sussex.ac.uk/id/eprint/6896/ 72–83.
- Harvey, I.M.W. (2004), 'Cade, John [Jack] [alias John Mortimer; called the Captain of Kent]', in Oxford Dictionary of National Biography, doi:10.1093/ref:odnb/4292 (23.9.2004), accessed 7.3.2018. (subscription required)
- Hasted, Edward (1797), The History and Topographical Survey of the County of Kent: Volume 3, Edward Hasted (1797). "Parishes: Sevenoke". The History and Topographical Survey of the County of Kent: Volume 3. Institute of Historical Research..
- Jackson-Stops, Gervase, Knole, the National Trust, 1984.
- Laing, Alastair, foreword to 'Knole' in National Trust (no editor acknowledged), Oil Paintings in National Trust Properties in National Trust V: South Public Catalogue Foundation/ National Trust, 2013; foreword, pp. 160–162, followed by illustrated catalogue, pp. 162–189.
- Love, Harold (2008), 'Sackville, Charles, sixth earl of Dorset and first earl of Middlesex', Oxford Dictionary of National Biography, doi:10.1093/ref:odnb/24442 (3.1.2008), accessed 23.2.2018. (subscription required)
- National Heritage List for England|num=1000183|access-date=17 August 2013.
- Newman, John (2012), Kent: West and the Weald, in the series The Buildings of England, Yale and London: Yale University Press.
- Newton, A.P. (1942), Introduction to Calendar of the Manuscripts of Major-General Lord Sackville, KBE, CB, CMG, Preserved at Knole, Sevenoaks, Kent, vol. 1, Cranfield Papers, 1551–1612, Historical Manuscripts Commission, 80; HMSO, London, 1942.
- Phillips, Charles J. (1918). "Arms and Armour seized at Knole House during the Civil War". Archaeologia Cantiana. 33: 125–130.
- Rymer's Foedera Volume 12. Originally published by Apud Joannem Neulme, London, 1739–1745. Online edition from https://www.british-history.ac.uk/search/series/rymer-foedera.
- Sackville-West, Robert (2010), 'Inheritance: The Story of Knole & the Sackvilles', Bloomsbury.
- Sackville-West, Vita (1922), Knole and the Sackvilles, Heinemann.
- Sackville-West, Vita 'Knole and its Owners', in Jackson-Stops, Gervase (1984) Knole, The National Trust.
- Smith, David L. (1989), The Political Career of Edward Sackville, Fourth Earl of Dorset, University of Cambridge unpublished PhD thesis, https://www.repository.cam.ac.uk/handle/1810/250968.
- Smith, David L. (2008), 'Sackville, Edward, fourth earl of Dorset', Oxford Dictionary of National Biography, doi:10.1093/ref:odnb/24444 (3.1.2008), accessed 22.2.2018. (subscription required)
- Spence, Richard T. (2004), 'Clifford, Anne [known as Lady Anne Clifford], countess of Pembroke, Dorset, and Montgomery', Oxford Dictionary of National Biography, doi:10.1093/ref:odnb/5641, 25.9.2014, accessed 14.3.2018. (subscription required)
- Taylor, Kristina (2003). "The development of the park and gardens at Knole". Archaeologia Cantiana. 123: 153–184.
- Town, Edward (2010), A House 'Re-edified': Thomas Sackville and the Transformation of Knole, 1605–1608, unpublished PhD Thesis, University of Sussex; available online via Sussex Research Online:http://sro.sussex.ac.uk/id/eprint/6893/.
- Turner, Steve (1994), "A Hard Day's Write." New York: HarperCollins.
- Whitworth, Michael (2015), Introduction and Notes to Orlando: a Biography, Oxford World Classics, added to the 2015 edition.
- Woolf, Virginia (1928), Orlando: a Biography, The Hogarth Press.
- Wormald, Jenny (2014)'James VI and I', Oxford Dictionary of National Biography, doi:10.1093/ref:odnb/14592, 25.9.2014, accessed 28.2.2018. (subscription required)
- Zim, Rivkah (2005) Sackville, Thomas, first Baron Buckhurst and first earl of Dorset, Oxford Dictionary of National Biography, doi:10.1093/ref:odnb/24450, (28.5.2015), accessed 22.02.2018. (subscription required)
