= County Hall, Maidstone =

County building in Maidstone, Kent, England

County Hall
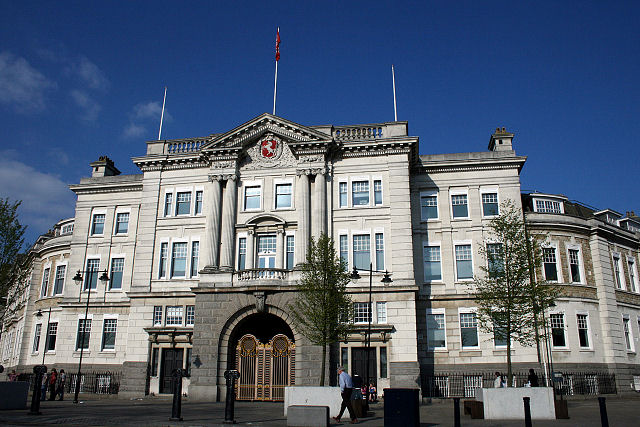
- The 1913 facade of County Hall
- Interactive map of County Hall
- 51.2785°N 0.5221°E
- Location: Maidstone, Kent, England

History
- Built: 1824

Site notes
- Architect: Sir Robert Smirke
- Architectural style: Greek Revival style

Listed Building – Grade II
- Designated: 26 July 1973
- Reference no.: 1086392

County Hall, formerly the Old Sessions House, is a municipal building in Sandling Road in Maidstone, Kent, England. The county hall, which is the headquarters of Kent County Council, is a Grade II listed building. It lies along the western wall of HM Prison Maidstone.

== History ==
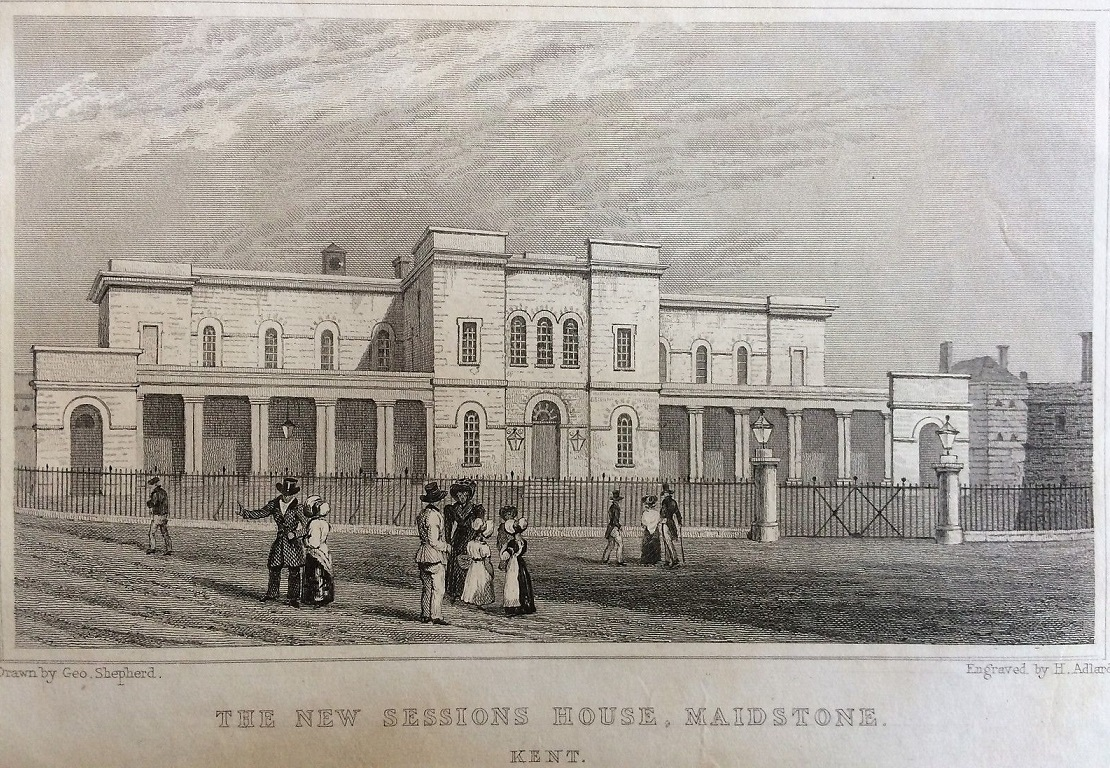
The Sessions House, designed by Sir Robert Smirke, which can still be seen through the stone archway of the 1913 facade

The original Sessions House, which was designed by Sir Robert Smirke in the Greek Revival style, was completed in 1824. The original design involved a symmetrical main frontage facing south west; the central section of three bays featured an arched doorway with a fanlight flanked by two narrow windows and there was a triple window on the first floor; the end bays of the central section slightly projected forwards. The building was initially used as a facility for dispensing justice but, following the implementation of the Local Government Act 1888, which established county councils in every county, it also became the offices and meeting place for Kent County Council. Internally, the principal room in the Sessions House was the council chamber.

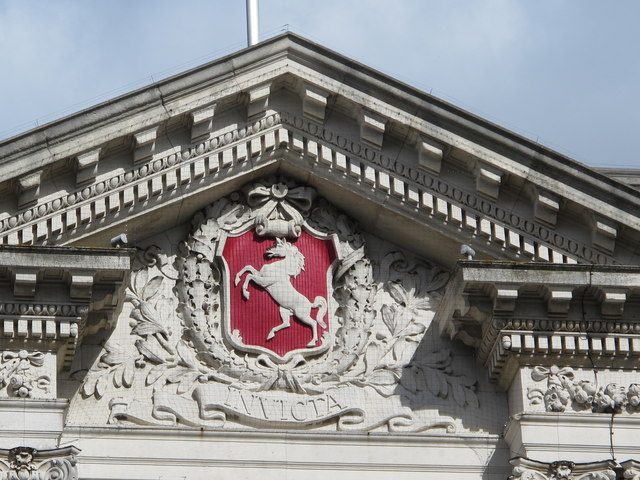
The coat of arms of Kent in the façade.

The construction of a façade, designed by the county architect, F. W. Ruck, in the neo-baroque style, was completed in November 1913. The design of the facade involved a symmetrical main frontage of nine bays facing south west; the central section of three bays featured a large stone archway with iron gates on the ground floor; there was a triple window on the first floor and two sash windows on the second floor with pairs of huge Ionic order columns flanking the windows on the second and third floors supporting a pediment above. A further extension was added in the 1930s.

Invicta House, a six-storey hexagonal building was built adjacent to County Hall in order to create extra accommodation capacity in the 1960s. County Hall continued to serve as the main venue for the assizes in the county of Kent for much of the 20th century. Following the implementation of the Courts Act 1971, the building served as a venue for crown court hearings until the new Law Courts in Barker Road were completed in 1983.

The Centre for Kentish Studies, established at County Hall in 1933, relocated to the new Kent History and Library Centre in James Whatman Way, which also incorporated the town's former Central Library, in April 2012.

In March 2020 the county council announced that it was considering leaving the building and moving to alternative premises which would be less costly to maintain.

Works of art in the county hall include a portrait of the Deputy Lieutenant of Kent, Lionel Sackville-West, 3rd Baron Sackville, by John St Helier Lander and a portrait of the Governor of Bombay, George Harris, 4th Baron Harris, by Hubert von Herkomer.
