= Maidstone Law Courts =

Judicial building in Maistone, England

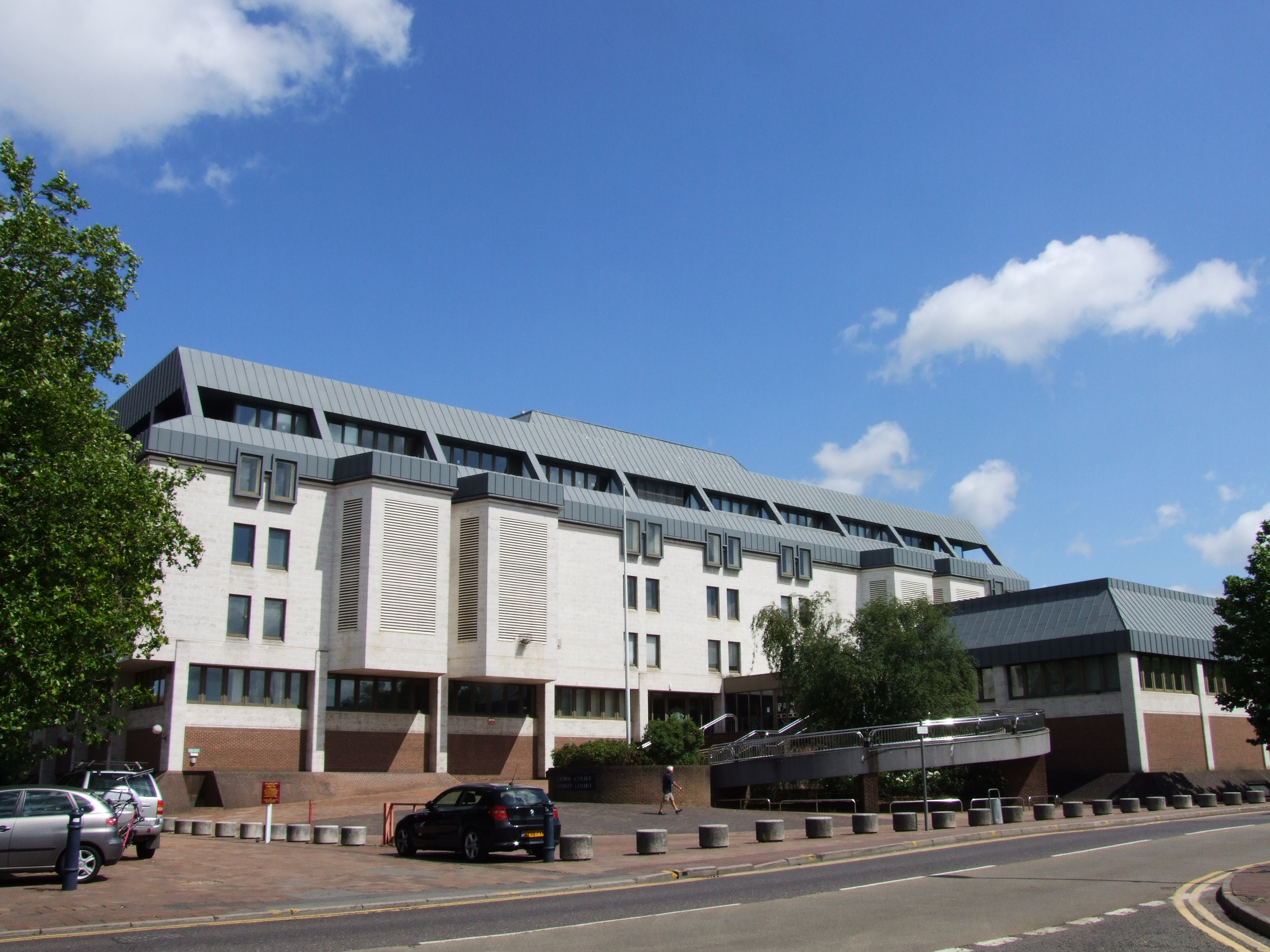
- Maidstone Law Courts

- Shown in Kent
- 51.2710°N 0.5187°E
- Location: Barker Road, Maidstone

History
- Built: 1983

Site notes
- Architect: Austin-Smith:Lord
- Architectural style: Modernist style

The Maidstone Law Courts is a Crown Court venue, which deals with criminal cases, as well as a County Court venue, which deals with civil cases, in Barker Road, Maidstone, England.

== History ==
Until the early 1980s, the main venue for criminal court hearings in Maidstone was the County Hall. However, as the number of court cases in the Maidstone area grew, it became necessary to commission a more modern courthouse for criminal matters: the site selected by the Lord Chancellor's Department, on the north east side of Barker Road, had been occupied by a timber yard with a river wharf.

The new building was designed by Austin-Smith:Lord in the Modernist style, built in concrete at a cost of £10.2 million, and was completed in 1983. It was officially opened by Queen Elizabeth II on 31 October 1984. The design involved an asymmetric five-storey main frontage of nine bays facing onto Barker Road with a lower entrance block projected forward from the main building. The ground floor was faced with red brick and fenestrated by a continuous row of casement windows. The upper storeys were supported by concrete columns which divided the bays: on these floors, the second, third, seventh and eighth bays featured blind walls which were cantilevered out of the pavement while the other bays were fenestrated by pairs of narrow casement windows. Internally, the building was laid out with ten courtrooms.

Notable cases include the trial and conviction of Jeremy Wing and Brian Hogg, in November 2002, for child sex offences, for which they received whole life orders. They also include the trial and conviction of Robert Howard, in October 2003, for the murder of Hannah Williams, the trial and conviction of Antoni Imiela, in March 2004, for seven counts of rape, and the trial and conviction of Peter Connolly, in December 2007, for the murder of Christopher Alaneme.
