= Centre for Kentish Studies =

Coordinates: 51.2785°N 0.5221°E

The Centre for Kentish Studies was a combined county record office and local studies library, based for many years at the County Hall, Maidstone, Kent, UK. The original archive repository, known as the Kent Archives Office, was first established by Kent County Council in 1933, placing it amongst the earliest local authority record offices in England. It merged with the county's local studies library in 1990 and the enlarged unit thereafter adopted the new name.

The centre was recognised by the Lord Chancellor for holding official public records. It had also been designated a diocesan record office, serving the two dioceses of Rochester and Canterbury (archdeaconry of Maidstone). Over the ensuing years it acquired further administrative links with the Canterbury Cathedral Library and with branch record offices in Dover, Folkestone, Ramsgate, Rochester and Sevenoaks.

The centre closed in November 2011 prior to relocation in a new purpose-built headquarters at James Whatman Way, Maidstone, opening in Spring 2012 and thereafter to operate under another new title – the Kent History and Library Centre (additionally accommodating the county's Central Library). The new arrangements also involved the closure and absorption of the former East Kent Archives Centre in Dover.

Besides holding the usual local authority archives and ecclesiastical parish registers, the numerous other major collections include political and estate papers of the Earls of Guildford, the Stanhope of Chevening papers, and papers of the Talbot and Stuart-Wortley families.
