= Kent History and Library Centre =

Library and county record office in Maidstone, England

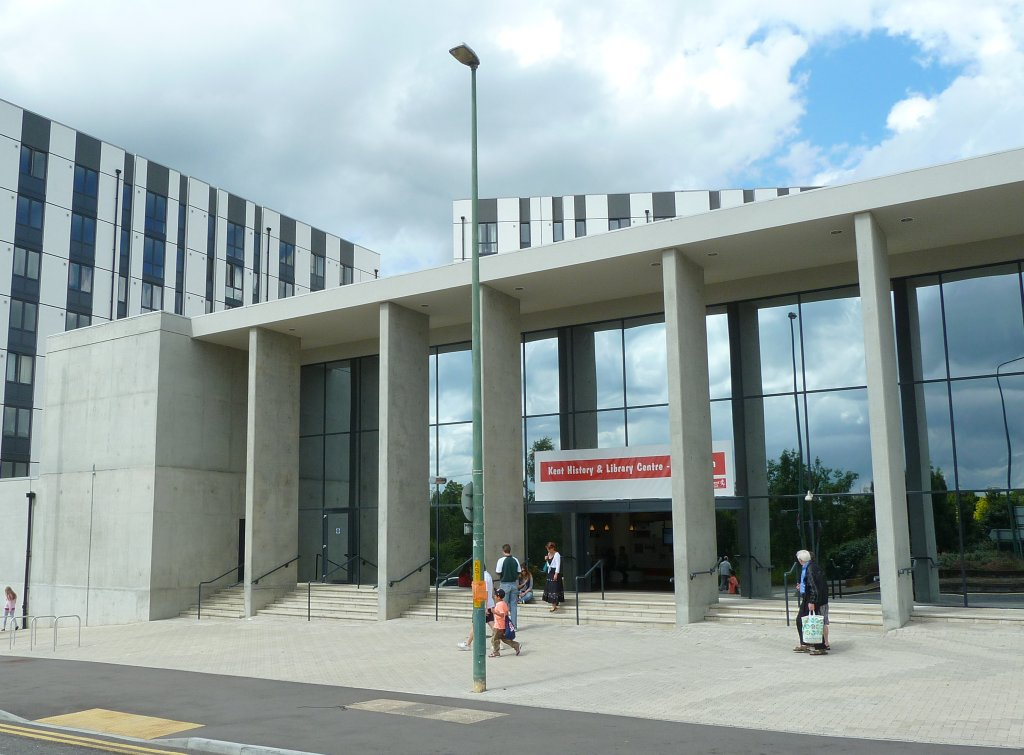
- 51°16′49″N 0°31′02″E
- Location: Maidstone, England

Other information
- Website: Official website

The Kent History and Library Centre is a purpose-built headquarters in James Whatman Way, Maidstone, that opened on 23 April 2012. It has been designed to incorporate under one roof the former Centre for Kentish Studies (the combined county record office and local studies library) and the town's former Central Library.

== Sculpture ==
In August 2013 a sculpture by Antony Gormley entitled "Two Stones" was installed adjacent to the building. The sculpture had originally been commissioned by Kent County Council in the 1970s from Gormley, then a newly graduated art student of the Maidstone College of Art, for a new development in Ashford but had been removed following vandalism.
