= The Radev Collection =

Private art collection

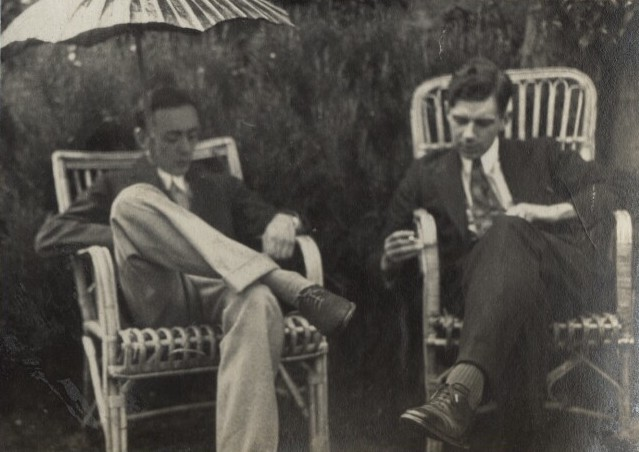
Edward Sackville-West, left, with Raymond Mortimer, at Garsington Manor, June 1923.

The Radev Collection is a private art collection comprising more than 800 works by Impressionist and Modernist artists including Georges Braque, Pablo Picasso, Amedeo Mogdigliani, Duncan Grant, Frances Hodgkins, Ben Nicholson, and Lucien Pissarro. It is named after the Bulgarian émigré Mattei Radev, a picture framer and art collector, who moved in the social circles of the Bloomsbury group. It originated with music critic Edward Sackville-West, 5th Baron Sackville, who began the collection in 1938. It was inherited by the artist and art dealer Eardley Knollys in 1965 and later by Radev in 1991.

== History ==
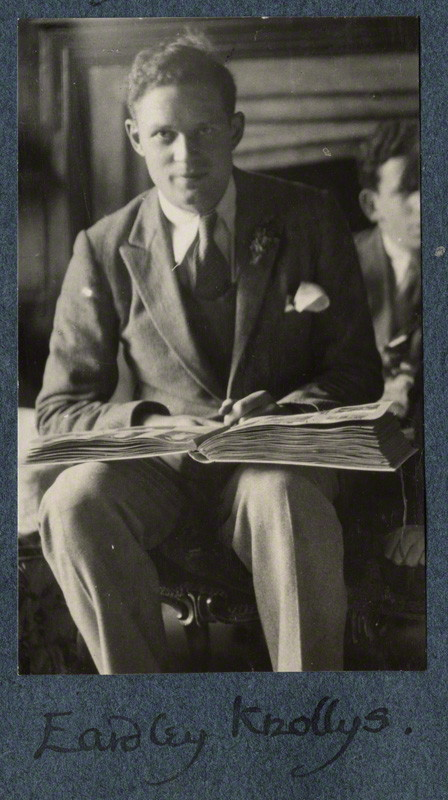
Eardley Knollys, 1924, by Lady Ottoline Morrell

Radev ran a picture framing business in London and was a lover of the writer E. M. Forster, with whom he began an affair in 1960. He arrived in Britain in 1950 after escaping communist Bulgaria by swimming across a river to Turkey, and then hiding in the lifeboat of a cargo ship travelling from Istanbul to Glasgow, where he was able to claim asylum. He later moved to London, where while working as an orderly at Whittington Hospital, he met the early gay activist and noted eye surgeon Patrick Trevor-Roper, who introduced him to the artistic circles of London.

Radev undertook a picture framing apprenticeship and later set up his own framing business and workshop in Fitzrovia, London in 1960, with a loan from Eardley Knollys, a friend who he had met in 1957. His business was successful and he later set up a second shop. His distinguished customers included Vanessa Bell, Duncan Grant, Graham Sutherland, John Banting and Princess Michael of Kent, who at that time was working as an interior designer. Radev ran the business until the early 1990s when he sold it. He kept ownership of his original framing workshop building, which he used as his private home and where he displayed his art collection, which was not open to the public.

Radev's friend Eardley Knollys ran the Storran Gallery in London with his partner Frank Coombs from 1936 and 1944. They sold works by artists such as Amedeo Modigliani, Maurice Utrillo and Chaïm Soutine. Coombs was killed in an air raid in Belfast in 1941, which led to Knollys closing the gallery in 1944.

Edward Sackville-West, who had briefly been Knollys' lover when they were students at Oxford University in the early 1920s, later became a lifelong friend. In 1945, Knollys, Sackville-West and the music critic Desmond Shawe-Taylor together bought a Georgian rectory at Long Crichel, Dorset, where they held weekend salons, attended by some of the most notable cultural figures of the period, including Benjamin Britten, Nancy Mitford, Graham Greene and Somerset Maugham. Radev often visited; it was there that he met E.M. Forster. Paintings from the collection were kept there. When Sackville-West died unexpectedly in 1965, aged 63, Knollys inherited the art works he had been collecting since 1938 and added them to his own art collection.

Knollys and Radev bought a former hunting lodge in Hampshire in 1967, which had an artist's studio where they both painted. They used the lodge as a country retreat until Knollys' death in 1991 and bought additional paintings for the collection. The collection was then inherited by Radev.

Radev died in 2009, survived by his civil partner. Selected works from the collection were made available online in 2011 and selected paintings were exhibited in London and other locations in England between 2011 and 2013. As at October 2020, The Radev Collection website is no longer live, although parts of it have been preserved by the Internet Archive.

The collection has made a return to public viewing at The Wilson Art Gallery, Cheltenham in the UK from 8 March through to 1 September 2024 along with exhibits covering the life of Radev and the history of the collection itself.

== The Collection ==
Although the collection largely consists of works collected by Sackville-West and Knollys, each of the three men added to what eventually became a collection that numbered in the hundreds, but was never fully catalogued. It reflects their different tastes: Sackville-West for Modernism, Knollys for French impressionists and Radev for the modern British artists with whom he worked and from whom he bought works directly.

It includes works by over 65 artists, such as Vanessa Bell, Georges Braque, Eugène Boudin, Henri Gaudier-Brzeska, Maurice Denis, Duncan Grant, Frances Hodgkins, Amedeo Modigliani, Ben Nicholson, Pablo Picasso, Lucien Pissarro, Matthew Smith, Graham Sutherland, and Alfred Wallis, many of whom were known personally by the three men who put the collection together. It includes works by Radev and Knollys, and portraits of each of them by Duncan Grant. It also has works by Knollys' late partner, Frank Coombs. One of the notable works is Two Male Nudes (1946) by Keith Vaughan, which was given to E.M. Forster by Christopher Isherwood. Forster later gave it to Radev, who he was in love with.

Radev only ever sold one painting from the collection he inherited, Portrait de Lagar, a Modigliani from 1915.
