= Against the Law =

Against the Law may refer to:

- Against the Law (1934 film), a 1934 American film
- Against the Law (1950 film), a 1950 Italian film
- Against the Law (1997 film), a 1997 American film
- Against the Law (album), a 1990 album by Stryper
- Against the Law (EP), an EP by Defiance
- Against the Law (2017 film), a 2017 British TV film
- Against the Law (TV series), an American TV series
- Against the Law (book), a memoir by British writer and gay rights campaigner Peter Wildeblood
