= Patrick Trevor-Roper =

British eye surgeon, author and pioneer gay rights activist

Patrick Dacre Trevor-Roper (7 June 1916 – 22 April 2004) was a British eye surgeon, author and pioneer gay rights activist, who played a leading role in the campaign to decriminalise homosexuality in the UK.

== Life and career ==
He was born in Northumberland, the son of a doctor, and the brother of historian Hugh Trevor-Roper. He was educated at Charterhouse, the University of Cambridge and the Westminster Medical School. During his education he bunked next to leading eye surgeon E F King in the hospital air raid shelter, and was inspired by him to pursue ophthalmology. During World War II, he served in the Royal New Zealand Army Medical Corps in the Mediterranean. After the war he became a specialist in ophthalmic surgery, and divided his working life between work in public hospitals and a lucrative private practice in London.

In 1945, Trevor-Roper's friends Edward Sackville-West, artist and art dealer Eardley Knollys and the music critic Desmond Shawe-Taylor jointly bought Long Crichel House, a Georgian rectory in Long Crichel, Dorset. Trevor-Roper lived there for a time and along with his friends established "one of the last great post-war salons, hosting guests including Sybil Colefax, Anthony Asquith, Graham Sutherland, Lord Berners, Nancy Mitford, Benjamin Britten, Laurie Lee, Ben Nicolson, Cecil Day-Lewis and Graham Greene."

In 1955, Trevor-Roper agreed to appear as a witness before the Wolfenden Committee which had been appointed by the British government to investigate, among other things, whether male homosexuality should remain a crime. He was one of only three men who could be found to appear as openly gay witnesses before the Committee. The others were the journalist Peter Wildeblood, who had been convicted of a homosexual offence, and Carl Winter, director of the Fitzwilliam Museum. Trevor-Roper and Winter came forward to counteract the bad impression they felt Wildeblood would make.

Trevor-Roper told the Wolfenden Committee that the majority of gay men led normal and well-adjusted lives, posed no threat to children or public morality, and that homosexuality was not a physical or mental illness. He pointed out that the existing laws did nothing but encourage blackmailers. He argued that the age of consent should be lowered to 16, and told the committee that many young gay men committed or attempted suicide because of isolation or depression induced by homophobia.

The other cause to which Trevor-Roper devoted himself was better access to ophthalmic medicine, both in the United Kingdom and in African countries. He campaigned successfully for the repeal of British laws which prevented the sale of cheap spectacles, against the resistance of the opticians' lobby. In 1983, he helped finance Peter Risdon in his successful challenge to the opticians' monopoly in the UK, a challenge that led directly to the legalisation of the sale of reading glasses without prescription.

In his 1970 book The World Through Blunted Sight, he explored how faulty or failing eyesight affected the style and technique of writers and artists. Looking at the effects of myopia, cataracts, colour blindness, squints and total blindness he speculated on what the impact would have been on artists had they worn glasses.

Trevor-Roper was diagnosed with Alzheimer's disease in 2003 and with cancer in 2004, and died in April of that year. He was survived by Herman Chan, his partner of many years.

== Legacy ==
The Patrick Trevor Roper Award is an award for undergraduate medical students from the UK and the Republic of Ireland in Ophthalmology.

== Works ==
- Trevor-Roper, Patrick (1970) The World Through Blunted Sight: An inquiry into the influence of defective vision on art and character. London: Thames & Hudson ISBN 978-0500490044
- Trevor-Roper, Patrick (1980) Lecture Notes in Ophthalmology. London: Blackwell Science ISBN 978-0632006427
