= Grandma Moses Goes to the Big City =

1946 painting by Grandma Moses

- Artist: Grandma Moses
- Year: 1946
- Medium: Oil paint, canvas
- Dimensions: 36 in (91 cm) × 48 in (120 cm)
- Location: Smithsonian American Art Museum
- Owner: Jane Kallir
- Accession no.: 2016.51

Grandma Moses Goes to the Big City is a 1946 oil painting by the American outsider painter Grandma Moses, produced at age 86 and signed "Moses". It has been in the collection of the Smithsonian American Art Museum since 2016.

It shows the artist's impression of her home in Eagle Bridge, New York, with herself as the central figure with family and friends while an automobile awaits. The other figures are working various tasks around the farm, emphasizing that she is leaving a going concern. It was painted after her works began to be shown all over the country. After she had refused to attend her first show in 1940 she began to attend a few of the events within a day's trip from her home. She had made a trip to Madison Square Garden in New York City the previous year to see her works on show at the Women's International Exposition in November 1945.

The painting is one of very few large 36 x 48 inch works on canvas, which came about because her friend Ala Story sent her larger prepared canvases and boards that she could not hold in her characteristic way, but painted them spread on her bed.

This painting was one of forty selected for her to tell her story in her own words in the book Grandma Moses American Primitive: "This was a request for Grandma Moses to go to the Big City, New York. Grandma, who had never traveled much, what anticipation, and vexation, what commotion and confusion, at last she is on her way."

== See also ==
- Galerie St. Etienne
