= Catherine Bennett (journalist) =

British journalist

- Born: Catherine Dorothea Bennett
- Occupation: Journalist
- Spouse: Robert Sackville-West (1985–1992)

Catherine Dorothea Bennett is a British journalist.

== Early life and education ==
The elder daughter of Geoffrey Bennett, of Smelthouses, North Yorkshire, Bennett was educated at Lawnswood High School, Leeds, and Hertford College, Oxford.

== Career ==
Bennett began her career in journalism at Honey magazine. Subsequently, she worked at The Sunday Telegraph, The Mail on Sunday, The Sunday Times, The Times and the short-lived Sunday Correspondent newspaper before joining The Guardian around 1990. She joined The Observer at the beginning of 2008, and was on the Orwell Prize's Journalism shortlist for 2009. In opinion pieces for the Observer, she has criticised the House of Lords.

In February 2023, a weekly column from Bennett in The Observer led to fellow Observer columnist James Wong resigning his own column and writing to the editorial department and tweeting to describe the column by Bennett as "completely unacceptable". Bennett's column sought to defend female MPs accused of transphobia in the context of the Gender Recognition Reform (Scotland) Bill and mentioned Rosie Duffield, Joanna Cherry and Miriam Cates by name, criticising comments by Lloyd Russell-Moyle and Ben Bradshaw.

== Personal life ==
From 1985 to 1992, Bennett was married to Robert Sackville-West, who inherited the title of Baron Sackville on the death of his uncle in 2004. She subsequently had a relationship with the books editor of the Evening Standard, David Sexton, ending before September 2005. She later had a relationship with the broadcaster John Humphrys, beginning in 2009.
