= Grandma Moses American Primitive =

1946 art catalog by Grandma Moses and Otto Kallir

Grandma Moses American Primitive was the first popular catalog of works by Grandma Moses by Otto Kallir, published in 1946.

Moses’ first solo exhibition had taken place in 1940 "What a Farmwife Painted", at the Galerie St. Etienne in New York. It was organized by Louis J. Caldor and Otto Kallir and since that time Kallir himself had become a firm admirer and promoter of the artist's work. He believed the choice of works in the 1940 exhibition "included many of her early attempts in which her great talent was scarcely recognizable."

Kallir decided to make a catalog based on Grandma Moses' own words on the occasion of her 85th birthday in 1945. He chose to add "American Primitive" to the title and gave the work the subtitle "Forty paintings with comments by Grandma Moses - together with her life's history". He then wrote an essay that partially rejected the "primitive" label that he felt responsible for, writing "It is important, however, not to confuse “primitive” with “self-taught” artists."

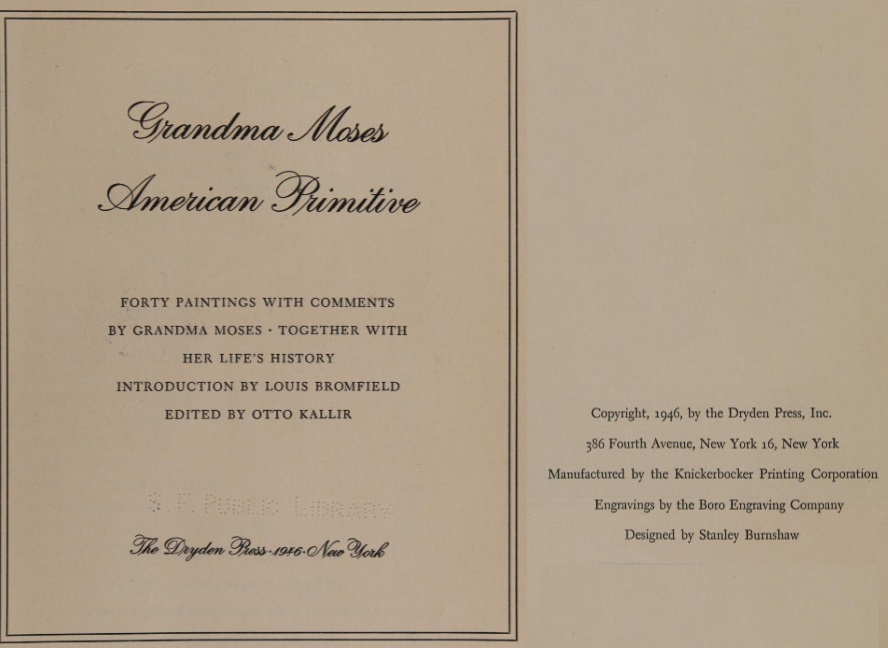
First version published by Dryden Press (now Harcourt), 1946

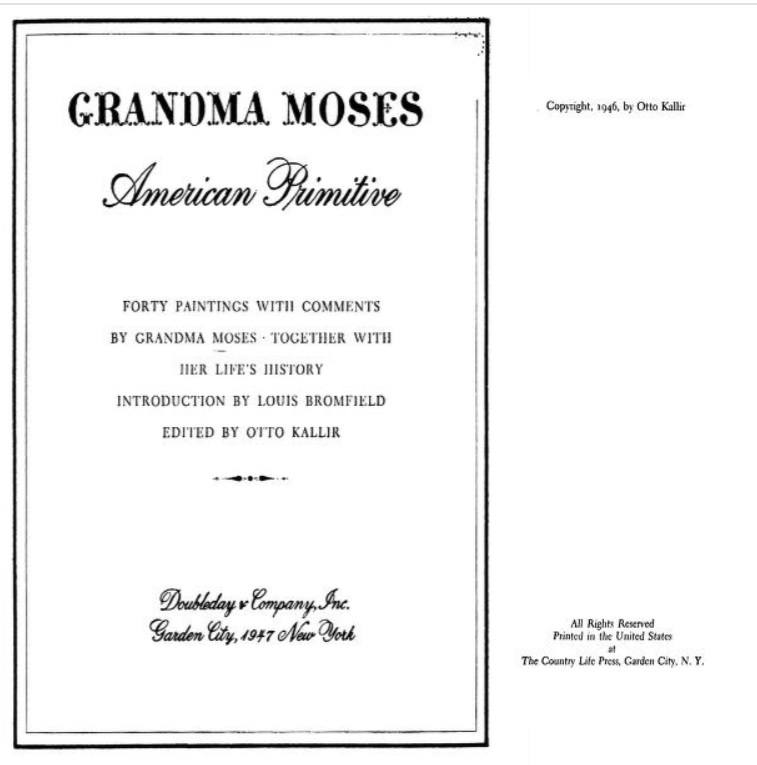
Second version by Doubleday, 1947

Louis Bromfield wrote the introduction, and Hildegard Bachert transcribed interviews with the artist to develop an ego-document that could be illustrated with a selection of paintings that reflected events and scenes from her life. The selection of paintings each accompanied a story from the artist's childhood in her own words. Two of the forty paintings were illustrated in color (Sugaring Off, and Old Oaken Bucket). Though the text and formatting were the same, the second edition switched the order of the paintings that accompanied the artist's stories in order to accompany two more color illustrations (The Old Checkered House in 1860, and Early Springtime on the Farm). These were the first published color illustrations of Grandma Moses paintings and they proved so popular that Kallir first registered her paintings with the Copyright Office in Washington and then arranged for large, higher quality prints that were published in 1948 to accommodate demand.

The list of 42 paintings follows which were included in both the 1946 and 1947 editions. These paintings were referenced with the acronym "GMAP", in Kallir's 1973 catalogue raisonné. Since the plate numbers were different but the topic selections were the same, this list is ordered by painting date. Only four paintings were included from the 1940 exhibition. The 1973 catalogue raisonné numbers and Grandma Moses record book numbers are also included along with known owner information:

title	1940 exhibition nr.	GMAP 1946 plate nr.	GMAP 1947 plate nr.	1973 Kallir cat. nr.	"RB" nr.	latest date painted	collection / owner
Shenandoah Valley, South Branch	20	4	8	51		1938	Louis J. Caldor
Bringing in the Maple Sugar	19	3	7	42		1939	Otto Kallir
Sugaring Off in Maple Orchard		6	10	56		1940	Sidney Janis
Cambridge in the Valley	25	5	9	11		1940	Louis J. Caldor
On the Road to Greenwich	27A	8	12	26		1940	Louis J. Caldor
Home of Hezekiah King, 1776		10	14	187	302	1942	
Black Horses		9	13	181		1942	Otto Kallir
Over the Bridge to Grandma's House		13	17	130		1942	
A Fire in the Woods		7	11	297	462	1943	Ala Story
The Trappers II		11	15	221	336	1943	Frank Jay Gould
Missouri		12	16	224	340	1943	Galerie St. Etienne
Checkered House		17		317		1943	IBM
McDonnell Farm		18	21	313	518	1943	The Phillips Collection
The Old Checkered House in 1860			3	387	592	1943	Ala Story
Over the River to Grandma's House		14	18	277	443	1943	Jack Kapp
Mt. Nebo in Winter		16	20	275	441	1943	Bennington Museum
Sugaring Off		1	1	276	442	1943	Galerie St. Etienne
Catching the Thanksgiving Turkey		15	19	260	353	1943	
The Old Oaken Bucket		2	2	238	343	1943	
Home for Thanksgiving		26	28	441	1036	1944	
Old Red Mill		21	24	480		1944	Jane Elizabeth Gosden
Hoosick Falls in Winter		23	26	425	810	1944	The Phillips Collection
The Old Automobile		24	27	442	1036	1944	
In the Park		19	22	343	600	1944	Galerie St. Etienne
In the Springtime		20	23	331	528	1944	Susan Vanderpoel Hun
Out for the Christmas Trees		25		444	1038	1944	
In Harvest Time		22	25	379	583	1944	
The Lookout, 1777, Vermont		31	32	508	1032	1945	
Our Barn		39	39	541	1061	1945	
Haying Time		28	29	485	1011	1945	
May: Making Soap, Washing Sheep		32	33	509	1033	1945	Miss Porter's School
A Winter's Day, 1870		33	34	511	1035	1945	Jane Winton
Bondsville Fair		34	35	497	1023	1945	
Going to Church		35	36	502	1027	1945	
Wash Day		36	37	498	1024	1945	Rhode Island School of Design Museum
Whiteside Church		38	38	543	1063	1945	Smithsonian American Art Museum
Picnic		30	31	484	1010	1945	
Early Springtime on the Farm		37	6	500	1026	1945	
The Lonely Tramp or Traveler		40	40	483	1003	1945	
The First Skating		29	30	486	1013	1945	
Here Comes Aunt Judith			4	581	1098	1946	
Grandma Moses Goes to the Big City		27	5	577	1091	1946	Smithsonian American Art Museum
