= Against the Law (book) =

Book by Peter Wildeblood

- First edition cover
- Author: Peter Wildeblood
- Language: English
- Publisher: Weidenfeld & Nicolson
- Publication date: 1955
- Publication place: United Kingdom
- Media type: Print
- ISBN: 9781474612524
- Followed by: A Way of Life

Against the Law is a 1955 book by Peter Wildeblood. It is an account of the "Montagu case" — the trial of Wildeblood, Michael Pitt-Rivers and Edward Montagu, Lord Montagu of Beaulieu, for homosexual offences — and Wildeblood's subsequent prison sentence.

Wildeblood was one of the first men in the UK to publicly declare his homosexuality. In the book, he declared his support for reform of law regarding homosexuality, and also for prison reform.

== Summary ==
Wildeblood declares, "I am a homosexual." He states he has always been so, and that it is unlikely homosexuality can be cured. He finds nothing "intrinsically shameful or sinful" about it.

After starting his studies at Oxford, Wildeblood joins the Royal Air Force. He makes friends of different social classes. He travels to Southern Rhodesia for flying training, but after several crashes he becomes an RAF meteorologist. Returning to Oxford after the war, he meets gay friends, and becomes accustomed to thinking of himself as a homosexual. He becomes a writer and playwright, putting on a successful farce about the groundnut scheme; then becomes a Fleet Street journalist for the Daily Mail: "I was forced to be deceitful, living one life during my working hours and another when I was free."

Wildeblood describes the "homosexual world, invisible to almost all who do not live in it", of private clubs and public houses. He meets Edward Montagu, Lord Montagu, and begins a relationship with Eddie McNally, an RAF corporal. They stay at Montagu's beach hut, with John Reynolds, another RAF serviceman, and Michael Pitt-Rivers.

Wildeblood quotes from a 25 October 1953 article in the Sydney Morning Telegraph about a "Scotland Yard plan to smash homosexuality in London", which "originated under strong United States advice to Britain to weed out homosexuals – as hopeless security risks – from important government jobs." This echoed the persecution of homosexuals in the United States, where hundreds of men were sacked from the State Department.

In an earlier trial of Montagu, the police were shown to have tampered with the evidence of his passport, in order to discredit him. On 9 January 1954, Wildeblood was arrested at his home, and his house searched without a warrant. He was induced to write a statement, while being denied access to a solicitor. The statement was later ruled involuntary and inadmissible as evidence. Wildeblood engaged a solicitor who would be willing to attack the police's evidence, something which was considered "not done" at the time.

Wildeblood's letters to McNally were produced as evidence, and McNally and Reynolds became witnesses for the Crown, in exchange for immunity from prosecution.

Wildeblood wrote,

I was determined to admit that I was a homosexual. This was not bravado; it was deliberate planning for the future. There were several signs that a full-scale inquiry into the problems of homosexuality would one day take place, and I meant to play a part in it. This I could not have done if I had taken the obvious line of defence and denied everything.

Wildeblood writes of support by his parents; a taxi-driver who took him to the magistrates' court; and the public, who applauded Lord Montagu and booed McNally and Reynolds; and later the kindness and tolerance of his neighbours. He quotes a Sunday Times editorial, which states the law "is not in accord with a large mass of private opinion."

Wildeblood is sent to prison, first to Winchester, where he is misunderstood by the Governor and Medical Officer; then to Wormwood Scrubs. He refuses to go abroad after his sentence. He forms a close relationship with Dan Starling, a gipsy burglar.

Wildeblood writes of the poor conditions in prison, with blocked toilets, unheated cells, and lack of genuine access to education. After his sentence, Wildeblood attends a debate at the House of Lords, where various suggestions for reforms are ignored by the government spokesman.

Wildeblood is granted permission to give evidence to the Committee of Homosexual Offences.

== Reception ==
The book was first published by Weidenfeld & Nicolson. It was republished in paperback by Penguin in 1957. Wildeblood wanted the book widely and cheaply available. Sir Allen Lane, founder of Penguin, sent a copy to every Member of Parliament.

The book was praised by Ian Gilmour in The Spectator, and by D. J. West in the International Journal of Psychiatry. However, James P. Whyte Jr., writing in the American Bar Association Journal, wrote that Wildeblood "fails to recognize the role of the family in civilized society and the necessity for laws which, while they may not directly protect the family, recognize it as the best foundation for an ordered society. Nor does he show an appreciation of the restraints placed on heterogeneous sexual conduct."

== Adaptations ==
The book inspired A Very British Sex Scandal, a 2007 Channel 4 docudrama; and Against the Law, a 2017 BBC docudrama.
