= Black Horses (Grandma Moses) =

1942 painting by Grandma Moses

- Lower Cambridge Valley
- Artist: Grandma Moses
- Year: 1942
- Medium: Oil paint, composition board
- Dimensions: 20 in (51 cm) × 24 in (61 cm)
- Owner: Otto Kallir

Black Horses, or Lower Cambridge Valley is a 1942 oil painting by the American outsider painter Grandma Moses, produced at age 82 and signed "Moses". It was in the collection of Otto Kallir in 1975.

The painting shows the artist's impression of three horses, with the brown one on the left being ridden by two children coming up the hillside, and two black ones on the right that are cantering towards each other. The hillside overlooks Cambridge Valley with the Hoosic River in the middle and the mountain range beyond.

A recurring subject by the artist, this version made an impression on the gallerist Otto Kallir when he first saw it at Ala Story's show of Grandma Moses paintings at her American-British Art Center in December 1942. He considered it an important improvement upon the two circa 1940 versions he had shown at his gallery in What a Farm Wife Painted. This painting convinced him the artist had grown in two years and prompted him to undertake a copyright agreement with Grandma Moses at his Galerie St. Etienne. He included all three versions in his 1946 Grandma Moses American Primitive catalogue. Another 1942 version painted in the summer before Black Horses is held in the Smithsonian American Art Museum.
