= Carl Winter (art historian) =

British art historian and museum curator (1906–1966)

- Born: January 10, 1906; Melbourne, Victoria, Australia
- Died: 21 May 1966 (aged 60); Cambridge, England, United Kingdom
- Education: Xavier College, Newman College, Exeter College, Oxford
- Occupation: museum curator
- Employer(s): Victoria & Albert Museum; Fitzwilliam Museum
- Spouse: Theadora Barlow (m. 1936; div. 1953)
- Children: 2 sons and 1 daughter

Carl Winter (10 January 1906 – 21 May 1966) was a British art historian and museum curator. He worked at the Victoria & Albert Museum's collection of English watercolours and miniature portraits before moving to the Fitzwilliam Museum in Cambridge in 1946 following the end of the Second World War.

== Background ==
Winter was born in Melbourne, Australia, the son of Carl Winter and his wife Ethel (née Hardy). He was educated at Xavier College and Newman College, University of Melbourne. He moved to England in 1928 and attended Exeter College, Oxford.

== Career ==
Winter was appointed as an assistant keeper in the Departments of Engraving, Illustration and Design, and of Paintings, at the Victoria & Albert Museum in 1931, where he worked with Basil Long, leading the department after Long's death in 1936. He was appointed as deputy keeper there in 1945, but moved to become director and Morley Curator at the Fitzwilliam Museum in Cambridge in 1946, and also a fellow of Trinity College, Cambridge, where he remained until his death in 1966. He published Elizabethan Miniatures in 1943 and The British School of Miniature Portrait Painters in 1948.

Along with Patrick Trevor-Roper and Peter Wildeblood, Winter gave evidence to the Wolfenden Committee, whose report led in 1967 to the decriminalization of sex between adult male homosexuals. He gave evidence anonymously as "Mr White". His testimony to the committee has been portrayed on-screen in the BBC dramatisation, Consenting Adults.

== Personal life and death ==
Winter married Theodora (née Barlow) in 1936 and divorced in 1953. They had two sons and a daughter. He died aged 60 on 21 May 1966.
