= Edward Sackville-West, 5th Baron Sackville =

British music critic and novelist (1901–1965)

The Lord Sackville
- Baron Sackville
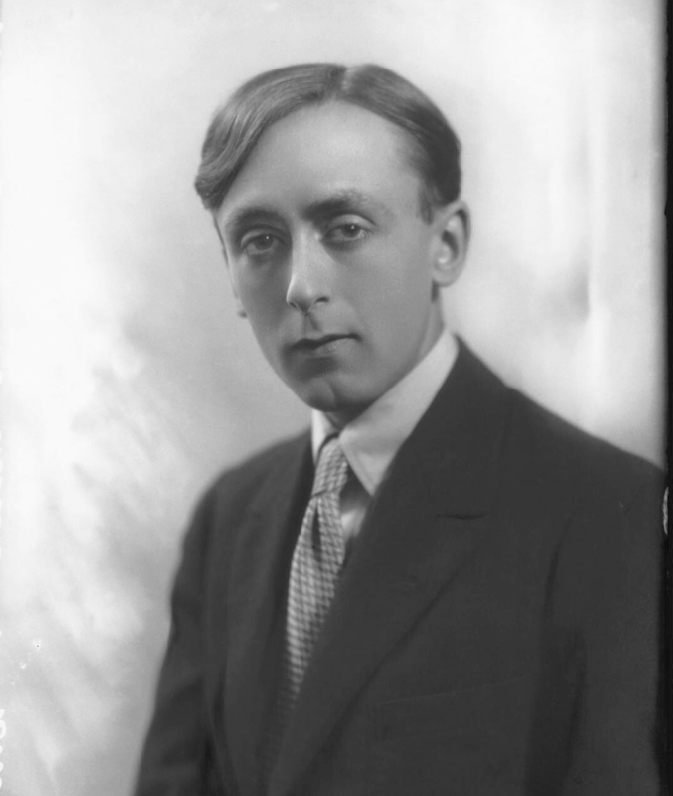
- Tenure: 8 May 1962 – 4 July 1965
- Successor: Lionel Sackville-West, 6th Baron
- Born: Edward Charles Sackville-West; 13 November 1901; Cadogan Gardens, London, England
- Died: 4 July 1965 (aged 63); Cooleville House, Clogheen, Ireland
- Parents: Charles Sackville-West, 4th Baron Sackville; Maud Cecilia Bell

Edward Charles Sackville-West, 5th Baron Sackville (13 November 1901 – 4 July 1965) was a British music critic, novelist and, in his last years, a member of the House of Lords. Musically gifted as a boy, he was attracted as a young man to a literary life and wrote a series of semi-autobiographical novels in the 1920s and 1930s. They made little impact, and his more lasting books are a biography of the essayist Thomas De Quincey and The Record Guide, Britain's first comprehensive guide to classical music on record, first published in 1951.

As a critic and a member of the board of the Royal Opera House, he strove to promote the works of young British composers, including Benjamin Britten and Michael Tippett. Britten worked with him on a musical drama for radio and dedicated to him one of his best known works, the Serenade for Tenor, Horn and Strings.

== Biography ==
=== Early years ===
Sackville-West was born at Cadogan Gardens, London, the elder child and only son of Major-General Charles John Sackville-West, who later became the fourth Baron Sackville, and his first wife, Maud Cecilia, née Bell (1873–1920); one of his cousins was the writer Vita Sackville-West, daughter of Lionel Sackville-West, 3rd Baron Sackville. He was educated at Eton and Christ Church, Oxford. While at Eton he studied the piano with Irene Scharrer, his housemaster's wife, and became highly proficient, winning the Eton music prize in 1918. His partner Desmond Shawe-Taylor said of him, "not many boys can have played at a school concert the Second Concerto of Rachmaninov. He even contemplated a pianist's career, but was deterred by poor health." At Oxford he made many literary friends, including Maurice Bowra, Roy Harrod and L. P. Hartley, and literature began to rival music as his chief interest. He left Oxford without taking his degree and embarked on a career as a novelist, writing a series of autobiographical novels.

=== Novelist ===
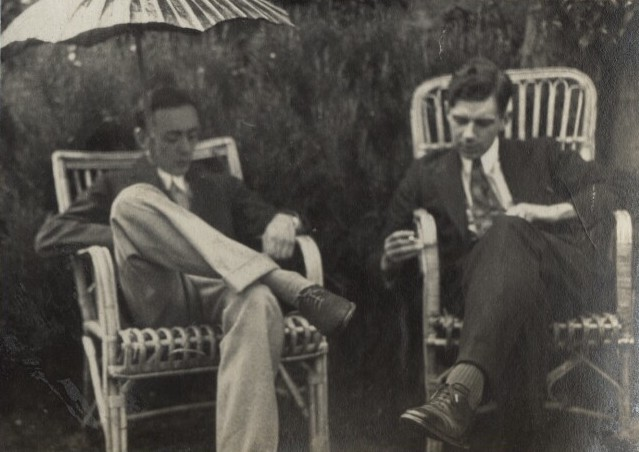
Edward Sackville-West (left), with the critic Raymond Mortimer at Garsington Manor, June 1923

His first novel, The Ruin: A Gothic Novel, was plainly autobiographical, and its depiction of turbulent, unconventional and ultimately calamitous relationships included characters readily identifiable from Sackville-West's circle. Its publication was therefore delayed, and his second novel, Piano Quintet, was published first. Sackville-West's biographer, Michael de-la-Noy, wrote, "The Ruin, like all the gothic literary efforts over which Sackville-West took infinite but rather pointless pains, was heavily laced with the mannered style of the late nineteenth-century 'decadent' movement … with whose work Eddy had unfortunately become enamoured when he was seventeen."

He published a further three novels, Mandrake over the Water-Carrier (1928), Simpson: A Life (1931) and The Sun in Capricorn (1934). They were reviewed politely but made little stir. Reviewing the third novel, The Times said, "The book is extremely cleverly and amusingly written, but to an ordinary intelligence it seems to be entirely inconsequent." Simpson: A Life was the best received. Its study of a children's nurse was judged "impressive and in its way original, the more so because Simpson has such a cool, aloof quality and so little resembles the conventional Nanny of fact or fiction." In this period, away from fiction, Sackville-West wrote A Flame in Sunlight: the Life and Work of Thomas De Quincey (1936), for which he won the James Tait Black Memorial Prize.

=== Musical work ===
In 1935 Sackville-West became music critic of the magazine New Statesman, a post he held for twenty years, contributing weekly reviews of recordings. The Times wrote that his articles "were distinguished not only for their command of the jewelled phrase but for their zealous propagation of young British composers." He was an early admirer of and campaigner for the music of Benjamin Britten. During World War II, Sackville-West joined the BBC as "an arranger and director of programmes". In 1943, he wrote The Rescue: a Melodrama for Broadcasting, for which Britten composed the music. It was first broadcast that year and was revived several times. The BBC producer Val Gielgud rated it as "a genuine broadcasting classic". The theme of The Rescue was the end of The Odyssey. Maurice Bowra dubbed it "The Eddyssey". In the same year, Britten dedicated his Serenade for Tenor, Horn and Strings to Sackville-West.

In addition to his column in The New Statesman, Sackville-West contributed a substantial quarterly article to The Gramophone, and, with Shawe-Taylor, wrote The Record Guide, first published in 1951, a large volume reviewing all significant classical music recordings then available. They soon found the flow of new releases overwhelming and enlisted the aid of two younger critics, Andrew Porter and William Mann. A revised and updated edition of The Record Guide published in 1955 ran to 957 pages, and Sackville-West, Shawe-Taylor and their colleagues did not publish any more editions.

From 1950 to 1955, Sackville-West was a member of the board of the Royal Opera House, Covent Garden, where he continued to work for the cause of modern British music, including that of Michael Tippett, whose opera The Midsummer Marriage was premiered in 1955.

=== Personal life ===
Long Crichel House, Dorset, built 1786

Sackville-West's family home was Knole in Kent. He maintained rooms there which are now open to the public, but it was not until 1945 that he had a home of his own, having lived with the art historian Kenneth Clark and his family at Upton near Tetbury. Together with Shawe-Taylor and the art dealer Eardley Knollys he bought Long Crichel House, an old rectory near Wimborne. Along with the literary critic Raymond Mortimer, he established "what in effect was a male salon, entertaining at the weekends a galaxy of friends from the worlds of books and music." Guests included E.M. Forster, Benjamin Britten, Nancy Mitford, Graham Greene, Vanessa Bell, Duncan Grant and Ben Nicholson. It is regarded as "one of the last great post-war salons". In 1956 he also bought Cooleville House at Clogheen in County Tipperary, Ireland. On the death of his father on 8 May 1962 he inherited the title Baron Sackville. He took his seat in the House of Lords but never made a speech.

He died suddenly in 1965 at Cooleville, aged 63. Shawe-Taylor wrote, "Barely a quarter of an hour before, he had been playing to a friend, who was staying with him, the new record of Britten's Songs from the Chinese performed by Peter Pears and Julian Bream. When I arrived for the funeral a few days later, the record was still out of its cover—something the meticulous Eddy would never have allowed." He was succeeded in the barony by his cousin Lionel Bertrand Sackville-West.

== Legacy ==
On his death in 1965, Sackville-West bequeathed a large collection of paintings to his friend and former lover Eardley Knollys, who added to it and in turn on his own death in 1991, left the collection to the Bulgarian emigre and picture framer Mattei Radev, a former lover of E.M. Forster. The collection, now known as The Radev Collection, consists of more than 800 works of Impressionist and Modernist art.

== Notes ==
Peerage of the United Kingdom
| Preceded by Charles Sackville-West | Baron Sackville; 1962–1965 | Succeeded by Lionel Sackville-West |
