= Moor Crichel =

Village in Dorset, England

Coordinates: 50.877°N 2.011°W

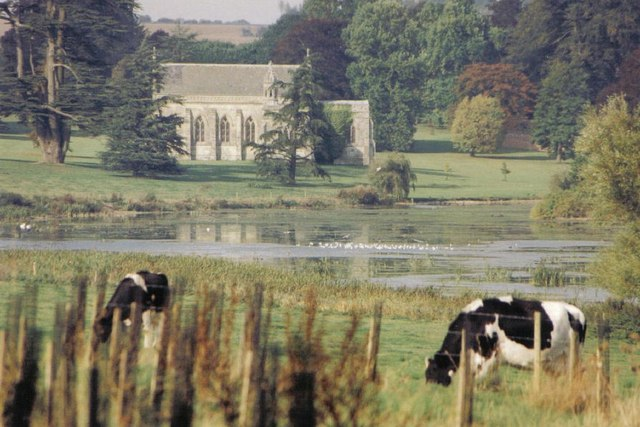
- Parish church of St Mary

- Location within Dorset
- Population: 140 (2013 estimate)
- OS grid reference: ST993086
- Civil parish: Crichel
- Unitary authority: Dorset
- Ceremonial county: Dorset
- Region: South West
- Country: England
- Sovereign state: United Kingdom
- Post town: WIMBORNE
- Postcode district: BH21
- Dialling code: 01258
- Police: Dorset
- Fire: Dorset and Wiltshire
- Ambulance: South Western
- UK Parliament: North Dorset

Moor Crichel (/ˈkrɪtʃəl/) is a village and former civil parish, now in the parish of Crichel, in Dorset, England situated on Cranborne Chase five miles east of Blandford Forum. The civil parish includes the hamlet of Manswood notable for a terrace of twelve thatched cottages. Dorset County Council's 2013 estimate of the parish population is 140. In the 2001 census the parish had a population of 180. In the 2011 census the population of Moor Crichel parish combined with the neighbouring parish of Long Crichel was 246 (figures have not been released for Moor Crichel separately). The civil parish was abolished on 1 April 2015 and merged with Long Crichel to form Crichel.

== Etymology ==
The name of Moor Crichel is first attested in the Domesday Book of 1086 as Circel, with forms such as Crechel attested from 1204 onwards. This name comes from the Common Brittonic word *crüg ("mound, hill, barrow"), compounded with the Old English word hyll, meaning the same thing: this Old English element was added to the name after Old English became the dominant language in the area and the Brittonic name of the settlement was no longer understood. The addition of moor, to distinguish the settlement from Long Crichel, is first attested in 1212, in the form Mor Kerchel(l); this refers to the marshy ground beside the River Allen where Moor Crichel stands.

Near to Moor Crichel is Chetterwood, the first element of which is also Brittonic, in this case the word that survives in modern Welsh as coed ("wood"). The second element may come from the word that in Welsh today is troed ("foot").

== History ==
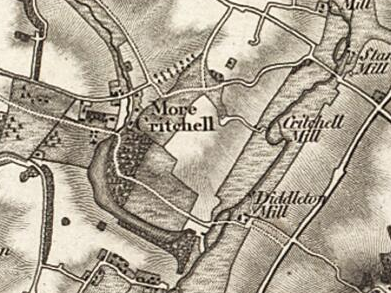
Map showing Moor Crichel in the 19th Century

At first, Moor Crichel was made up of two original settlements with different pieces of land attached to them. These two settlements were Little Crichel towards the northwest of the parish where the village was close to Norwood Park; and Moor Crichel (More Crichel) in the southeast of the parish which was close to the church of St. Mary until the latter part of the 18th Century. After this time, to make way for the extension of the park of Crichel House, the settlements were cleared and many of the inhabitants moved on to nearby Witchampton. Manswood to the west of the parish may be connected to the medieval settlement Chetterwood from 1215, although the earliest building there now is a farmhouse dated 1725.

In the Domesday Book, Moor Crichel is said to have had 38.3 households. The Lord in 1066 was King Edward but this changed in 1086 to King William who was also the tenant-in-chief for 1086.

== Notable buildings ==
Eleven structures within Moor Crichel parish have been listed by Historic England for their historical or architectural interest. Crichel House is listed as Grade I, the designation of the highest significance, and the other ten are Grade II.

=== Crichel House ===
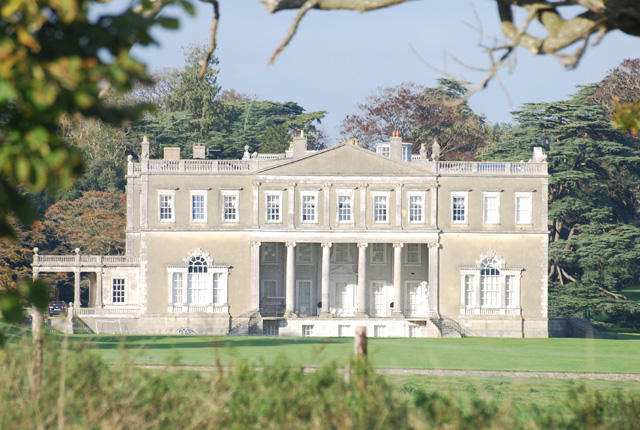
Crichel House

In the 16th Century, Crichel House was owned by the Uvedales and then ownership changed to the Sturts. The eminent judge Sir Robert Napier l bought the house in the early 1600s. In a fire in 1742, the house was ruined and was rebuilt for Sir William Napier, 2nd Baronet, a descendant of Sir Robert. When the estate was passed on in 1765 to Humphrey Sturt, the house was modified massively. To make way for new parkland, the village was moved south; due to this the original site of Moor Crichel is now beneath the lake.

In 1870–72 John Marius Wilson described Crichel House as "Critchell-Moore House is the seat of H.Sturt, Esq. The living is a rectory, united with the rectory of Long Critchell, in the diocese of Salisbury".

=== Church of St. Mary ===
The Church of St. Mary can be found in the grounds of Crichel House. In 1850, Henry Charles Sturt paid to build the Church of St Mary to replace the building which preceded it. After 1973, the church was no longer used. However, it continues to be an important part of the Crichel Estate. The parish church of St. Mary is in the grounds of Crichel House and not accessible to the public.

== Demography ==
The data used to make the observations below of Moor Crichel's demography in recent years comes from the 2011 Census for Moor Crichel parish which also includes Long Crichel.

=== Population ===
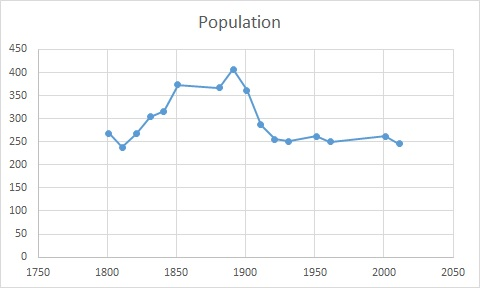
Total Population of Moor Crichel Civil Parish, Dorset, as reported by the Census of Population 1801–2011

The population of Moor Crichel started out in 1801 at 268 and then decreased slightly to 267 by 1821. After this brief period of decreasing population, the area experienced a fairly rapid increase to 374 in 1851. At this point, the population fell slightly again to 367 in 1881 only to once again experience a rapid increase to 407 in 1891 which remains to be the highest population that Moor Crichel has had to date. After this, Moor Crichel's population began to fall again until 1921 when it became fairly constant at around 255 until 1961. In more recent years, the population of Moor Crichel experienced a small rise in 2001 to 262. However, in 2011 the population fell again to around 246.

=== Occupation ===
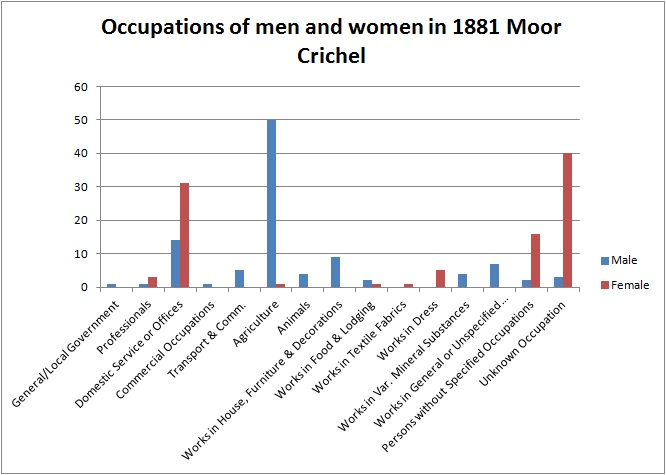
These are the numbers of men and women working in various occupations in 1881 Moor Crichel, as reported by the 1881 Census of England and Wales.

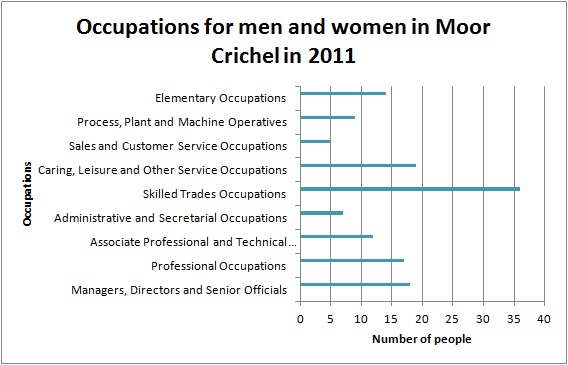
Occupations of men and women in Moor Crichel in 2011, as reported by the 2011 Census of Population.

The occupations of people in Moor Crichel changed dramatically between 1881 and 2011. In 1881 there were many more men working than there were women, with 16 women working in no specified profession and only 2 men. Most people worked in agriculture, with 50 men and 1 woman working in that industry; and the most prevalent profession for women was domestic services, with 31 women and 14 men working in that area. There were only 4 professional workers, 3 of whom were women.

By comparison in 2011, the number of people working in professional occupations had increased. There were 18 managers, directors or senior officials; 17 people in professional occupations; and 12 associate or technical professionals. In contrast, the number of people working in more agricultural-based professions decreased. Only 9 people worked in process, plant and machine operation. Skilled trades were the most prevalent occupations in 2011, employing 36 people. Of the 137 employed people living in Moor Crichel, 75 were men. The skilled trades were the most prevalent occupations with 29 men working in these professions. Out of these 137 working people, 62 of them were women. The caring, leisure or service occupations being the most prevalent among them with 16 women working in this area.

=== Age Structure ===
The largest age group in Moor Crichel according to the 2011 Census was 45–59 which accounted for 29.3% of the area's population, with the 30–44 age group being the second largest at 17.9% of the population. The largest age group in the 0–18 category is the 10–14 age group who make up a fairly large 6.9% of the population.

=== Ethnicity ===
The largest ethnic group in Moor Crichel with 96.7% of the population is White British as reported by the 2011 Census. The remaining is made up of 2.9% Irish White or Other White ethnicities and 0.4% Other Asian/Asian British.
