= Frank Coombs (artist) =

English artist (1906–1941)

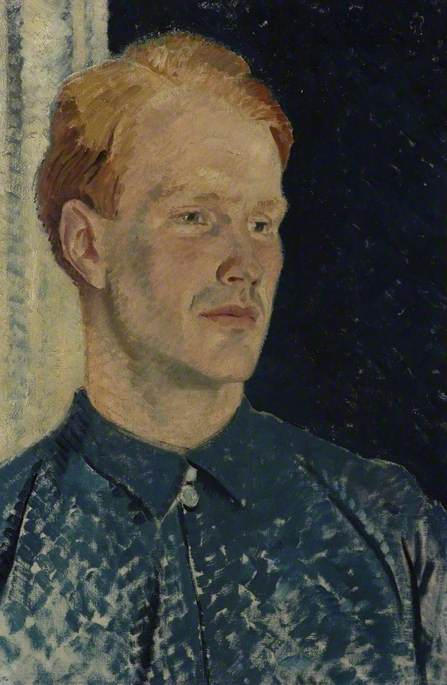
Frank Coombs, ca 1930, by Glyn Philpot

Frank Mundy Coombs (30 July 1906 – 15 April 1941) was an English painter, architect and art dealer.

== Early life ==
Frank Coombs was born in Radstock, the son of Frank and Louisa Isabel Coombs, of Bath, Somerset.

He studied art at King's School, Bruton under Arthur Jenkins.

== Career ==
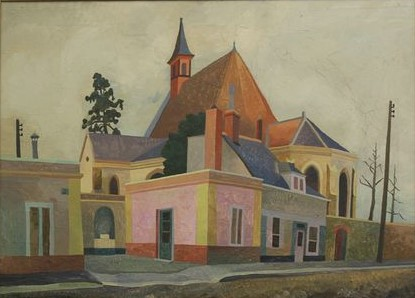
Frank Coombs, Church in Chartres

Frank Coombs qualified as an architect and worked at the Hampshire County Council. For two years, he lived in the island of Sark and there met Ala Story, while Story was on a vacation, and followed her back to London, where Story owned the Storran Gallery.

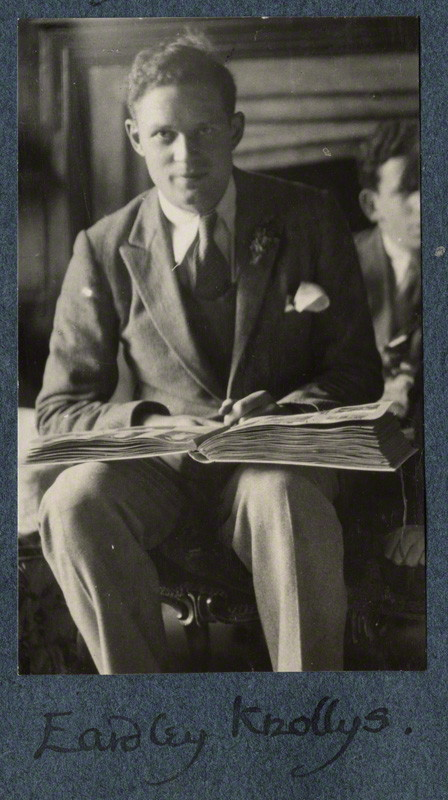
Eardley Knollys by Lady Ottoline Morrell, vintage snapshot print, late 1924

Coombs was responsible for the progressive turn of the Storran Gallery. Originally selling woodcuts and greeting cards, when Coombs joined the gallery in 1935 he organized his first show, a show that completely changed the future of the business. After that first show, Coombs, together with Eardley Knollys and Ala Story, exhibited works by Pavel Tchelitchew, Ivon Hitchens, Frances Hodgkins, Christopher Wood and Victor Pasmore. When Story sold her share to Knollys, Knollys and Coombs started to exhibit works by Pablo Picasso, Amedeo Modigliani, Maurice Utrillo, Glyn Philpot (Philpot painted Coombs' portrait), Claude Monet, Pierre-Auguste Renoir, Paul Gauguin, Maurice de Vlaminck, André Derain and Amedeo Modigliani. Under Coombs' and Knollys' direction, the Storran Gallery became one of the most notable galleries of its time promoting Modernist art.

Coombs was part of The London Group. He was among the young artists nicknamed the Cork Street Front, and exhibited with them in 1940 at the Special War-time Show hosted by the New Burlington Galleries.

Coombs and Knollys befriended many clients like Lady Ottoline Morrell, Duncan Grant and Graham Sutherland.

== Personal life ==
Coombs and Eardley Knollys were romantic partners.

== World War II and death ==
At the outbreak of World War II, Coombs joined the Royal Navy (HMS Caroline) and was killed during the Belfast Blitz by enemy action on 15 April 1941. He was buried at Belfast City Cemetery. After Coombs's death the bereaved Knollys closed the Storran Gallery in 1944.
