= Eardley Knollys =

English painter (1902–1991)

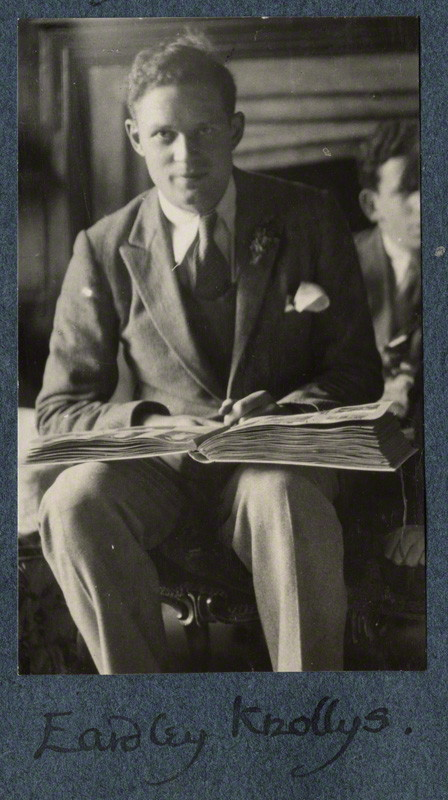
Eardley Knollys by Lady Ottoline Morrell, vintage snapshot print, late 1924

Edward Eardley Knollys (1902–1991) was a member of the Bloomsbury Group of artists - variously an art critic, art dealer and collector, active from the 1920s to 1950s. He only himself began to paint in 1949, and had his first solo exhibition at the age of 58 in 1960, by which time he was already a "minor legend in British art".

== Early life and education ==
Born in Alresford, Hampshire to Cyprian Robert Knollys (1868-1940), a land agent descended from a junior branch of the family of the Earl of Banbury and his wife Audrey (née Hill; 1871-1957), he was educated at Winchester College and Christ Church, Oxford.

== Career ==
Knollys, along with his life partner Frank Coombs ran the Storran Gallery at 106 Brompton Road, opposite Harrods, from 1936 and 1944. They sold works by artists such as Amedeo Modigliani, Maurice Utrillo and Chaïm Soutine. Coombs was killed in a World War II air raid in Belfast in 1941, which led to the bereaved Knollys closing the gallery in 1944.

In 1945, Knollys, Edward Sackville-West, 5th Baron Sackville and the music critic Desmond Shawe-Taylor jointly bought a Georgian rectory in Long Crichel, Dorset, where along with the gay activist and eye surgeon Patrick Trevor-Roper, literary critic Raymond Mortimer and James Lees-Milne, they established "what in effect was a male salon, entertaining at the weekends a galaxy of friends from the worlds of books and music". Milne recruited Knollys to join him at the National Trust during World War II, and over the next 15 years accompanied him on many of the trips to country houses recorded in his published volumes of diaries.

In 1965, Knollys inherited a large collection of artworks from Edward Sackville-West, which he added to and on his death in 1991, bequeathed to the Bulgarian emigre and picture framer Mattei Radev, a former lover of E.M. Forster. The collection, now known as The Radev Collection, consists of more than 800 works of Impressionist and Modernist art.

Several photos from the 1920s of Knollys and friends by Lady Ottoline Morrell are in the National Portrait Gallery, London.

== See also ==
- List of Bloomsbury Group people
