= The Record Guide =

English reference guide of classical music

Dust-jacket of the 1955 edition

The Record Guide was an English reference work that listed, described, and evaluated gramophone recordings of classical music in the 1950s. It was a precursor to modern guides such as The Penguin Guide to Recorded Classical Music.

== Publication history ==
The guide was conceived and written by Edward Sackville-West and the music critic Desmond Shawe-Taylor. Their aim, as set out in the preface to the first edition in 1951, was "to try to supply a guide-book to the vast available repertory of the gramophone". The book ran to 763 pages, but nevertheless confined its coverage to records available in Britain in the domestic catalogues up to and including December, 1950. A reviewer wrote of the first edition: "It is not an encyclopaedia … for the principle of it is selective rather than comprehensive. We cannot, therefore, fairly charge the authors with omissions other than those which are inadvertent. The point is made with subtlety in the introduction. 'Inadvertent omissions there are bound to be, in spite of every effort to avoid them but it should not be assumed by the reader that an unquoted record has been simply overlooked. It is much more likely to have been excluded deliberately.'"

The book considers recordings in alphabetical order of composer. Each composer section begins with an introduction assessing and describing the composer's works, after which the recordings are described and evaluated, using a star system, with two stars as the top rating. Of the introductions, the reviewer of The Gramophone wrote, "these paragraphs vary from a few lines to a couple of pages (the length being unrelated to the importance of the composer) and anyone unfamiliar with the authors would not have to read far before realising that two exceptionally intelligent musical minds had been at work."

To the keep the guide current, Sackville-West and Shawe-Taylor produced interim updates, The Record Year in 1952 and 1953. At this time the long playing record was being introduced, but records were also being issued in the old 78 r.p.m. format. By 1955 the number of new releases threatened to overwhelm the authors, who recruited two younger colleagues to help them, Andrew Porter and William Mann. Between them they produced a full new edition of The Record Guide in 1955, running to 957 pages, and a final supplement in 1956.

Four years after the last in the series of The Record Guide was published, three young musical writers emulated its layout and modus operandi in The Stereo Record Guide, which has evolved into The Penguin Guide to Recorded Classical Music.
