= Crichel =

Civil parish in Dorset, England

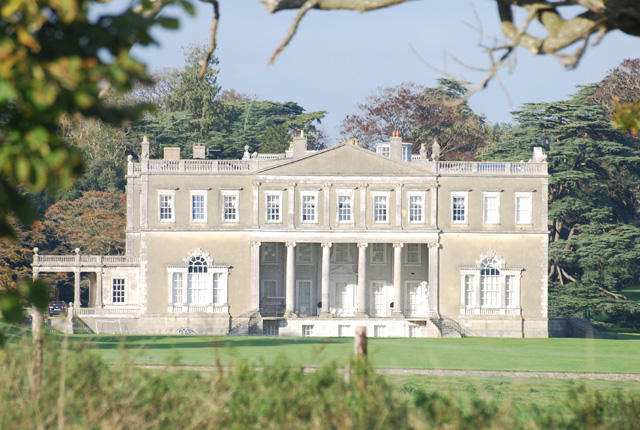
Crichel House

Crichel is a civil parish in Dorset, England. It was formed on 1 April 2015 following the merger of Long Crichel and Moor Crichel parishes.

It is near the town of Blandford Forum. The 18th century Crichel House is a Grade I listed Classical Revival country house in the parish.
