= Hoosick Falls in Winter (Grandma Moses) =

1944 painting by Grandma Moses

- Artist: Grandma Moses
- Year: 1944
- Medium: Oil paint, hardboard
- Dimensions: 50.165 cm (19.750 in) × 60.325 cm (23.750 in)
- Location: The Phillips Collection
- Accession no.: 1392

Hoosick Falls in Winter is a 1944 oil painting by the American outsider painter Grandma Moses, produced at age 84 and signed "Moses". It has been in the collection of The Phillips Collection since 1949.

It shows a scene of the artist's impression of a train crossing the Hoosic River, with figures in the village of Hoosick Falls, New York watching in a peaceful winter landscape.

This painting was one of forty selected for her to tell her story in her own words in the book Grandma Moses American Primitive: "The Hill lands of the Hoosick River were the hunting grounds of the Mohicans..."

== See also ==
- Galerie St. Etienne
