= Robert Sackville-West, 7th Baron Sackville =

British author and publisher

The Right Honourable The Lord Sackville
- Baron Sackville
- Arms of Baron Sackville
- Tenure: since 27 March 2004
- Born: Robert Bertrand Sackville-West; 10 July 1958 (age 68)
- Spouses: Catherine Bennett (m. 1985–1992) Margot MacAndrew (m. 1994)
- Issue: Freya Sackville-West; Arthur Sackville-West; Edie Sackville-West
- Heir: Arthur Sackville-West
- Parents: Hugh Rosslyn Inigo Sackville-West; Bridget Eleanor Cunliffe

Robert Bertrand Sackville-West, 7th Baron Sackville DL (born 10 July 1958), is a British publisher, author and guardian of Knole in Kent, which has been a Sackville house since 1603 and is now owned by the National Trust.

The eldest son of Hugh Rosslyn Inigo Sackville-West and Bridget Eleanor Cunliffe, he inherited the title of Baron Sackville on 27 March 2004 on the death of his uncle, Lionel Sackville-West, 6th Baron Sackville.

== Career ==
Sackville-West was educated at Winchester College and read history at Magdalen College, Oxford. He later gained an MBA at the London Business School before working as a management consultant. In 1984, he founded Toucan Books, of which he is now chairman, a packaging company which has worked with publishers on both sides of the Atlantic for more than three decades.

He was a governor of Sevenoaks School from 1995 until 2008, serving as chairman from 2002. He is currently a governor of the Knole Academy in Sevenoaks and a member of the International Baccalaureate UK board. He is also the executive chairman of several Sackville family businesses associated with property, works of art and heritage assets.

== Marriages and children ==
He first married the journalist Catherine Bennett in 1985 (marriage dissolved 1992), who has written against the Peerage system and what she considers the privileges of the nobility. He secondly married Margot Jane MacAndrew in 1994. With his second wife he has three children:

- Hon. Freya Sackville-West (born 6 August 1998)
- Hon. Arthur Sackville-West (born 25 February 2000)
- Hon. Edie Sackville-West (born 5 May 2003)

== Books ==
He is the author of two books on the story of his family.

- Inheritance: The Story of Knole and the Sackvilles (2010)
- The Disinherited: A Story of Family, Love and Betrayal (2014)

== Awards ==
- 2010 Spears Book Awards Family History of the Year Inheritance: The Story of Knole and the Sackvilles

Peerage of the United Kingdom
Preceded by Lionel Sackville-West	Baron Sackville; 2004–present	Incumbent; Heir apparent: Hon. Arthur Sackville-West
