= Lionel Sackville-West, 6th Baron Sackville =

British Baron (1913–2004)

The Lord Sackville
- Baron Sackville
- Lionel Bertrand Sackville-West, 6th Baron Sackville, in 1973
- Tenure: 4 July 1965 – 27 March 2004
- Successor: Robert Sackville-West, 7th Baron
- Born: Lionel Bertrand Sackville-West; 30 May 1913; London
- Died: 27 March 2004 (aged 90)
- Spouses: Jacobine Napier Hichens (née Menzies-Wilson); Arlie Roebuck de Guingand (née Woodhead); Jean Imbert-Terry (née Garton)
- Issue: Teresa Sackville-West; Catherine Jacobine Sackville-West; Sophia Anne Sackville-West; Victoria Mary Sackville-West; Sarah Elizabeth Sackville-West
- Parents: Bertrand Sackville-West; Eva Inigo-Jones

Lionel Bertrand Sackville-West, 6th Baron Sackville (30 May 1913 – 27 March 2004) was a stockbroker and member of the British peerage. In 1965, he became the sixth Baron Sackville.

== Early life ==
Born in London, Sackville-West was the eldest son of Bertrand Sackville-West and Eva Inigo-Jones. He spent his early years in Sussex. During the First World War, he famously wrote to King George V, "When will the War be over? I miss my daddy and having sugar on my porridge", and received the personal reply, "I hope the War will be over soon and that your daddy will come back. I too miss having sugar on my porridge."

== Education and military service ==
In 1935, having completed his studies at Winchester and Magdalen College, Oxford, Sackville-West obtained a position with Jardine Matheson in Shanghai. This was cut short when the Japanese invaded China, however, and he returned to England in 1939 and joined the Army. He served in the Coldstream Guards in North Africa and in 1942 was captured at Tobruk, spending the next year in a prison camp at Chieti, 200 km northeast of Rome. After the surrender of Italy in 1943 he was removed by the German Army to a prison camp near Brandenburg, where he spent the remainder of the war.

== Career ==
On his return home from the war, Sackville-West began a career with Lloyd's of London, where he remained until his retirement in 1978.

== Family life and inheritance ==
Coat of arms of Baron Sackville

Sackville-West's marriage to Jacobine Hichens (née Menzies-Wilson) in 1953 produced five daughters, and on the birth of each one, his cousin Vita Sackville-West wrote a letter bemoaning the failure to produce a male heir for the Knole estate. Vita was greatly affected by the fact that, as a woman, she was barred from inheriting Knole from her father; the heartache caused by losing the estate to her cousins marked the rest of her life, and her relationship with the rest of her family.

By the late 1950s, when it became apparent that his cousin Eddy was likely to remain a bachelor and produce no heir to the estate his uncle Charles, 4th Baron Sackville, invited him to take over the running of Knole (the house and some of its contents by now having become the responsibility of the National Trust) and the other family estates. Charles died in 1962 and Eddy assumed the title as the 5th Baron Sackville, but never lived at Knole.

In 1960 Lionel moved his family into Knole, and he and Jacobine rapidly became accomplished hosts, with the house positively buzzing with dinners, parties and dances throughout the decade. In 1965 his cousin Eddy died, and he finally fully inherited the estate and title of the 6th Baron Sackville.

Jacobine died of cancer in 1971, marking the beginning of Sackville-West's self-confessed "black dog" of depression from which he would suffer at intervals for the rest of his life.

== Achievements ==
Sackville-West's greatest achievement is considered to have been the comprehensive restoration of the park and gardens of the family seat at Knole, Sevenoaks. He had a great passion for forestry, personally planting large tracts of new woodland as well as tending the ancient landscaping which had been first laid out by his ancestor, the 3rd Duke of Dorset.

Following the disastrous storm across the south of England in October 1987, when much of the park at Knole was devastated, Sackville-West faced the ruins of most of his hard work from the previous 25 years with good humour and embarked anew on a process of replanting and clearing. He replanted over 250,000 trees after this storm, nearly all with his own hands. He later admitted that the storm had in fact been a good thing in that it cleared some ancient trees which would have been otherwise protected and allowed for a much more wide-reaching restoration.

Sackville-West continued this work until the end of his life. In 1998 he came second to Lord Egremont of Petworth in a forestry competition, beating the Queen into third place. At the time, he dryly commented that at least one of the finalists "was unlikely to have done the work with her own hands".

== Other marriages ==
In 1974 Sackville-West married Arlie, Lady de Guingard (née Woodhead), but this marriage was later dissolved. In 1983 he married Jean, Lady Imbert-Terry (née Garton).

== Death ==
Sackville-West died at the age of 90. Upon his death the title and estate was inherited by his nephew, Robert Bertrand Sackville-West.

Peerage of the United Kingdom
Preceded by Edward Sackville-West	Baron Sackville; 1965–2004	Succeeded by Robert Sackville-West
