= William Gronow-Davis =

British artist (1941-2015)

William Gronow-Davis (1941 – 20 September 2015) was an Indian-born British artist. He was the last partner of Michael Pitt-Rivers and inherited from him the Rushmore Estate in Wiltshire.

== Career ==
Gronow-Davis was an established artist and held bi-annual exhibitions. He and his partner Pitt-Rivers were both collectors of art, especially Asian works of art. After his death in 2016, Gronow-Davis's art collection was auctioned by Duke's of Dorchester.

== Personal life ==
Gronow-Davis was the partner of Michael Pitt-Rivers, conservationist and owner of the Rushmore Estate, and moved to King John’s House, near the estate at Tollard Royal, Wiltshire in 1961. Their relationship began after Pitt-Rivers' marriage ended in 1965. When Pitt-Rivers died in 1999, the Trust which runs the estate was inherited by Gronow-Davis.

== Rushmore Estate ==
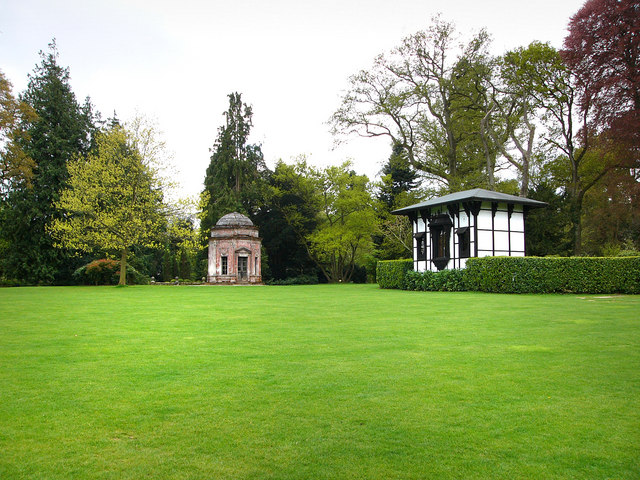
Larmer Tree Gardens

The Rushmore Estate had been in the Pitt-Rivers family for generations and includes the Larmer Tree Gardens pleasure grounds.

In 2009 Gronow-Davis built a 65ft folly, the tallest folly to be built in England in more than 100 years.

At his death, on 20 September 2015, the Larmer Tree Gardens estate was valued at £50 million.
