= St Mary's Church, Long Crichel =

Coordinates: 50.8919°N 2.0334°W

- St Mary's Church, Long Crichel, from the southeast

- Location in Dorset
- OS grid reference: ST 978 103
- Location: Long Crichel, Dorset
- Country: England
- Denomination: Anglican

History
- Status: Parish church

Architecture
- Functional status: Redundant
- Heritage designation: Grade II
- Designated: 18 March 1955
- Architectural type: Church
- Style: Gothic, Gothic Revival
- Completed: 1851

Specifications
- Materials: Flint and ashlar Tiled toofs

St Mary's Church is in the village of Long Crichel, Dorset, England. It is a redundant Anglican parish church that has been under the care of the Friends of Friendless Churches since 2010. The church is recorded in the National Heritage List for England as a designated Grade II listed building.

== History ==
The tower of the church dates from the 15th century, and the rest of the church was rebuilt in 1851. It was declared redundant on 1 July 2003, and was vested in the Friends of Friendless Churches during 2010.

== Architecture ==
The church is constructed in bands of ashlar and flint, with ashlar dressings. Its roofs are tiled; it has stone slate at the margins, and stone copings. The plan consists of a nave, an apsidal chancel, north and south transepts, and a west tower. The tower is Perpendicular in style. It is in two stages, with diagonal buttresses on the west corners, and a stair turret to the north. In its lower stage is a three-light west window and a south doorway with a gabled porch inscribed with a bishop's mitre. In the upper stage are two-light bell openings with pointed heads. At the summit of the tower is an embattled parapet, pinnacles, and gargoyles. Along the sides of the nave are square-headed two-light windows. The south transept has a brattished parapet. It contains a two-light south window, a single-light west window, and a door on the east side. In the north transept are lancet windows on the east and west sides, a traceried window on the north side, and an east door. The chancel has buttresses rising to crocketed pinnacles, an openwork parapet, and single-light windows.

The interior of the church is more Georgian than Gothic Revival in style. The octagonal font dates from the 15th century, and is in Purbeck marble. Also in the church is a memorial brass dating from about 1360.
