= Long Crichel =

Village in Dorset, England

Coordinates: 50.891°N 2.034°W

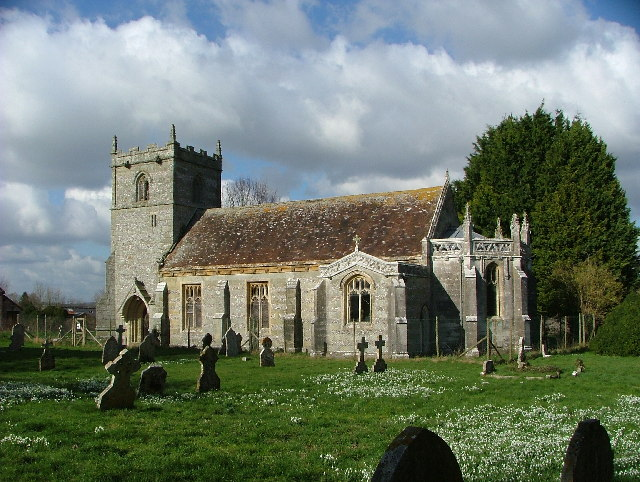
- St Mary's Church

- Location within Dorset
- Population: 81
- OS grid reference: ST977102
- Civil parish: Crichel
- Unitary authority: Dorset
- Ceremonial county: Dorset
- Region: South West
- Country: England
- Sovereign state: United Kingdom
- Post town: WIMBORNE
- Postcode district: BH21
- Dialling code: 01258
- Police: Dorset
- Fire: Dorset and Wiltshire
- Ambulance: South Western
- UK Parliament: North Dorset

Long Crichel (/ˈkrɪtʃəl/) is a small village and former civil parish, now in the parish of Crichel, in east Dorset, England, situated on Cranborne Chase five miles northeast of Blandford Forum. In 2001 it had a population of 81. The civil parish was abolished on 1 April 2015 and merged with Moor Crichel to form Crichel.

== Etymology ==
The name of Long Crichel is first attested in the Domesday Book of 1086 as Circel, with forms such as Crechel attested from 1204 onwards. This name comes from the Common Brittonic word *crüg ("mound, hill, barrow"), compounded with the Old English word hyll, meaning the same thing: this Old English element was added to the name after Old English became the dominant language in the area and the Brittonic name of the settlement was no longer understood. The addition of long, to distinguish the settlement from Moor Crichel, is first attested in 1208, in the form Langecrechel.

== Crichel Estate ==
Long Crichel village and surrounding lands were once part of the Crichel Estate for many centuries, before it was broken up. The estate's owners lived at Crichel House in Moor Crichel.

== St Mary's Church ==
The village church is St Mary's Church, Long Crichel. The tower of the church dates from the 15th century, and the rest of the church was rebuilt in 1851. It closed in 2001, was declared redundant on 1 July 2003, and was vested in the Friends of Friendless Churches in 2010. The Friends restored the Grade II listed church's medieval tower and east stained glass window. Christian services can still take place in the church and burials are still allowed in the churchyard, which is now the responsibility of the neighbouring Witchampton church council.

== Long Crichel House ==
Long Crichel House, Dorset, built 1786

Long Crichel House, the Grade II listed Georgian rectory, was bought jointly in 1945 by Edward Sackville-West, the music critic Desmond Shawe-Taylor and artist and art dealer Eardley Knollys, who along with architectural historian James Lees-Milne, literary critic Raymond Mortimer and the gay activist and eye surgeon Patrick Trevor-Roper, established "one of the last great post-war salons, hosting guests including Sibyl Colefax, Anthony Asquith, Graham Sutherland, Lord Berners, Nancy Mitford, Benjamin Britten, Laurie Lee, Ben Nicolson, Cecil Day-Lewis and Graham Greene." Somerset Maugham and E.M. Forster were also visitors.

Vanessa Bell and Duncan Grant stayed at the house; Bell did a number of paintings of it and made painted plates for it, while Grant designed the dining room curtains.

Sackville-West died in 1965 and Knollys and his friend Mattei Radev bought another country home in Hampshire in 1967. Shawe-Taylor remained at Long Crichel House until he died there, aged 88, on 1 November 1995, following a country walk.
