= Lionel Sackville-West =

Lionel Sackville-West may refer to:

- Lionel Sackville-West, 2nd Baron Sackville, British diplomat
- Lionel Sackville-West, 3rd Baron Sackville, British peer
- Lionel Sackville-West, 6th Baron Sackville, British peer and stockbroker
