= McDonnell Farm (Grandma Moses) =

1943 painting by Grandma Moses

The McDonnell Farm
- McDonell Farm
- Artist: Grandma Moses
- Year: 1943
- Medium: Oil paint, hardboard
- Subject: Old MacDonald Had a Farm
- Location: The Phillips Collection
- Accession no.: 1393

The McDonnell Farm is a 1943 oil painting by the American outsider painter Grandma Moses, produced at age 83 and signed "Moses". It has been in the collection of The Phillips Collection since 1944.

It shows the artist's impression of the song "Old MacDonald Had a Farm", with the central white farmhouse on a hill overlooking the various barns that house the animals and farmhands working the fields. To the right is a haystack with children playing.

This painting was one of forty selected for her to tell her story in her own words in the book Grandma Moses American Primitive: "Away back in 1840, the farms were large, and they had many hired men, to till the land, as they raised all of their food, such as wheat, corn, oats, rhy [sic] and buckwheat and lots of lifestock [sic], horses, cows, sheep, this called for woork [sic]. From the sheep, they spun the wool for yarn, to be woven in cloth for Blankets and Cloathing [sic]. They did ther [sic] own weaveing [sic]. Thir [sic] sweets was obtained from the bees and the maple trees, in the spring of the year. The Geese, turkeys, ducks, and hens, were the womens [sic] care, there was allwise [sic] a plenty of food, but no idle hands. It could well be called McDonell Farm, with a yuck-yuck here, ba-ba there, and a cluck-cluck everywhere...."

== See also ==
- Galerie St. Etienne
