= Wolfenden report =

Departmental committee report (1957)

The Report of the Departmental Committee on Homosexual Offences and Prostitution (better known as the Wolfenden report, after Sir John Wolfenden, the chairman of the committee) was published in the United Kingdom on 4 September 1957 after a succession of well-known men, including Lord Montagu of Beaulieu, Michael Pitt-Rivers, John Gielgud and Peter Wildeblood were convicted of homosexual offences. It recommended the decriminalisation of homosexual activity between consenting adults.

== Background ==
Under the Criminal Law Amendment Act 1885, any homosexual activity between males was illegal. After the Second World War, there had been an increase in arrests and prosecutions, and by the end of 1954, in England and Wales, there were 1,069 men in prison for homosexual acts, with a mean age of 37 years. During a time of several significant trials, notably that of Lord Montagu of Beaulieu, the Conservative government set up a departmental committee (in the Home Office and Scottish Home Department responsible for criminal law) under John Wolfenden to consider both homosexual offences and prostitution.

== Committee ==
The committee of 15 (4 women and 11 men) was led by Sir John Wolfenden (1906–1985), a former headmaster of both Uppingham School and of Shrewsbury School; and who in 1950 was appointed Vice Chancellor of the University of Reading. He later became Director of the British Museum.

In addition to the chairman, the committee members were the following:

- James Adair, former procurator fiscal for Glasgow
- Mary Cohen, vice-president of the City of Glasgow Girl Guides and chairwoman of the Scottish Association of Girls' Clubs
- Desmond Curran, senior psychiatrist at St George's Hospital, London, and psychiatric consultant to the Royal Navy
- V. A. Demant, Anglo-Catholic priest serving as Canon of Christ Church, Oxford, and Regius Professor of Moral and Pastoral Theology at the University of Oxford
- Sir Kenneth Diplock, Recorder of Oxford and High Court judge
- Sir Hugh Linstead, Conservative Member of Parliament (MP) for Putney, barrister, and pharmaceutical chemist
- Peter Kerr, 12th Marquess of Lothian, a Foreign Office minister
- Kathleen Lovibond, chairwoman of the Uxbridge juvenile magistrates' court and member of the Conservative women's organisation who became Mayor of Uxbridge in 1956
- Victor Mishcon, solicitor and Labour member and chairman of the London County Council
- Goronwy Rees, Principal of the University College of Wales, Aberystwyth (resigned from the committee in April 1956)
- R. F. V. Scott, Presbyterian minister of St Columba's Church, London (Church of Scotland) (resigned from the committee in March 1956)
- Lady (Lily) Stopford, ophthalmologist and magistrate
- William Wells, Labour MP for Walsall North and barrister
- Joseph Whitby, general practitioner with psychiatric experience

The committee first met on 15 September 1954 and met on 62 days, 32 of which were used for interviewing witnesses. Wolfenden suggested at an early stage that, for the sake of the ladies in the room, they use the terms Huntley & Palmers after the biscuit manufacturers – Huntleys for homosexuals, and Palmers for prostitutes. Evidence was heard from police and probation officers, psychiatrists, religious leaders (who in those days were at the forefront of homosexual law reform), and gay men whose lives had been affected by the law.

The estimated cost of preparing the report was £8,046 of which £735 represented the estimated cost of printing and publication. The secretary for the committee was W. C. Roberts (Home Office) and his assistant was E. J. Freeman (Scottish Home Department).

Getting gay men to give evidence proved to be very difficult for the committee: Wolfenden considered placing an advert in a newspaper or magazine, but the committee instead decided to locate three men willing to give evidence: Peter Wildeblood, Carl Winter, and Patrick Trevor-Roper. Wildeblood had been convicted and sent to prison. Winter was director of the Fitzwilliam Museum and Trevor-Roper was an eye surgeon and brother of the historian Hugh Trevor-Roper. In order to protect their identities, Trevor-Roper was referred to as the "Doctor" while Winter was referred to as "Mr White".

== Recommendations ==
The committee recommended that "homosexual behaviour between consenting adults in private should no longer be a criminal offence". All but James Adair were in favour of this and, contrary to some medical and psychiatric witnesses' evidence at that time, found that "homosexuality cannot legitimately be regarded as a disease, because in many cases it is the only symptom and is compatible with full mental health in other respects." The report added:

The law's function is to preserve public order and decency, to protect the citizen from what is offensive or injurious, and to provide sufficient safeguards against exploitation and corruption of others ... It is not, in our view, the function of the law to intervene in the private life of citizens, or to seek to enforce any particular pattern of behaviour.

The recommended age of consent was 21 years (the age of majority in the UK then, though for mixed sex couples the age of consent was 16 and 16-year-olds could marry with their parents' permission).

The report also discussed the rise in street prostitution at the time, which it associated with "community instability" and "weakening of the family". As a result, there was a police crackdown on street prostitution following the report and the Street Offences Act 1959 was passed.

== Aftermath ==
The report's recommendations attracted considerable public debate, including an exchange of views in publications by Lord Devlin, a leading British judge, whose ideas and publications argued against the report's philosophical basis, and H. L. A. Hart, a leading jurisprudential scholar, who provided argument in its support.

In The Enforcement of Morals, Devlin states that the Wolfenden report "is recognized to be an excellent study of two very difficult legal and social problems". Devlin attacks the principle, derived from John Stuart Mill's On Liberty, that the law ought not concern itself with "private immorality", saying that the report "requires special circumstances to be shown to justify the intervention of the law. I think that this is wrong in principle".

In late 1957, shortly after the report was published, the General Assembly of the Church of England, by a vote of 155 to 138, passed a resolution "That this Assembly generally approves the principles on which the criminal law concerned with sexual behaviour should be based as stated by the Wolfenden Committee, and also its recommendations relating to homosexuality, but considers that the recommendations relating to prostitution require further study".

The recommendations eventually led to the passage of the Sexual Offences Act 1967, applying to England and Wales only, that replaced the previous law on sodomy contained in the Offences against the Person Act 1861 and the 1885 Labouchere Amendment which outlawed every homosexual act short of sodomy. The Act did not become law until a decade after the report was published in 1957.

The historian Patrick Higgins has described a number of flaws with the report, such as "its failure to understand or appreciate (except in the most negative terms) the importance of the homosexual subculture".

It later became known publicly, (in 2017), that Wolfenden's son Jeremy Wolfenden was gay when historian Roger Lockyer stated the fact in a BBC interview.

In 1997, John Wolfenden came 45th in the Pink Paper’s list of the “top 500 lesbian and gay heroes”.

== See also ==
- Homosexual Law Reform Society
- LGBT rights in the United Kingdom
- Victim (1961 film) – 1961 film starring Dirk Bogarde widely held to have contributed to the liberalisation of cultural and legal attitudes to homosexuality in the UK.
- Consenting Adults – television play by Julian Mitchell with Charles Dance as Sir John Wolfenden.
