= Raymond Mortimer =

British writer, critic and literary editor (1895–1980)

Raymond Mortimer CBE
- Born: Charles Raymond Bell Mortimer; 25 April 1895; Knightsbridge, London, England
- Died: 9 January 1980 (aged 84)
- Education: Malvern College
- Alma mater: Balliol College, Oxford
- Occupations: Writer, critic and literary editor

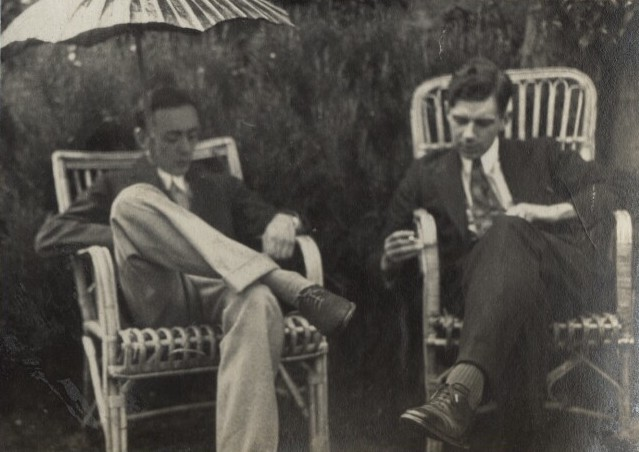
Edward Sackville-West, with Mortimer (right), at Garsington Manor, June 1923.

Charles Raymond Bell Mortimer CBE (25 April 1895 – 9 January 1980), who wrote under the name Raymond Mortimer, was a British writer on art and literature, known mostly as a critic and literary editor.

== Biography ==
Mortimer was born in Knightsbridge, London, and was brought up in Redhill, Surrey. He was educated at Malvern College and Balliol College, Oxford, which he entered in 1913 to read history. His studies were interrupted by service in a hospital in France from 1915 and then work in the Foreign Office. He did not complete his degree.

In the 1920s, he was in Paris, writing fiction. A Francophile, Mortimer broke down in tears when he heard on 21 June 1940 that France had signed an armistice with Germany, saying it was as if half of England had just fallen into the sea. He later became literary editor of the New Statesman, worked at the BBC and in liaison with the Free French in World War II, and subsequently as a book reviewer for The Sunday Times. He was appointed a Commander of the Order of the British Empire (CBE) in the 1955 Birthday Honours.

He was a friend of the poet and novelist Vita Sackville-West, and was involved in a long-term relationship with her husband, the author and British diplomat Harold Nicolson in the 1920s. Mortimer joined the three owners of Long Crichel House in Dorset, friends Edward Sackville West, Desmond Shawe-Taylor and Eardley Knollys, as one of the residents, after World War II. There they held salons, entertaining some of the great literary and artistic figures of the day, including E. M. Forster, Nancy Mitford, Benjamin Britten, Laurie Lee, Ben Nicolson and Graham Greene.

He and Geddes Hyslop lived together for most of their 40-year relationship.
