= Charles Sackville-West, 4th Baron Sackville =

British Army general

Major-General The Right Honourable The Lord Sackville KBE CB CMG
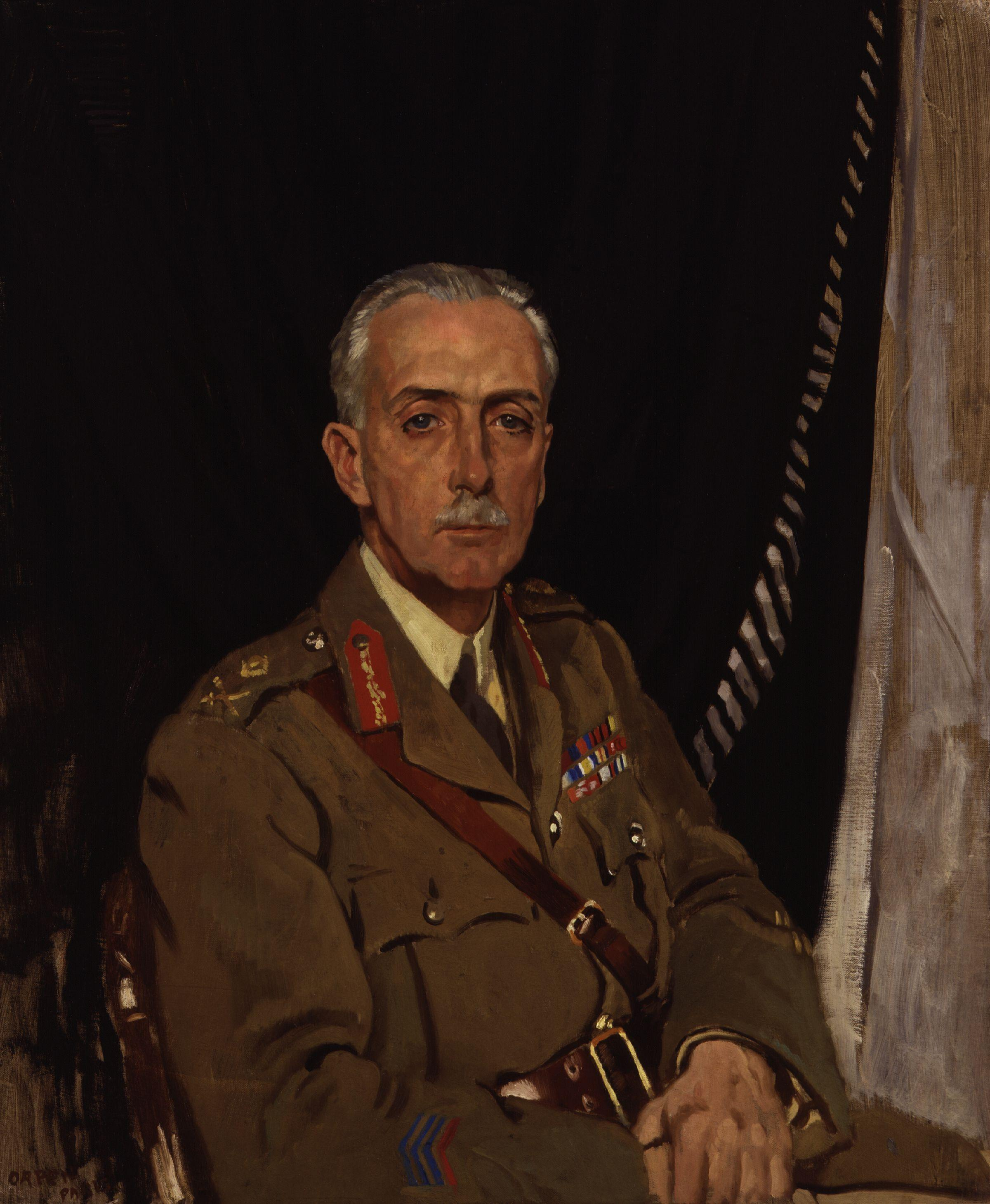
- Portrait by Sir William Orpen, 1919
- Born: Charles John Sackville-West; 10 August 1870
- Died: 8 May 1962 (aged 91)
- Spouse(s): Maud Cecilia Bell; Anne Bigelow (née Meredith)
- Relatives: William Edward Sackville-West (father); Georgina Dodwell (mother); Edward Charles Sackville-West (son); Diana Joan Sackville-West (daughter)
- Military career
- Allegiance: United Kingdom
- Branch: British Army
- Service years: 1889 – 1929
- Rank: Major-General
- Unit: King's Royal Rifle Corps
- Commands: 21st Infantry Brigade
- Conflicts: Anglo-Manipur War; Second Boer War; First World War: Western Front; Battle of the Somme
- Awards: Knight Commander of the Order of the British Empire; Companion of the Order of the Bath; Companion of the Order of St Michael and St George
- Other work: Military attaché to France; Lieutenant Governor of Guernsey; Baron Sackville

Major-General Charles John Sackville-West, 4th Baron Sackville, KBE, CB, CMG (10 August 1870 – 8 May 1962) was a British Army general and peer who served throughout the First World War and reached the rank of major general. In 1919, he was British Military Representative on the Supreme War Council and from 1920 to 1924 he was military attaché in Paris. He inherited his title on 28 January 1928 on the death of his brother, Lionel Edward Sackville-West, 3rd Baron Sackville. He served as Lieutenant Governor of Guernsey.

== Early life and career ==
Sackville-West was born in 1870, the second son of Colonel the Hon. William Edward Sackville-West and Georgina Dodwell. His father was the youngest son of the 5th Earl De La Warr and a younger brother of the 1st and 2nd Barons Sackville. As the younger son of a younger son of an earl, Sackville-West was not entitled to any particular style from birth, though his elder brother succeeded to the title of Lord Sackville in 1908. On 14 June 1910, however, he and his siblings were granted the style of Honourable by royal decree, to "henceforth have hold and enjoy the same title, rank, place and precedence as would have been due to them if their father, William Edward Sackville-West had survived his brother, the said Lionel Sackville, Baron Sackville, and had thereby succeeded to the title and dignity of Baron Sackville."

Sackville-West was educated at Winchester College, Hampshire, followed by the Royal Military College, Sandhurst.

On 18 December 1889, Sackville-West was commissioned into the King's Royal Rifle Corps as a second lieutenant and participated in the 1891 Anglo-Manipur War (for which he was mentioned in dispatches) and the 1892 expedition to Burma. He was promoted to lieutenant on 4 November 1891, and appointed to succeed Reginald Oxley as an adjutant on 1 May 1894. By the mid-1890s, Sackville-West was serving as a staff officer in a number of posts. He was promoted to captain on 27 January 1898, and on 9 October was seconded to the staff and appointed an aide-de-camp to General Sir Redvers Buller, later a prominent commander in the Second Boer War. He also served with the 14 Provisional battalion during this war. For his services during the war, Sackville-West received a brevet promotion to major on 29 November 1900, and was also mentioned in dispatches.

Following his return from the war, Sackville-West was in October 1901 appointed Aide-de-camp to Lieutenant-General Sir Henry Hildyard, Commanding the 1st Army Corps. He returned to his regiment in late 1902, but was seconded to attend Staff college early the following year, and was appointed a staff captain in January 1905. He was promoted to major on 2 August 1905. In 1906, Sackville-West was attached to the Staff College, Camberley, receiving an appointment as a deputy assistant adjutant-general with the temporary rank of lieutenant-colonel on 21 December. He was appointed a GSO 2 for the London District on 27 November 1909. He was transferred to the War Office in the same grade on 1 October 1910, receiving promotions to brevet lieutenant-colonel and then to substantive lieutenant-colonel on 1 April 1914.

== First World War ==
At the outbreak of the First World War in the summer of 1914, Sackville-West was serving at the War Office. He was appointed as GSO1, effectively chief of staff, of the 12th (Eastern) Division, a Kitchener's Army formation, on 16 January 1915. However, the need for experienced officers in the field prompted his movement to the Indian Army Corps on the Western Front until 3 December, when he was given command of the 21st Infantry Brigade, then part of the 7th Division, and promoted to temporary brigadier general, taking over from Lieutenant Colonel Ralph Berners.

On 30 July 1916, at the height of the Battle of the Somme, Sackville-West was wounded in an attack by a German bomber on his brigade headquarters. Evacuated to Britain, he had recovered by October, when he took over the 190th Infantry Brigade. Within days of this posting, however, Sackville-West was wounded in the jaw when a high-explosive shell detonated in the midst of his command group as he inspected the trenches in front of Hamel. Although wounded, dazed and partially buried, Sackville-West was able to reach the casualty clearing station unaided, and was again evacuated to Britain to recover.

He was promoted to brevet colonel in January 1917. Returning to the Western Front for the third time in March, Sackville-West commanded the 61st (2nd South Midland) Division's 182nd (Warwickshire) Infantry Brigade from 11 March until 18 November, when he was appointed brigadier general on the general staff, serving as chief of staff to General Sir Henry Wilson on the Supreme War Council. On 19 February 1918 Wilson became chief of the imperial general staff (CIGS) at the War Office, and Sackville-West succeeded him as British military representative at Versailles. He was promoted to the substantive rank of colonel on 1 April, with seniority from 12 February 1916, and to substantive major general on 1 January 1919, with his temporary rank backdated to 18 November 1917.

Sackville-West received several decorations during his wartime service. He was appointed a Companion of the Order of St. Michael and St. George (CMG) on 18 February 1915, and was knighted as a Knight Commander of the Order of the British Empire (KBE) in the 1919 Birthday Honours on 3 June 1919. He was also decorated as a Commander of the Legion of Honour of France in 1918 and as a Grand Officer of the Order of the Crown of Italy in 1919. In 1921, he was decorated with the Italian Cross of War, followed by the Croix de guerre of France.

== Later career ==
From 15 January 1920 until 15 January 1924, Sackville-West was military attaché in Paris. From 1 July 1925 to his retirement on 5 June 1929 he served as Lieutenant Governor of Guernsey.

== Family ==
Sackville-West married Maude Cecilia Bell in 1897, with whom he had one son and one daughter. In 1924 he married for a second time, to Mrs Anne Meredith Bigelow. In 1928, on the death of his elder brother Lionel Sackville-West, Charles inherited his uncle's title of Baron Sackville and sat in the House of Lords until his death in 1962. His son Edward inherited the title and later became a noted author.

== Notes ==
Government offices
| Preceded by Sir John Capper | Lieutenant Governor of Guernsey; 1925–1929 | Succeeded by Lord Ruthven |
Peerage of the United Kingdom
| Preceded by Lionel Sackville-West | Baron Sackville; 1928–1962 | Succeeded by Edward Sackville-West |
