= Baron Sackville =

Barony in the Peerage of the United Kingdom

Barony of Sackville
- Creation date: 2 October 1876
- Created by: Queen Victoria
- Peerage: Peerage of the United Kingdom
- First holder: Mortimer Sackville-West
- Present holder: Robert Sackville-West, 7th Baron
- Heir apparent: Hon. Arthur Sackville-West
- Remainder to: the 1st Baron's heirs male of the body lawfully begotten, with remainder, failing heirs male of his body, to his younger brothers.
- Seat: Knole House

Baron Sackville, of Knole in the County of Kent, is a title in the Peerage of the United Kingdom. It was created in 1876 for the Honourable Mortimer Sackville-West, with remainder, failing heirs male of his body, to his younger brothers the Hon. Lionel and the Hon. William Edward. Sackville-West was the fourth son of George Sackville-West, 5th Earl De La Warr and Elizabeth Sackville-West, Countess De La Warr and 1st Baroness Buckhurst, younger daughter and co-heir of John Sackville, 3rd Duke of Dorset. On the death of the latter's cousin, Charles Sackville-Germain, 5th Duke of Dorset, in 1845, the dukedom and its subsidiary titles became extinct and the Sackville estates passed through Elizabeth to the West family who assumed the additional surname of Sackville by Royal licence. By arrangement, Mortimer Sackville-West succeeded to a substantial part of the estates, including Knole in Kent, which is still the seat of the Barons Sackville.

He was succeeded in the barony according to the special remainder by his brother Lionel, who became the second Baron. He had no legitimate male issue and, on his death, the title passed to his nephew, the third Baron. He was the son of the aforementioned William Edward. He was succeeded by his younger brother, the fourth Baron. He was a major-general in the army. On his death the title passed to his son, the fifth Baron, and then to the latter's cousin, the sixth Baron. He was the eldest son of the Hon. Bertrand George Sackville-West, youngest brother of the fourth Baron. As of 2015 the title is held by his nephew, the seventh Baron, who succeeded in 2004. He is the son of Hugh Rosslyn Inigo Sackville-West, younger brother of the sixth Baron.

The poet Vita Sackville-West was the daughter of the third Baron and his wife Victoria Sackville-West, daughter of the second Baron.

== Barons Sackville (1876) ==
- Mortimer Sackville-West, 1st Baron Sackville (1820–1888)
- Lionel Sackville-West, 2nd Baron Sackville (1827–1908)
- Lionel Edward Sackville-West, 3rd Baron Sackville (1867–1928)
- Charles John Sackville-West, 4th Baron Sackville (1870–1962)
- Edward Charles Sackville-West, 5th Baron Sackville (1901–1965)
- Lionel Bertrand Sackville-West, 6th Baron Sackville (1913–2004)
- Robert Bertrand Sackville-West, 7th Baron Sackville (b. 1958)

The heir apparent is the present holder's son Hon. Arthur George Sackville-West (b. 2000).

== Arms ==
Coat of arms of Baron Sackville
| Crest 1st, out of a ducal coronet or, a griffin’s head azure, beaked and eared gold; 2nd, out of a coronet composed of a fleur-de-lis or, an estoile argent. Escutcheon Quarterly: 1st and 4th argent, a fess dancettee sable (West), 2nd and 3rd or and gules, a bend vair (Sackville). Supporters On either side a griffin azure, beaked and eared or, ducally gorged gold, therefrom pendant an escutcheon, that on the dexter charged with the arms of West, and that on the sinister with the arms of Sackville. Motto Jour de ma vie. (The day of my life) |

== See also ==
- Earl De La Warr
- Duke of Dorset
- Baroness Buckhurst
- Vita Sackville-West
- Victoria Sackville-West
- Orlando: A Biography
- Transactions involving actual peppercorns

== Notes ==
- Kidd, Charles, ed. (1903). Debrett's peerage, baronetage, knightage, and companionage. London: Dean and son. p. 758.
- Leigh Rayment's Peerage Pages
