= Desmond Shawe-Taylor (music critic) =

British writer and music critic (1907–1995)

Desmond Christopher Shawe-Taylor, (29 May 1907 – 1 November 1995), was a British writer, co-writer of The Record Guide, music critic of the New Statesman, The New Yorker and The Sunday Times and a regular and long-standing contributor to The Gramophone.

== Biography ==
Long Crichel House, Dorset, the home Shawe-Taylor shared with Edward Sackville-West and Eardley Knollys

Shawe-Taylor was born in Dublin, the elder of two sons of Francis Manley Shawe-Taylor (1869–1920), magistrate and high sheriff for the county of Galway, and his wife, Agnes Mary Eleanor née Ussher (1874–1939). His parents were members of the Anglo-Irish ruling classes; he was related to the playwright and co-founder of the Abbey Theatre, Lady Gregory and a cousin of Sir Hugh Lane who founded Dublin's gallery of modern art. His childhood was brutally interrupted by his father's murder. He was sent to be educated in England, at Shrewsbury School and Oriel College, Oxford, where he graduated in 1930 with a first class degree in English. He then spent time in Germany and Austria before his first job, with the Royal Geographical Society in London. From 1933 he began to contribute musical, literary, and film reviews to various London journals, including the New Statesman.

During World War II Shawe-Taylor served in the Royal Artillery. After the war he returned to The New Statesman, taking on the post of music critic. In 1958 he was invited to succeed Ernest Newman as chief music critic of The Sunday Times. This, as The Times observed, was not an easy task. Newman, who retired just before his 90th birthday, had been the paper's music critic since 1920, and was a legendary figure. Shawe-Taylor was a success as Newman's replacement, and he remained at The Sunday Times until his own semi-retirement in 1983. His years on the paper were broken only by a season as guest critic of The New Yorker from 1973 to 1974.

In 1948 Shawe-Taylor wrote a short historical work Covent Garden about opera audiences and changing operatic styles. It was the only book for which he was solely responsible, but in 1951 he collaborated with Edward Sackville-West to research and write The Record Guide, a pioneering reference work discussing and grading currently available classical records. This was followed by a series of updates and an enlarged new edition between 1952 and 1956.

The long-established music magazine The Gramophone wrote of him, "His writing combined acute perception with an easy erudition that stemmed from wide cultural interests. Although a man of catholic musical tastes, he was a particular authority on singing." The Oxford Dictionary of National Biography said, "He became the most perceptive critic of singing among his colleagues, delighting in voices from an age preserved on his oldest records but quick to welcome new artists, and was also a friend to singers including Emma Eames, Lotte Lehmann, Elisabeth Schumann." Between 1951 and 1973 Shawe-Taylor wrote a quarterly retrospect for The Gramophone, under the title of "The gramophone and the voice", and also contributed to other musical publications. He was also an influential presence on the advisory committee of Historic Masters, a vinyl record label set up to produce quality 78 rpm reissues of historic recordings by famous opera singers. He was known for his championship of modern composers. His colleague David Cairns wrote of him, "The familiar repertoire came freshly alive in his hands; and when he wrote about an unfamiliar piece whether by Berio or Britten, Elliott Carter, Ligeti or Tippett he did so in a way that made you long to hear it for yourself."

Together with his partner Edward Sackville-West and another close friend, the painter, collector and art dealer Eardley Knollys, Shawe-Taylor set up home at Long Crichel House in Dorset, in 1945. Later they were joined by the literary critic Raymond Mortimer, another New Statesman colleague. They hosted salons there, entertaining some of the notable cultural figures of the period including E.M. Forster, Nancy Mitford, Benjamin Britten, Vanessa Bell and Duncan Grant. After the death of Sackville-West, Shawe-Taylor remained at Long Crichel until his death; from 1966 he was joined there by the ophthalmic surgeon and gay rights activist Patrick Trevor-Roper.

Shawe-Taylor died suddenly at Long Crichel House on 1 November 1995, aged 88, after a country walk.
