= Storran Gallery =

Former art gallery in London, England

Coordinates: 51.4994°N 0.1647°W

The Storran Gallery was a fashionable avant-garde art gallery in London in the 1930s. In 1937 it was run by the prominent art critic Eardley Knollys (a friend of Picasso) with Ala Story and the artist Frank Coombs (1906–1941). The gallery was at 106 Brompton Road London SW3 (just opposite Harrods) but moved to Fitzroy Street and then 316 Euston Road.

An unusual exhibition at the gallery in 1938 was The Jones Exhibition, in which the artists Graham Bell and Tom Harrisson curated an exhibition of London scenes by British painters all named Jones. They typed letters to invite over 800 London-based families with the widely held surname.

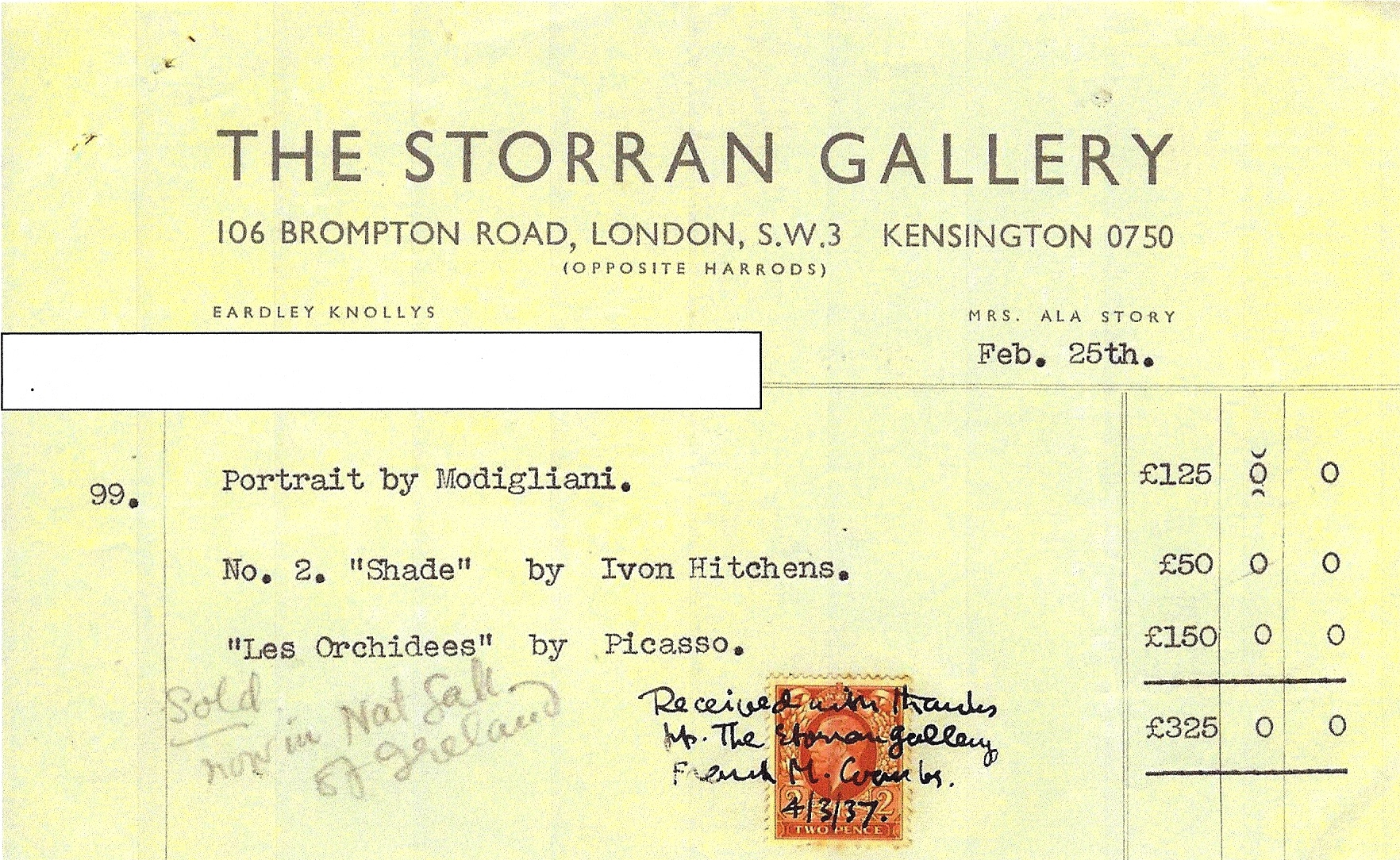
A 1937 Storran Gallery receipt for Modigliani, Hitchens and Picasso

Pictures exhibited at the Storran Gallery in the late 1930s included those by Picasso, Modigliani, Dufy, Anthony Devas, Claude Rogers, Victor Pasmore, Rupert Shephard, Graham Bell, Clare Crossley, William Coldstream, Ivon Hitchens, Jean Varda, Derek Sayer, Lynton Lamb, Joan Souter-Robinson, Ivy Langton, and Derek Latymer-Sayer. A number of these artists were members of the Euston Road School.

The sculptor Willi Soukop had his first one-man show at the Storran Gallery in 1938.
