= Michael Pitt-Rivers =

British Army officer

- Born: Michael Augustus Lane-Fox Pitt-Rivers; 27 May 1917
- Died: December 1999 (aged 82)
- Occupation: Landowner
- Known for: Being a defendant in the 1954 Montagu trial
- Criminal charge: "Conspiracy to incite certain male persons to commit serious offences with male persons"
- Criminal penalty: 18 months imprisonment
- Spouse: Sonia Brownell (m. 1958; div. 1965)
- Partner: William Gronow-Davis
- Parents: Captain George Henry Lane Fox-Pitt-Rivers; Hon. Emily Rachel Forster
- Relatives: Julian Pitt-Rivers (brother)

Major Michael Augustus Lane-Fox Pitt-Rivers (27 May 1917 – December 1999) was a British military officer and landowner who gained notoriety in Britain in the 1950s when he was put on trial charged with buggery. This trial was instrumental in bringing public attention, and opposition, to the stringent laws against homosexual acts as they then stood.

== Early life ==
Pitt-Rivers was the son of Captain George Henry Lane-Fox Pitt-Rivers and the actress Mary Hinton, who died in 1979. A West Country landowner and conservationist of colourful antecedents, his great-grandfather was Lt-Gen A.H. Lane Fox Pitt-Rivers, whose ethnographic collection, donated to Oxford University in 1883, formed the basis of the Pitt Rivers Museum named after him.

Michael Pitt-Rivers served in World War II, gaining the substantive rank of Captain in 1946.

== Prosecution ==
In the summer of 1953, Lord Montagu of Beaulieu offered his friend Peter Wildeblood the use of a beach hut near his country estate. Wildeblood brought with him two young RAF servicemen, Edward McNally and John Reynolds. The four were joined by Montagu's cousin Michael Pitt-Rivers. At the subsequent trial, the two airmen turned Queen's Evidence and claimed there had been dancing and "abandoned behaviour" at the gathering. Wildeblood said that it had in fact been "extremely dull". Montagu claimed that it was all remarkably innocent, saying: "We had some drinks, we danced, we kissed, that's all."

Arrested on 9 January 1954, in March of that year Pitt-Rivers was brought before the British courts, charged with "conspiracy to incite certain male persons to commit serious offences with male persons" or "buggery".

Pitt-Rivers, Montagu, and Wildeblood were charged. Pitt-Rivers and Lord Montagu denied the charges and also denied that they were homosexual. After an eight-day trial at the Winchester Assizes, on 24 March 1954, Pitt-Rivers and Wildeblood were sentenced to 18 months and Lord Montagu to 12 months in prison as a result of these and other charges. Their case eventually led to the Wolfenden Report, which in 1957 recommended the decriminalisation of homosexuality in the United Kingdom. It took ten years for this to happen, with the Sexual Offences Act 1967.

== Later life ==
Michael Pitt-Rivers married Sonia Brownell, the widow of George Orwell, in 1958. The couple divorced in 1965.

He spent most of his adult life with his partner, William Gronow-Davis, who inherited his estate on his death.

Pitt-Rivers spent much of his wealth on a lifetime of travel, financed by selling the most productive land from the Rushmore estate he inherited in Dorset. In 1991, he began to restore the Larmer Tree Gardens in Wiltshire, which had been neglected since his grandfather died in 1900. The gardens reopened to the public in 1995. He and Gronow-Davis collected many works of art, including sculptures by their friend Elisabeth Frink.

Michael Pitt-Rivers died in December 1999, aged 82.

The role of Pitt-Rivers in the 1967 decriminalisation of homosexuality was explored in the 2007 Channel Four docudrama A Very British Sex Scandal, and the 2017 BBC film Against The Law.

== Publications ==
- Pitt-Rivers, Michael (1966), Dorset. A Shell Guide, Faber & Faber.
