= Peter Wildeblood =

British gay rights campaigner (1923–1999)

- Wildeblood c. 1954
- Born: 19 May 1923; Alassio, Kingdom of Italy
- Died: 14 November 1999 (aged 76); Victoria, British Columbia, Canada
- Education: Radley College; Trinity College, Oxford
- Occupations: Journalist; writer; television producer
- Writing career
- Notable work: Against the Law (1955)

Peter Wildeblood (19 May 1923 – 14 November 1999) was a British-Canadian journalist, novelist, playwright and gay rights campaigner. He was one of the first men in the UK to publicly declare his homosexuality.

== Early life ==
Peter Wildeblood was born in Alassio, on the Italian Riviera, in 1923. He was the only child of Henry Seddon Wildeblood (b. 1863), a retired engineer from the Indian Public Works Department, and his second wife, Winifred Isabel, née Evans, the daughter of a sheep rancher in Argentina. He was brought up in his parents' cottage near the Ashdown Forest. His mother was considerably younger than his father, and Wildeblood wondered whether that had affected his development.

== Career ==
Wildeblood won a scholarship to Radley College and then went up to Trinity College, Oxford, in 1941, but dropped out after 10 days because of ill health. Soon afterwards, he volunteered for the Royal Air Force and trained as a pilot in Southern Rhodesia. However, after a series of crashes, he was grounded and instead became an RAF meteorologist, remaining in Southern Rhodesia for the rest of the war. After demobilisation, he resumed his place at Trinity College, where he gravitated towards a homosexual circle in the theatre and arts. He wrote a successful play, Primrose and the Peanuts.

After Oxford, Wildeblood turned to journalism, writing for the Daily Mail's regional office in Leeds, then in Fleet Street itself, first as the royal correspondent, then as its diplomatic correspondent. At this time, Wildeblood began an affair with an RAF corporal named Edward McNally and wrote him a series of passionate love letters. It was these letters which proved a crucial part of the evidence leading to Wildeblood's later conviction for conspiracy to incite acts of gross indecency.

== The Montagu trial ==
In the summer of 1952, Lord Montagu of Beaulieu had offered Wildeblood the use of a beach hut near his country estate. Wildeblood brought with him two young RAF servicemen: his lover Edward McNally, and John Reynolds. The foursome were joined by Montagu's cousin Michael Pitt-Rivers. At the subsequent trial, the two airmen turned Queen's Evidence, and claimed there had been dancing and "abandoned behaviour" at the gathering. Wildeblood said it had in fact been "extremely dull". Montagu claims that it was all remarkably innocent, saying: "We had some drinks, we danced, we kissed, that's all." Letters from Wildeblood and Montagu to McNally, a serviceman and John Reynolds were found by the RAF. They were thus offered immunity as they agreed to turn evidence against Montagu, Pitt-Rivers and Wildeblood.

The atmosphere of the 1950s regarding homosexuality was repressive; some called this period a witch-hunt. The Montagu trial followed a number of other cases in the press, including that of Soviet spies Guy Burgess and Donald Maclean, Labour MP Bill Field, writer Rupert Croft-Cooke and actor John Gielgud. It is in this context that around 1,000 men were imprisoned each year in Britain amid widespread police repression of homosexuals.

Wildeblood was arrested on 9 January 1954, and in March he was brought before the British courts charged with "conspiracy to incite certain male persons to commit serious offences with male persons" (or "buggery"). Wildeblood was charged along with Lord Montagu and Michael Pitt-Rivers, and during the course of the trial he admitted his homosexuality to the court. Montagu received a 12-month sentence, while Wildeblood and Pitt-Rivers were sentenced to 18 months in prison as a result of these and other charges. The verdict was front-page news. The verdict divided opinion and led to an inquiry resulting in the Wolfenden Report, which in 1957 recommended the decriminalisation of homosexuality in the UK.

Wildeblood's testimony to the Wolfenden committee was influential on its recommendations. The committee was set up during the prison sentence of Peter Wildeblood in order to investigate the law regarding homosexuality and to give advice and recommendations for reform if need be. Setting up the committee was made possible thanks to increased public attention about homosexuality generated by this and other cases. Peter Wildeblood thus made a great contribution to legal reform, by providing evidence and arguments for the debate in the House of Lords where the law to decriminalise homosexuality was passed in October 1965. Peter Wildeblood was the only openly gay witness to be interviewed and his book Against the Law served as a passionate account of the case and the need for reform.

== Against the Law ==
He published a book on the case, Against the Law, in 1955, an account which detailed his experiences at the hands of the law and the British establishment, brought to light the appalling conditions in HM Prison Wormwood Scrubs, and encouraged campaigns for prison reform and for reform of law regarding homosexuality. The book was a confessional autobiographical book and an early example of a 'coming out' text with Peter Wildeblood openly declaring 'I am homosexual'. Through this book Wildeblood advocated legal reform from his position of an avowedly gay man. Also Wildeblood attempts to distance the homosexual from stereotypical connotations such as indulgence and ephemera. He reframed the context of homosexual lives, laying a pathway towards not only arguing for acceptance, but also more importantly expecting equality. C. H. Rolph wrote in the New Statesman that Against the Law was "the noblest, and wittiest, and most appalling prison book of them all". To Wildeblood, "it was merely part of the story which had been implicit in me from the day when I was born".

In the book, Wildeblood suggested the prosecution of homosexuals in Britain had been encouraged by the United States, as part of a campaign to remove homosexuals from government jobs.

He wrote a second book on the subject of homosexuality the following year, propelled (according to him in the first chapter) by the strong response to Against the Law from people who contacted him directly to say how grateful they were for bringing the subject into the open.

== Later career ==
After prison, Wildeblood bought a small Soho drinking club.

Wildeblood wrote two novels, The Main Chance (1957) and West End People (1958). The latter was adapted into a successful musical, The Crooked Mile. This was the first of three musicals he worked on with Peter Greenwell, who praised Wildeblood's lyric-writing ability. It was followed by "House of Cards", and "The People's Jack" (1969).

Wildeblood became a successful television producer and writer and was involved in a number of productions, particularly for Granada Television and then the Canadian Broadcasting Corporation. He moved to Vancouver, and became a Canadian citizen in the 1980s. In 1994, he suffered a stroke which left him without the power of speech and quadriplegic. He died in Victoria, British Columbia, in 1999.

== Impact ==
His role in the decriminalisation of homosexuality in England and Wales, which occurred in 1967, was explored in the 2007 Channel Four docudrama A Very British Sex Scandal, and the 2017 BBC docudrama Against The Law, based on his book.

== Books ==
- Against the Law (1955)
- A Way of Life (1956)
- The Main Chance (1957)
- West End People (1958)
