= Ala Story =

Curator

- Born: Emilie Anna Maria Heyszl von Heyszenau; 1907; Vienna, Austria-Hungary
- Died: 1972 (aged 64–65); Santa Barbara, California, U.S.
- Education: Academy of Fine Arts Vienna
- Occupation(s): Gallerist, curator
- Partner: Margaret Mallory
- Awards: Honorary Master of Fine Arts from the University of California, Santa Barbara (1968)

Ala Story (born April 25, 1907, Vienna, Austria-Hungary; d. April 2, 1972, Santa Barbara, California) born Emilie Anna Maria Heyszl von Heyszenau, was a gallerist and curator, as well as the director of the American British Art Center in New York and the Santa Barbara Museum of Art (1952–57). She was the daughter of an Austrian colonel and cavalry commandant, W. von Heyszenau, and traced her lineage on her mother's side back to a 12th-century minnesanger, Hoffman van der Aue.

== Career ==
She trained as an artist at the Academy of Fine Arts in Vienna but in 1928, upon seeing a van Gogh show, realized she did not have the talent to be a painter. She moved to London in her twenties and worked at the Beaux Arts Gallery in Mayfair. Over the next decade, Story worked at several other London galleries, including the Redfern Gallery; Lucy Wertheim Gallery, where she was director; and the Storran Gallery near the Royal Academy, in which she was a partner. After her marriage to Neville Edward Oswald Story, son of Admiral William Story, in 1930—likely a marriage of convenience to make emigrating to Britain easier — she returned to Redfern Gallery as a director in 1936, and then took over the Stafford Gallery in St. James's, which she transformed into the British Art Centre, a non-profit dedicated to purchasing contemporary art for museums.

=== Emigration to the United States ===
In 1940, after the onset of World War II, Story moved to New York and established the American British Art Center, which was dedicated to supporting British artists. In 1944, the Center became one of two exclusive representatives for American folk artist Grandma Moses. The center was reopened in 1949 in a bookshop. Story spent some summers in the late 1940s and the 1950s in Great Barrington, Massachusetts, where she organized some local shows, including one of Grandma Moses, and was close friends with Erica Anderson, director of the Albert Schweitzer Friendship House. During the 1940s Story became known for "her quest for talent and her energy and enthusiasm in circulating exhibits of outstanding art works" in American museums. She also used the platform provided by the American British Art Center to highlight social issues, organizing "the first art auction for the benefit of the NAACP" and "several group exhibitions of paintings by members of Local 22 Dressmaker's Union."

In 1952 Story was appointed the second director of the Santa Barbara Museum of Art. Story substantially expanded the museum's collections of European and Asian art and created the Pacific Coast Biennial, to which she invited rising stars in West Coast art such as Richard Diebenkorn. The museum presented over 50 exhibitions a year during her tenure. In September 1956, the Santa Barbara News-Press reported that Story was one of 56 Santa Barbara locals to become naturalized American citizens.

Story left the museum in 1957, due to "an accumulation of fatigue." Upon her retirement, the museum established the Ala Story Fund in her honor. She began serving as consultant to the University of California, Santa Barbara art galleries in 1963 and donated more than 50 prints from the 16th through 18th centuries to their study collection. She was awarded an honorary Master of Fine Arts from the university in 1968. Story organized exhibitions for both the SBMA and UC Santa Barbara after her retirement, including a Hans Burkhardt retrospective and a comprehensive exhibition of the work of William Merritt Chase.

== Personal life ==
Story lived with her partner, Margaret Mallory, in New York and later in Montecito. Mallory's family was in the shipping business, and her great-great-grandfather founded the Mallory Steamship Company. In 1947 she partnered with Mallory to produce art films on subjects such as Henry Moore, French tapestries, and Grandma Moses, the last of which was nominated for an Academy Award for Two-Reel Short Film in 1950. Their production company was called Falcon Films. Story and Mallory were active hostesses in Santa Barbara society, with events earning multiple mentions in the Los Angeles Times. In 1964, they went on a tour of Africa together. In 1966, the Santa Barbara Museum of Art staged an exhibition of their art collections, entitled Two Collections: Margaret Mallory and Ala Story, which also traveled to the Legion of Honor in San Francisco. The couple were known collectively as "Mala" to their friends, a circle that included novelist Iris Murdoch and actress Judith Anderson. Mallory donated Story's papers from 1941–1970 to the Archives of American Art.

Story is described by art historian Burcu Dogramaci as "a protagonist of the queer scenes in London, New York and Santa Barbara and supported other emigrants of her queer networks, such as Erica Anderson (née Erika Paula Kellner)."
