= Born Free =

1966 British film by James Hill

- Theatrical release poster
- Directed by: James Hill
- Screenplay by: Gerald L.C. Copley
- Based on: Born Free by Joy Adamson
- Produced by: Sam Jaffe; Paul Radin
- Starring: Virginia McKenna; Bill Travers
- Cinematography: Kenneth Talbot
- Edited by: Don Deacon
- Music by: John Barry
- Production company: Shepperton Studios
- Distributed by: Columbia Pictures
- Release dates: 14 March 1966 (UK) (Royal Film Performance); 22 June 1966 (US)
- Running time: 95 minutes
- Country: United Kingdom
- Language: English
- Budget: $2 million
- Box office: $3.6 million (est. US/ Canada rentals)

Born Free is a 1966 British drama film starring the real-life couple Virginia McKenna and Bill Travers as Joy and George Adamson, another real-life couple, who raised Elsa the Lioness, an orphaned lion cub, to adulthood and released her into the wilderness of Kenya. The film was produced by Open Road Films Ltd. and Columbia Pictures. The screenplay, written by blacklisted Hollywood writer Lester Cole (under the pseudonym "Gerald L.C. Copley"), was based upon Joy Adamson's 1960 non-fiction book Born Free. The film was directed by James Hill and produced by Sam Jaffe and Paul Radin. Born Free, and its musical score, by John Barry, as well as the title song, with lyrics by Don Black and sung by Matt Monro, won numerous awards.

== Plot ==
In the Northern province of Kenya, British Game Warden George Adamson is forced to kill a man-eating lion and his lioness. He realises too late that the lioness was charging in defence of her three cubs and so, realising the cubs are now motherless, brings them home so he and his wife Joy can raise them. They name the cubs Big One, Lustika and Elsa. When the cubs become too old, Big One and Lustika are sent off to Rotterdam Zoo whilst George and Joy keep Elsa, having become especially attached to her.

Years later, George's boss, John Kendall, informs him that a lion in Kiunga has been killing goats in a local village. George is sent to kill the lion, which he does successfully, allowing him and Joy to enjoy a holiday with Elsa near the Indian Ocean. When they return to the Northern Province, the Adamsons learn that Elsa has caused a massive elephant stampede. John says that they can no longer keep Elsa and must find a zoo. However, Joy instead wishes to set Elsa free, believing a zoo would make her miserable. John reluctantly agrees to give the Adamsons three months to do so.

The Adamsons bring Elsa to the Meru National Park to begin her rehabilitation. They start off by trying to introduce her to a wild lion along with a kill. This does not go to plan as they return the next day only to find Elsa all alone. Elsa continually fails to make a kill, being attacked by a warthog during one attempt. Eventually, the Adamsons decide to leave Elsa for a week in the bush to encourage her to become more independent. However, they find her severely injured, possibly by wild lions. George now believes Elsa cannot survive so she must be sent to a zoo, which Joy opposes, wanting Elsa to have her freedom. This proves to be a good decision because Elsa eventually leaves for days at a time, making several kills by herself. When she comes into season, she is taken out for her final test: joining a wild pride. Despite initially being attacked, Elsa is accepted into a pride much to Joy and George's relief.

A year later, the Adamsons return to Kenya in search of Elsa. They are delighted to discover that she has thrived as a wild lion and is now a mother to three cubs. However, Joy and George decide to let the cubs remain wild instead of hand-rearing them as they did with Elsa and her sisters.

== Cast ==
- Virginia McKenna as Joy Adamson
- Bill Travers as George Adamson
- Geoffrey Keen as John Kendall
- Peter Lukoye as Nuru
- Omar Chambati as Makkede
- Surya Patel as the Doctor
- Geoffrey Best as Watson, a big game hunter
- Bill Godden as Sam

The film's credits list lions and lionesses Boy, Girl, Henrietta, Mara, Ugas, and "the Cubs".

== Production ==
The film reunited the real-life couple Bill Travers and Virginia McKenna as a couple first seen together in The Smallest Show on Earth in 1957.

George Adamson served as chief technical advisor on the film and discusses his involvement in his first autobiography, Bwana Game (UK title, 1968), known in the US as A Lifetime with Lions. According to Ben Mankiewicz, who introduces the film on Turner Classic Movies, the production unit mainly used wild lions.

The making of the film was a life-changing experience for actors Virginia McKenna and her husband Bill Travers, who became animal rights activists and were instrumental in creating the Born Free Foundation.

Although animal security staff were present during filming, a lion called Boy once knocked Virginia McKenna flat, breaking her ankle, while another lion named Girl bit McKenna's shoulder.

One of the lions in the film was played by a former mascot of the Scots Guards, who had to leave him behind when they left Kenya. The producers also acknowledged the help received from Emperor Haile Selassie of Ethiopia and the Game Department of Uganda.

== Release ==
The film premiered as the Royal Film Performance on 14 March 1966 at the Odeon Leicester Square with Winnie the Pooh and the Honey Tree as the second feature.

== Critical response and box-office ==
Born Free received critical acclaim. Review aggregator Rotten Tomatoes reports that 88% of 17 film critics have given the film a positive review, with a rating average of 7.1 out of 10.

The Times of London's film critic found the lions delightful but felt the scenes involving the humans lacked a sufficient story and that Hill "must bear some of the blame for the embarrassment provided by the humans to the fore."

Vincent Canby waxed enthusiastic about the film, writing in The New York Times, "Almost from the opening shot – a vast expanse of corn-coloured African plain where lions feed on the carcass of a freshly killed zebra – one knows that Joy Adamson's best-selling book Born Free has been entrusted to honest, intelligent filmmakers. Without minimising the facts of animal life or overly sentimentalising them, this film casts an enchantment that is just about irresistible."

The film was one of the most popular movies at the box office in Britain during 1966.

== Accolades ==
Award	Category	Nominee(s)	Result	Ref.
Academy Awards	Best Original Music Score	John Barry	Won	
Academy Awards	Best Song	"Born Free"; Music by John Barry; Lyrics by Don Black	Won	
Directors Guild of America Awards	Outstanding Directorial Achievement in Motion Pictures	James Hill	Nominated	
Genesis Awards	Classic Film Award		Won	
Golden Globe Awards	Best Motion Picture – Drama		Nominated	
Golden Globe Awards	Best Actress in a Motion Picture – Drama	Virginia McKenna	Nominated	
Golden Globe Awards	Best Original Song – Motion Picture	"Born Free"; Music by John Barry; Lyrics by Don Black	Nominated	
Grammy Awards	Best Original Score Written for a Motion Picture or a Television Show	John Barry	Nominated	
Laurel Awards	Sleeper of the Year		Won	
Laurel Awards	Top Female Dramatic Performance	Virginia McKenna	5th Place	
Laurel Awards	Top Song	"Born Free"; Music by John Barry; Lyrics by Don Black	5th Place	
National Board of Review Awards	Top Ten Films		2nd Place	

The film is recognized by American Film Institute in these lists:

- 2004: AFI's 100 Years...100 Songs:
  - "Born Free" – Nominated
- 2005: AFI's 100 Years of Film Scores – Nominated

== Sequels and spinoffs ==
The book Born Free (1960) was followed by two other books, Living Free (1961) and Forever Free (1963). A film sequel titled Living Free was directed by Jack Couffer and released in 1972. While deriving its name from the second book, the film was based on the third book in the series. It starred Susan Hampshire and Nigel Davenport as Joy and George Adamson. The film was not as well-received as its predecessor.

A documentary follow-up to Born Free, titled The Lions Are Free, was directed by James Hill and Bill Travers and released in 1969. The film follows Born Free actor Bill Travers as he journeys to a remote area in Kenya to visit George Adamson, and several of Adamson's lion friends.

In 1974, a 13-episode American television series was broadcast by NBC, titled Born Free, starring Diana Muldaur and Gary Collins as Joy and George Adamson. The series was later followed by the 1996 television film Born Free: A New Adventure directed by Tommy Lee Wallace and starring Linda Purl and Chris Noth. Joy and George Adamson do not appear as the main characters in the story. It spawned a TV series in 1998, but none of the episodes aired in the U.S.

To Walk with Lions (1999), directed by Carl Schultz, depicts the last years of George Adamson's life as seen through the eyes of his assistant, Tony Fitzjohn. George is portrayed by Richard Harris, and Honor Blackman makes a brief appearance as Joy.

On 28 September 2010 BBC Four ran a number of programmes to mark the 50th anniversary of the publishing of the book Born Free. These included a new one-hour documentary entitled The Born Free Legacy. It explores the story behind the book Born Free about the lives of Joy and George Adamson with the orphaned lion cub Elsa. It then looks at the huge impact the book, and the subsequent 1966 movie, had on the growing wildlife conservation movement. It includes archive footage and clips of interviews with the Adamsons, as well as various contributions from people including Virginia McKenna, Tony Fitzjohn (George Adamson's long time assistant) and Sir David Attenborough.

On 1 February 2011 the long running BBC series Natural World broadcast episode 10 of series 29 which was entitled 'Elsa: The Lioness that Changed the World'. This episode, narrated by actor Richard Armitage, looked back at Elsa's life and legacy, and the work done by George Adamson to rehabilitate lions into the wild following the making of the Born Free film. A slightly shortened version of this episode, this time narrated by the conservationist Chris Morgan, under the title Elsa's Legacy: The Born Free Story was also shown as part of the Nature TV series, released on PBS stations in January 2011.

== See also ==
- Christian the lion
- Daktari, American TV series (1966–1969)
