= Born Free (TV series) =

- DVD cover
- Genre: Adventure drama
- Based on: Born Free by Joy Adamson
- Developed by: Carl Foreman
- Directed by: Leonard Horn; Paul Krasny; Russ Mayberry
- Starring: Gary Collins; Diana Muldaur
- Narrated by: Diana Muldaur
- Theme music composer: John Barry
- Composers: Dick DeBenedictis; Richard Shores; Harry Sukman ("A Matter of Survival")
- Country of origin: United States
- Original language: English
- No. of seasons: 1
- No. of episodes: 13

Production
- Executive producer: David Gerber
- Production location: East Africa
- Camera setup: Single-camera
- Running time: 60 minutes
- Production companies: David Gerber Productions; Paul Radin Productions; Columbia Pictures Television

Original release
- Network: NBC
- Release: September 9 – December 30, 1974

Born Free is an American adventure drama television series based on the 1966 movie of the same name. It aired on the NBC television network from September 9 to December 30, 1974, produced by Columbia Pictures Television and starring and narrated by Diana Muldaur.

== Synopsis ==
Gary Collins stars as George Adamson and Diana Muldaur portrays Joy Adamson. The couple live in Kenya with their adopted lioness Elsa, where they protect the animals in the surrounding area from all sorts of danger, both natural and human.

An unrelated television movie called Born Free: A New Adventure was broadcast by ABC in 1996, starring Linda Purl and Chris Noth. Joy and George Adamson do not appear as the main characters in the story.

== Cast ==
=== Main ===
- Gary Collins as George Adamson
- Diana Muldaur as Joy Adamson
- Hal Frederick as Makedde
- Dawn Lyn as Reagan
- Peter Lukoye as Nuru

=== Guest stars ===
Guest stars included Peter Lawford, Barbara Parkins, Alex Cord, Susan Dey. Juliet Mills had a recurring role as Dr. Claire Hanley.

== Production ==
The series was set in Kenya and filmed in East Africa.

=== Reception and cancellation ===
Born Free was scheduled opposite ABC's Top 20 hit The Rookies and CBS's Top 30 hit Gunsmoke. Rating for the series were low and it was canceled in the middle of the 1974–75 television season after thirteen episodes.

== Episodes ==
| No. | Title | Directed by | Written by | Original release date |
|---|---|---|---|---|
| 1 | "Pilot" | Gary Nelson | Richard Fielder | September 9, 1974 |
| 2 | "Elephant Trouble" | Gary Nelson | Sy Salkowitz | September 16, 1974 |
| 3 | "A Matter of Survival" | Jack Couffer | Don Ingalls | September 23, 1974 |
| 4 | "Death of a Hunter" | Paul Radin | Nina Laemmle and Sy Salkowitz (teleplay), Nina Laemmle (story) | September 30, 1974 |
| 5 | "Africa's Child" | Leonard Horn | Hesper Anderson | October 7, 1974 |
| 6 | "The Masai Rebels" | Richard Benedict | Richard Fielder (teleplay), Nina Laemmle (story) | October 14, 1974 |
| 7 | "The Flying Doctor of Kenya" | Paul Krasny | Hesper Anderson (teleplay), Nina Laemmle (story) | October 28, 1974 |
| 8 | "The Trespassers" | Barry Crane | Richard Fielder | November 4, 1974 |
| 9 | "The Maneaters of Merti" | Paul Krasny | Nina Laemmle and Sy Salkowitz (teleplay), Carl Foreman (story) | November 11, 1974 |
| 10 | "Elsa's Odyssey" | Russell Mayberry | Richard Fielder and Nina Laemmle (teleplay), Carl Foreman and Nina Laemmle (story) | November 18, 1974 |
| 11 | "The White Rhino" | Barry Crane | Hesper Anderson | November 25, 1974 |
| 12 | "The Raiders" | Russ Mayberry | Dale Eunson | December 9, 1974 |
| 13 | "The Devil Leopard" | Gary Nelson | David Chantler | December 30, 1974 |

== DVD release ==
The complete series Born Free was released in DVD format on August 7, 2012, by Sony Pictures Home Entertainment via its "manufacture on demand" program. It was later re-released by Mill Creek on September 25, 2018.
