= Born Free: A New Adventure =

- Genre: Adventure; Drama; Family
- Based on: Characters from Born Free by Joy Adamson
- Written by: John McGreevey
- Directed by: Tommy Lee Wallace
- Starring: Jonathan Brandis; Ariana Richards; Chris Noth; Lea Moreno; Linda Purl
- Music by: David Michael Frank
- Country of origin: United States
- Original language: English

Production
- Executive producers: Jeff Franklin; Steve Waterman
- Producer: Lorin Bennett Salob
- Production locations: Lanseria, Johannesburg, South Africa
- Cinematography: Johan Scheepers
- Editor: Robert F. Shugrue
- Running time: 92 minutes
- Production companies: Franklin/Waterman 2 Entertainment; Columbia Pictures Television; Moviworld

Original release
- Network: ABC
- Release: April 27, 1996

Born Free: A New Adventure is a 1996 American television adventure film starring Jonathan Brandis and Ariana Richards. The film was written by John McGreevey and directed by Tommy Lee Wallace. It was first aired on ABC on April 27, 1996. The film was shot entirely in South Africa.

== Plot ==
Two teenagers, Rand and Val, rescue a young lioness that has been tamed by hunters. Now, they have to teach the lioness how to survive in the wild.

== Cast ==
- Jonathan Brandis as Randolph "Rand" Thompson
- Ariana Richards as Valerie "Val" Porter
- Chris Noth as Dr. David Thompson
- Lea Moreno as Gina Thompson
- Linda Purl as Eleanor Porter
- John Matshikiza as George Luello
- Pamela Nomvete as Ondine Luello
- Siyabonga Twala as Jomo
- Florence Masebe as Frances
- Wandile Molebatsi as Nik Nik
- Vicky Kente as Selena Wilkinson

== Connections ==
In 1960, Joy Adamson published a book called Born Free, based on her (and her husband, George Adamson) experience raising the lioness Elsa. The book was followed by two others, Living Free (1961) and Forever Free (1963).

== Reception ==
Carole Horst from Variety magazine wrote: "Brandis and Richards (“Jurassic Park”) make a cute couple, and Noth and Purl do their best with the thin characters given them. Director Tommy Lee Wallace does keep things going, and cinematographer Johann Scheepers’ lensing is pretty. But the South African locations could have been used more effectively, and some scenes look like they were shot on a soundstage. Footage of animals roaming around the savanna is clumsily intercut with reaction shots of the actors, creating a jarring effect." Tom Gliatto from People magazine gave the film a C− and said: "The word “adventure” is used with impudent liberality. As with its famous 1966 movie predecessor, this two-hour production involves Elsa, a tamed lioness who needs to be reeducated to survive in the wilderness, but huge chunks of the story are devoted to Jonathan Brandis (seaQuest) in the role of a sulky American teen whose widowed father is doing viral research in Africa (where the movie was shot). But this isn’t Born Free—it’s Tiger Beat."
