= Living Free =

- DVD Poster
- Directed by: Jack Couffer
- Written by: Joy Adamson (Book); Millard Kaufman (Screenplay by)
- Produced by: Paul B. Radin
- Starring: Nigel Davenport; Susan Hampshire; Geoffrey Keen; Edward Judd; Peter Lukoye
- Cinematography: Wolfgang Suschitzky
- Edited by: Don Deacon
- Music by: Sol Kaplan
- Production companies: Columbia Pictures Corporation; Columbia Pictures; Open Road Films; Highroad
- Distributed by: Columbia-Warner Distributors; Columbia Pictures; NBC
- Release date: 15 April 1972; (Japan)
- Running time: 90 minutes
- Country: United Kingdom
- Language: English

Living Free is a 1972 British drama film, written by Millard Kaufman and directed by Jack Couffer. It starred Nigel Davenport, Susan Hampshire and Geoffrey Keen. This film is a sequel to Born Free (1966), which was based on the 1960 book of the same name by Joy Adamson. The film Living Free is also based on a book by Joy Adamson; however, it is not based on the book of the same name but is instead based on the third book in the series, Forever Free. Singer Julie Budd sang the title song, composed by Sol Kaplan and Freddy Douglass.

== Plot ==
After Elsa the lioness dies, her three lion cubs (Jespah, Gopa and Little Elsa) are forced to move to a game preserve and must learn to hunt on their own with the help of George Adamson and his wife, Joy.

== Cast ==
- Nigel Davenport as George Adamson
- Susan Hampshire as Joy Adamson
- Geoffrey Keen as Kendall
- Peter Lukoye as Nuru
- Shane De Louvre as Makedde
- Robert Beaumont as Billy Collins
- Nobby Noble as Bank Manager
- Allaudin Qureshi as Bank Clerk
- Charles Hayes as Herbert Baker
- Jean Hayes as Mrs. Herbert Baker
- Edward Judd as Weaver

== Reception ==
The film was nominated for one Golden Globe Awards for Best English-Language Foreign Film.

Howard Thompson from The New York Times wrote: "'Born Free' history is repeating itself and the freshness and novelty wear thin. Still, these are enterprising, well-meaning adults, the animals—all of them — and the exotic scenery are diverting, and the picture is clean as a lion's tooth, not that we've ever crawled up close for a look. "Living Free" is close enough to sensible entertainment for the children — and bright ones, too." Andy Webb from The Movie Scene gave the film two out of five stars and stated: "What this all boils down to is that "Living Free" whilst still an entertaining movie is not a patch on "Born Free". From the change in actors, through to the overlong recap and natural history lesson it just doesn't feel right. And whilst the storyline itself relays some of the emotion of Joy and George's battle to protect Elsa's legacy the connection to the emotion never really comes across from the acting or the way the movie is directed.
