= John Michie =

Scottish actor (born 1956)

- Born: John Michie; 25 October 1956 (age 69); Burma
- Occupation: Actor
- Known for: Taggart (1998–2010); Coronation Street (2011–2013); Holby City (2013–2018, 2020–2022); Casualty (2014, 2016)
- Children: 3

John Michie (born 25 October 1956) is a Scottish television and film actor, known for his roles as DI Robbie Ross in the STV detective drama series Taggart, as Karl Munro in Coronation Street from 2011 to 2013 and his role as Guy Self in Casualty and Holby City.

== Early life ==
Michie was born in Burma and boarded at Windlesham House School while his family were based in Kenya. The family later settled in Edinburgh, and he attended the boarding school Glenalmond College from the age of twelve. At the age of nineteen, he worked his passage to Australia on a cargo ship, where he spent a year as a jackaroo herding cattle before returning to Scotland. He took a job as a stagehand at the Traverse Theatre in Edinburgh, where his interest in acting started. He returned to Kenya when he was 22, beginning his acting career in A Private Matter at the Donovan Maule Theatre, Nairobi in 1980.

== Career ==
=== Films ===
Michie's first film role was in the 1989 film The Conquest of the South Pole but his first leading role came in the film adaptation, Monk Dawson in 1998. Based on the Piers Paul Read novel, it gained a good reception from the critics despite only a short run at the UK box office. Michie played the character David Baird in John Madden's 1996 film Truth or Dare starring Helen Baxendale and John Hannah.

In 1999, Michie starred alongside Richard Harris in To Walk with Lions, a film based on the life of George Adamson which featured Michie back in his childhood home of Kenya playing the wildlife conservationist Tony Fitzjohn.

=== Television ===
In 1989, Michie appeared in series 5 of Taggart. He appeared in Moon and Son in 1992. He then had a role in The Ruth Rendell Mysteries in 1994, co-starring with Colin Firth. He played a pet shop owner, in the two-part episode "Master of the Moor".

In 1998, he was given a regular part in Taggart, playing DI Robbie Ross, a dedicated detective not afraid to go about things his own way and fly in the face of authority when he needs to.

From 2011 to 2013, Michie played Karl Munro in Coronation Street. His character was the partner of Stella Price (Michelle Collins). Since leaving Coronation Street, Michie has played a regular role in hospital drama Holby City, playing Guy Self and while continuing the role in 2014, he has also appeared in its sister show Casualty. Michie left Holby City in November 2016 after Guy handed in his resignation but he returned in August 2017. It was announced in the autumn trailer that Guy will return during the 20th series.

In 2022, Michie played Detective Chief Superintendent Jack Mulgrew in series 3 of the BBC police drama London Kills.

Michie is the voice behind Windfall Films' Big, Bigger, Biggest and Monster Moves series for Five. Big, Bigger, Biggest explores the engineering marvel of large buildings and sky scrapers, while Monster Moves documents the most daring and dangerous relocation projects ever attempted. Other voice over work has included Channel 4's The Gunpowder Plot, and six titles in the series Football Stories.

=== Presenting ===
Michie's first presenting role was for the one-hour documentary Murder Capital, which was produced by STV for The Crime & Investigation Network. During filming of Murder Capital Michie met STV producer Mick McAvoy and together they developed the idea for Michie's next series, Highlands. This six-part historical documentary series focused on the Highland Clearances of the late 18th and 19th centuries. Michie also presented STV's Made in Scotland, for which he is also executive producer. This documentary series examines the symbols of Scotland.

=== Theatre ===
Michie began his acting career on the stage and has appeared in several West End productions. Past roles include playing Arthur in Jean Anouilh's comedy, Number One, at the Queen's Theatre in 1984. He also played John in Noël Coward's play, Easy Virtue, at the Garrick Theatre in 1988–1989, before going on to play Walker in Andrew Davies' Prin at the Lyric Theatre, 1989–1990, directed by actor/director Richard Wilson. Michie was directed by Wilson twice more in Michael Wall's Women Laughing at the Royal Court Theatre and in Simply Disconnected at the Chichester Festival Theatre in 1996. He played Danny in Breed, a new play from emerging playwright Lou Ramsden, staged at Theatre503 in 2010.

Michie played Leontes in the Lyceum Theatre, Edinburgh production of Shakespeare's The Winter's Tale (2017), the fireman in the Traverse Theatre's production of Rob Drummond's The Mack (2019), and John Rebus in Ian Rankin's A Game Called Malice at the Queen's Theatre, Hornchurch in February 2023. In autumn 2023, he played Professor Rennie in the Lyceum Theatre and Pitlochry Festival Theatre production of Peter Arnott's Group Portrait in a Summer Landscape.

== Politics ==
In 2008, Michie publicly backed the Scottish Labour Party in the run up to the Glasgow East by-election. It later emerged that Michie, in a report for the BBC's This Week programme the previous year, appeared to back Scottish independence, which the Labour Party officially opposes. Michie said, "An independent Scotland would find a new confidence. It would slow down the brain-drain that causes this country to lose so many of its most brightest and most skilled." The Labour Party subsequently issued a statement on behalf of Michie claiming he did not support independence.

In August 2014, Michie was one of 200 public figures who were signatories to a letter to The Guardian opposing Scottish independence in the run-up to September's referendum on that issue.

== Personal life ==
Michie has three children with his partner Carol Fletcher, a former Hot Gossip dancer. His nephew is actor Jamie Michie, who has appeared in The IT Crowd, Game of Thrones and alongside John in Karen Pirie and one episode of Taggart in 2010.

In September 2017, his 24-year-old daughter, Louella Fletcher-Michie, died at the Bestival music festival in Dorset after taking the recreational drug 2C-P. Her 28-year-old friend, Ceon Broughton – who had videoed her over a period of six hours hallucinating and begging for help, and failed to take her to the festival hospital tent only 400 metres away – was subsequently arrested on suspicion of murder and questioned by police. In February 2019, Broughton appeared at Winchester Crown Court charged with manslaughter. On 28 February 2019, he was found guilty of manslaughter by gross negligence, as well as supplying a Class A drug, and sentenced to eight and a half years in prison. His manslaughter conviction was quashed on 18 August 2020 after Court of Appeal judges ruled that Fletcher-Michie's death was an accident, but the conviction for supplying a Class A drug stood.

== Filmography ==
=== Film ===
Year	Title	Role	Notes
1984	A Passage to India	(bit part)	Uncredited role
1988	Distant Voices, Still Lives	Soldier	
1996	Guardian Angel	Frank	Short films
1997	Daphne & Apollo	Barry The Plasterer	Short films
1998	Monk Dawson	Eddie Dawson	Lead role
1999	To Walk with Lions	Tony Fitzjohn	
2000	Being Considered	Frank	Short films
2001	Storm	Colonel Pine	Short films
2002	Puckoon	Col. Charrington Thurk	
2004	The Race	Father Pat	Short film
2023	Nessie	Jimmy	
2024	Joker: The Last Laugh	Bruce Wayne	Short film

=== Television ===
Year	Title	Role	Notes
1982	Play for Today	George	Series 12; episode 15: "The Silly Season"
1983	Storyboard	David Armstrong	Series 1; episode 6: "Lytton's Diary". Pilot for the series
1985	Bulman	Scotsman	Series 1; episode 12: "A Moveable Feast"
1985	Albion Market	Tony Fraser	Episodes 2–7
1987	Rockliffe's Babies	Bonnamy	Series 1; episode 5: "In the Bag"
1987	Casualty	PC Frank Jameson	Series 2; episodes 3 & 5: "Shades of Love" & "Anaconda"
1989	Anything More Would Be Greedy	Alistaire Midwitch	Mini-series; episodes 4 & 5
1989	Conquest of the South Pole	Roddy	Television film
1990	Taggart	Robby Meiklejohn	Series 5; episode 4: "Love Knot"
1990	Agatha Christie's Poirot	James Robinson	Series 2; episode 7: "The Adventure of the Cheap Flat"
1992	Moon and Son	Trevor Moon	Main role. Episodes 1–13
1993	Lovejoy	Jacob	Series 5; episode 7: "Stones of Destiny"
1994	The Ruth Rendell Mysteries	Nick	Series 7; episodes 1–3: "Master of the Moor: Parts 1–3"
1995	Bugs	Paul Cray	Series 1; episode 6: "Sleuth"
1996	The Vet	Jeff Hopkinson	Series 2; episode 2: "A Blind Eye"
1996	The Bare Necessities	Barry	Television film
1996	Brookside	Dr. Mark Smith	6 episodes
1996	The Bill	Gary Burns	Series 12; episode 58: "Tough Love"
1996	London Bridge	Tim Morris	Main role. Series 1; 12 episodes
1996	Screen One	David Baird	Series 8; episode 2: "Truth or Dare"
1996	Heartbeat	Hugh	Series 6; episode 17: "Charity Begins at Home"
1997–1998	EastEnders	Mr. Walker	12 episodes
1998	Dalziel and Pascoe	Andrew Goodenough	Series 3; episode 2: "Child's Play"
1998–2010	Taggart	DI Robbie Ross	Regular role. Series 15–27; 73 episodes
2001	Timewatch	Himself - Narrator	Series 20; episode 12: "Bombing Germany"
2001	Randall & Hopkirk (Deceased)	Stuart Boyle	Series 2; episode 7: "Two Can Play at That Game"
2002	Wire in the Blood	Jack Vance	Series 1; episodes 3 & 4: "Shadows Rising: Parts 1 & 2"
2010	Rab C. Nesbitt	Saunders McClure	Series 9; episode 5: "Muse"
2011–2013	Coronation Street	Karl Munro	Regular role. 299 episodes
2013–2018, 2020, 2022	Holby City	Guy Self	Regular role. Series 16–20, 22 & 23; 138 episodes
2014, 2016	Casualty	Guy Self	Recurring role. Series 28, 29 & 31; 9 episodes
2015	MegaStructures	Himself - Narrator	Episode: "Abu Dhabi Super Tunnel"
2016	West Skerra Light	Tom	Television film
2018	Long Night at Blackstone	The Laird	Television film. Sequel to West Skerra Light
2018	Our Girl	Brigadier	Series 3; episodes 7–9: "Nigeria, Belize and Bangladesh Tours: Episodes 3–5"
2020	Strike Back	Sir James Spencer	Series 8; 5 episodes: "Vendetta: Parts 1, 4, 5, 7 & 8"
2022	London Kills	DCS Jack Mulgrew	Series 3; episodes 1–4: "Grace", "Cyber Bully", "Blood" & "Control Freak"
2023	Death in Paradise	Peter Galbraith	Series 12; episode 3
2024	Ridley	Harry Bentham	Series 2; episodes 1–3 & 6–8
2025	Karen Pirie	Fergus Sinclair Snr.	Series 2; episodes 1 & 2: "A Darker Domain: Parts 1 & 2"

== Presenting ==
- Murder Capital (2007)
- Highlands (2008)
- Made in Scotland (2009)

== Voice over ==
- Black Watch (BBC Scotland) (1997)
- Hellraisers (Channel 4) (2000)
- Fire, Plague, War and Treason (Channel 4) (2001)
- Gunpowder, Treason and Plot (Channel 4) (2001)
- The Volcano That Blew a World Away (Channel 4) (2001)
- First Out of Africa (Channel 4) (2001)
- Swamp Tigers (Cicada) (2001)
- Jimmy Hill: Football's First Revolutionary (Channel 4) (2002)
- Who Got the Bay City Rollers' Millions? (Channel 4) (2004)
- Amazon Abyss (BBC) (2005)
- Football Stories (Channel 4) (2006)
- Jock Stein (BBC) (2007)
- The Loch Ness Monster Revealed (Discovery Communications) (2008)
- Big, Bigger, Biggest (Windfall) (2008–2011)
- Monster Moves (Five) (2008–2014)
- Flying Squad: The Real Sweeney (ITN Factual) (2010)
- Animal Mega Moves (National Geographic) (2010)
- London Underground Revealed (National Geographic) (2011)
- Dirty Great Machines (Channel 5) (2012)
- Machines: How They Work (Quest) (2016)
- The Glencoe Massacre (BBC Scotland)
- Kelvingrove Museum (BBC Scotland)
- Test Pilots (Creation Company Films)
- In Search of Speed (IWC)
- Althrop: After Diana & Superstar on Trial (BBC)
- Art Crimes & South Sea Bubble (Wall to Wall)
- Confessions of a Spin Doctor (STV)
- Building the Biggest Cruise Ship (National Geographic)

== Theatre ==
- Private Matter (1980) Donvan Maule Theatre, Nairobi
- Number One (1984) played Arthur at Queens Theatre
- Easy Virtue (1988–1989) played John at The Garrick Theatre
- Prin (1989–1990) played Walker at The Lyric Theatre
- Measure for Measure (1990) played The Duke in an Oxford Playhouse Production
- The Impresario from Smyrna (1994) at the Old Red Lion, London
- The Cherry Orchard (1994) National Tour
- Simply Disconnected (1996) played Greg at the Chichester Festival Theatre
- Breed (2010) played lead role of Danny at Theatre503 – nominated for an Offie
- The Winter's Tale (2017) played Leontes at the Lyceum Theatre, Edinburgh
- Peter Pan (2018) played Captain Hook at the Waterside Theatre, Aylesbury
- The Mack (2019) played the fireman at Òran Mór, Glasgow, and the Traverse Theatre, Edinburgh
- A Game Called Malice (2023) played John Rebus at the Queen's Theatre, Hornchurch
- Group Portrait in a Summer Landscape (2023) played Professor Rennie at the Pitlochry Festival Theatre and the Lyceum Theatre, Edinburgh
- House at New Grove. Directed by Martin Clunes
- Dealing with Claire at the Orange Tree, Richmond with Tom Courtenay
- Don Juan played Don Juan in an Oxford Playhouse Production
- Bent played Rudy
- Ghosts played Oswald
- The Winslow Boy played Dickie
- Dangerous Corner played Gordon
- Equus played Alan
- Black Comedy played Brindsley
- Kes played McDowall
- Richard III played Hastings
- The Russian Revolution played Trotsky at Riverside Studios
- Women Laughing at the Royal Court Upstairs
