= Kampi ya Simba =

- Location within Kenya
- Coordinates: 0.109905°S 38.761939°E
- Country: Kenya
- Province: Rift Valley Province
- Time zone: UTC+3 (EAT)

Kampi ya Simba is a settlement in Kenya's Rift Valley Province. It was home to George Adamson for many years. Kampi Ya Simba is located in Kora National Park which is where George Adamson released many of his lions.
