= Pan 70 =

Pan Books celebrates 70th anniversary with redesigned covers in classic technicolour

Pan 70 is a series of books published by Pan Books in the UK. The books were released on 7 September 2017 to celebrate the 70th anniversary of the publication of the first Pan paperback, Ten Stories by Rudyard Kipling. The books were released in A-format size, with the covers redesigned in classic technicolour.

== The books ==
Title	Author	Pages	ISBN
Born Free	Joy Adamson	464	9781509860241
The Lost World	Arthur Conan Doyle	288	9781509858491
The Provincial Lady	E. M. Delafield	320	9781509858453
Eye of the Needle	Ken Follett	480	9781509860227
The Dam Busters	Paul Brickhill	320	9781509860067
It Shouldn't Happen to a Vet	James Herriot	304	9781509860081
Ten Stories	Rudyard Kipling	288	9781509858408
The Pan Book of Horror Stories	Various	320	9781509860104
Last Bus to Woodstock	Colin Dexter	320	9781509860128
Gone with the Wind	Margaret Mitchell	1024	9781509860289
Jaws	Peter Benchley	352	9781509860166
The Time Machine	H. G. Wells	160	9781509858538
Childhood's End	Arthur C. Clarke	272	9781509838431
Dead Simple	Peter James	480	9781509860180
The Hitchhiker's Guide to the Galaxy	Douglas Adams	240	9781509860142
The Lady Vanishes	Ethel Lina White	272	9781509858514
The Thirty-Nine Steps	John Buchan	176	9781509858439
Savages	Shirley Conran	720	9781509860265
England, Their England	A. G. Macdonell	304	9781509858477
Not a Penny More, Not a Penny Less	Jeffrey Archer	352	9781509860203

== See also ==
- Penguin Essentials
