= To Walk with Lions =

- Directed by: Carl Schultz
- Written by: George Adamson (book); Sharon Buckingham; Keith Ross Leckie
- Produced by: Julie Allan; Pieter Kroonenburg; Hélène Boulay
- Starring: Richard Harris; John Michie; Ian Bannen; Kerry Fox
- Music by: Alan Reeves
- Distributed by: IAC Film and Television; Mosaic Entertainment
- Release date: 1999
- Running time: 106 minutes
- Countries: United Kingdom; Kenya; Canada
- Language: English

To Walk with Lions is a 1999 film directed by Carl Schultz and starring Richard Harris as George Adamson and John Michie as Tony Fitzjohn. It follows the later years of Lion advocate Adamson.

After his marriage to Joy Adamson of Born Free fame, Adamson spent the latter part of his life protecting the lions and other wildlife in the Kora National Reserve, Kenya. He encounters poachers and government corruption blocking his quest for wildlife preservation.

== Plot ==
Tony Fitzjohn (John Michie) has just come to work on Kora, a lion preserve, for two elderly brothers, George and Terrence Adamson (Ian Bannen). On his first day, Fitzjohn ignores George's advice not to run and is nearly mauled. Being informed this is how the last person to fill his position died, Fitzjohn writes the whole place off as crazy and decides to leave. After a last minute change of heart, and a lion cub brought in from a zoo for him to train and reintroduce into the wild, he discovers his life's true calling.

Years pass and Kora's lions are being picked off by herdsmen one by one with bullets and poison and the elephants and rhinos are being poached at an alarming rate for their tusks and horns. The Adamson brothers are expending all of their energies in protecting the wildlife but can hardly compete; as Fitzjohn observes “A ranger may make 800 shillings a month but a poacher will pay him 10,000 just to turn his back for a day”. The odds seem to be insurmountable as the poachers pile in and the animal death toll rises, while the local government decides that it does not really want a wildlife preserve at all.

== Cast ==
- Richard Harris as George Adamson
- Ian Bannen as George's brother Terrence Adamson
- John Michie as Tony Fitzjohn
- Honor Blackman as Joy Adamson
- Kerry Fox as Lucy Jackson
- Hugh Quarshie as Hugh
- Geraldine Chaplin as Victoria Anrecelli

=== Streaming ===
In November 2019 the film was released online on the Canada Media Fund's Encore+ YouTube channel.
