= Robert A. Cinader =

American television producer (1924–1982)

Robert A. Cinader (November 10, 1924 – November 16, 1982) was an American television producer best known for his work on two NBC series packaged by actor/producer Jack Webb's Mark VII Limited, Adam-12 and Emergency! The latter show, in particular, was widely credited by observers as one of the most important efforts to promote the widespread adoption of paramedic services by fire departments and hospitals in the U.S.

== Career ==
A native New Yorker and an Army veteran, Cinader first wrote for Holiday Magazine, and later became head of the United Nations' publications operation. Then he turned to the field of television syndication, working for the William Morris Agency and later for NBC's syndication division, where he created a 1957 adventure series, The Silent Service, a Dragnet-like semi-documentary anthology about Navy submarines. Afterward, he worked for both Hal Roach and Red Skelton in the early 1960s.

While working a stint at Warner Brothers, Cinader was approached by Webb (a former head of the WB TV operation) to assist him in producing his 1967–70 revival of Dragnet, for Universal Studios. While on that job, he devised a show for Mark VII that told the story of the police beat from the perspective of two LAPD patrol officers. The result, Adam-12, ran on NBC from 1968 to 1975; Cinader was also the producer of that program during the early part of its run.

In 1971, while brainstorming for new program ideas, Cinader heard about a trial paramedic program that Los Angeles County was undertaking with funding by the California State Legislature. He became so enthralled with the idea that he persuaded Webb and Universal to make an entire show about the phenomenon.

Emergency! was set in a fictional fire station, with trained firefighters attending to first aid and primary care of sick and injured victims on the scene, while electronically transmitting medical information to, and receiving instructions from, doctors and/or nurses at the fictional Rampart hospital. The show debuted as a mid-season replacement in early 1972, and despite facing the top-rated All in the Family for most of its run on Saturday nights, Emergency! managed to gain a large following among young viewers.

NBC spun off the show into a Saturday-morning cartoon series entitled Emergency +4, which lasted for two years in the mid-1970s. The prime-time show itself ran for six seasons as a weekly show and two more as a series of two-hour made-for-TV movies. Cinader eventually became its executive producer; during the 1973–74 season, he also helmed Mark VII's Chase, a similar adventure-based show. The following year, he would supervise an Emergency! spin-off of sorts, Sierra, a show that lasted only 13 weeks. He produced two 1979 miniseries The Rebels and The Seekers, as well as Condominium (1980).

Cinader became an expert in emergency medicine and in 1975 was appointed to the Emergency Medical Services Commission of Los Angeles County and he served on the commission until his death.

Just prior to his death, Cinader produced the first six episodes of Knight Rider, a new series from Glen A. Larson. He is listed in the credits as Co-Executive Producer.

== Death ==
Cinader died from cancer in Encino, California six days after his 58th birthday, just five weeks before Webb also died. Cinader was survived by his wife of 31 years, Jean. The Knight Rider episode "The Final Verdict" was dedicated to him, stating "he was an original."

== Legacy ==
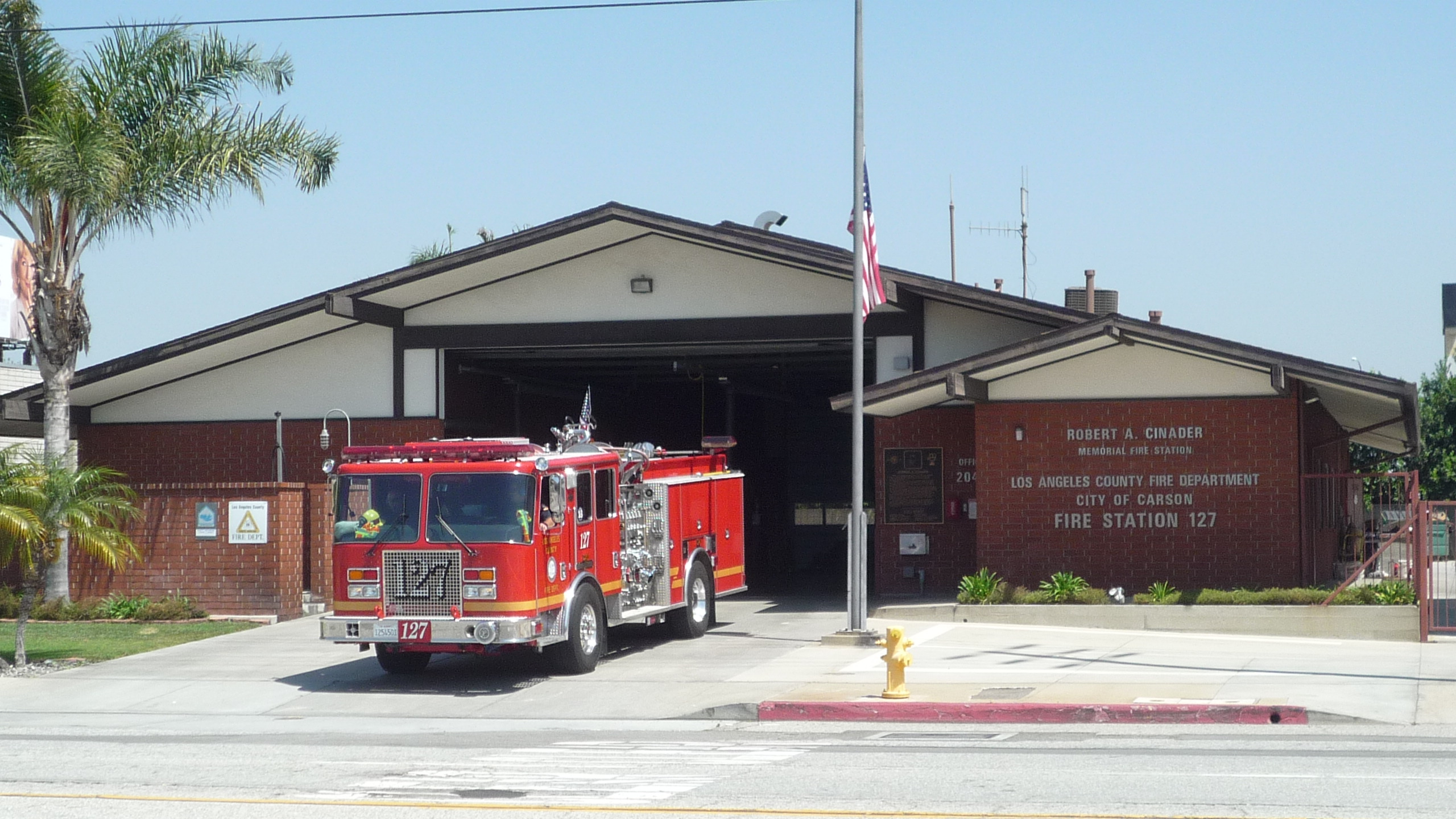
Los Angeles County Fire Department, Fire Station 127

Cinader became so identified with the paramedic movement that he received an appointment to the local Emergency Medical Services Commission. Los Angeles County Fire Department station 127 in Carson, California, shown in Emergency! as the fictional Station 51, was named as the Robert A. Cinader Memorial Fire Station in his memory.

== Selected filmography ==
- Dragnet (1967–1970) (TV series)
- Adam-12 (1968–1975) (TV series)
- Emergency! (1972–1979) (TV series)
- Sierra (1974) (TV series)
- Pine Canyon Is Burning (1977) (TV movie)
- The Immigrants (1978) (TV movie)
- The Rebels (1979) (TV movie)
- The Seekers (1979) (TV movie)
- Quincy, M.E. (1980) (TV series)
- Condominium (1980) (TV movie)
- Knight Rider (1982) (TV series)

== Sources ==
- Profile on "Emergency Fans" website
- Total Television: A Comprehensive Guide to Programming from 1948 to the Present, Alex McNeil, New York: Penguin, revised ed., 1984.
