= Highlands (TV series) =

- Genre: Factual
- Presented by: John Michie
- Country of origin: Scotland
- Original language: English

Production
- Producer: STV Studios
- Production location: Scottish Highlands
- Camera setup: Multi-camera
- Running time: 30 minutes (including adverts)

Original release
- Network: STV
- Release: 13 April – 18 May 2008

Highlands is a 6-part documentary series produced by STV Studios (then known as "SMG Productions") and broadcast on STV in Northern and Central Scotland and The History Channel (UK), presented by Taggart actor John Michie.

Highlands focused on the Highland Clearances of the late 18th & early 19th centuries and the political & religious events that led to widespread evictions which diluted the culture of area and led to mass emigration to the Lowlands, the coast and abroad.

Locations featured in the series included Culloden, Glenfinnan, Urquhart Castle, Strathcarron and Durness. The Earl of Cromartie and author/historian Jim Hunter were amongst the featured local highlanders and historians featured.

Since its original broadcast, the series has since been aired on History (UK) and released on DVD.
