= Kent McCord =

American actor (born 1942)

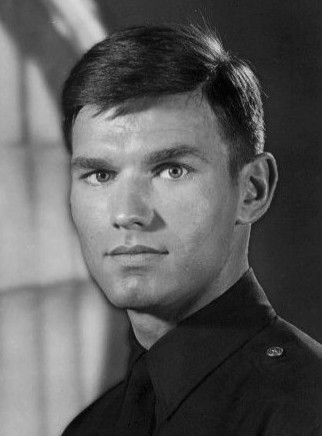
- McCord in 1970 as Jim Reed in Adam-12
- Born: Kent Franklin McWhirter; September 26, 1942 (age 84); Los Angeles, California, U.S.
- Occupation: Actor
- Years active: 1964–2005
- Spouse: Cynthia Lee Doty (m. 1962)
- Children: 3

Kent Franklin McWhirter (born September 26, 1942), known by his stage name Kent McCord, is an American retired actor, best known for his roles as Officer Jim Reed on the television series Adam-12, Captain "Boxey" Troy on Galactica 1980, and IASA Colonel John Robert "Jack" Crichton / "Jack" the Ancient on Farscape.

== Life and career ==
McCord was born in Los Angeles, California to Bert and Laura McWhirter. First using his real name on television in 1962 in The Adventures of Ozzie & Harriet, he later adopted his stage name. He became a close friend of Rick Nelson and made 44 appearances on the program. He also landed small parts in five Elvis Presley films and (as Kent McWhirter) portrayed a motorcycle courier in McHale's Navy in the episode "Monkey Business 007". McCord also appeared in the first episode (September 14, 1967) of Raymond Burr's Ironside series, titled "Message from Beyond", as motorcycle cop Kellogg.

In the first season of Jack Webb's Dragnet 1967, he appeared three times. The first appearance was an extra as a patrol officer in the episode "The Big Explosion". He was credited under his legal name. In the third episode, "The Interrogation", McCord was credited under his stage name in the role of a police officer who has been accused of robbing a store while working an undercover narcotics detail fresh out of the police academy. McCord went on to appear five additional times in the second season, three times as unnamed officers and twice as his eventual Adam-12 character Jim Reed. He appeared once more on Dragnet as Reed before the character became exclusive to Adam-12.

McCord's big break came in 1968 when he was given a lead role next to Martin Milner as rookie police officer James A. "Jim" Reed on Adam-12, a police drama television series created by Jack Webb. The show ran on NBC from 1968 to 1975.

McCord was elected to the national board of directors of the Screen Actors Guild in 1972 and was on the board for 11 years. He was the first national vice president while on the National Board of Directors.

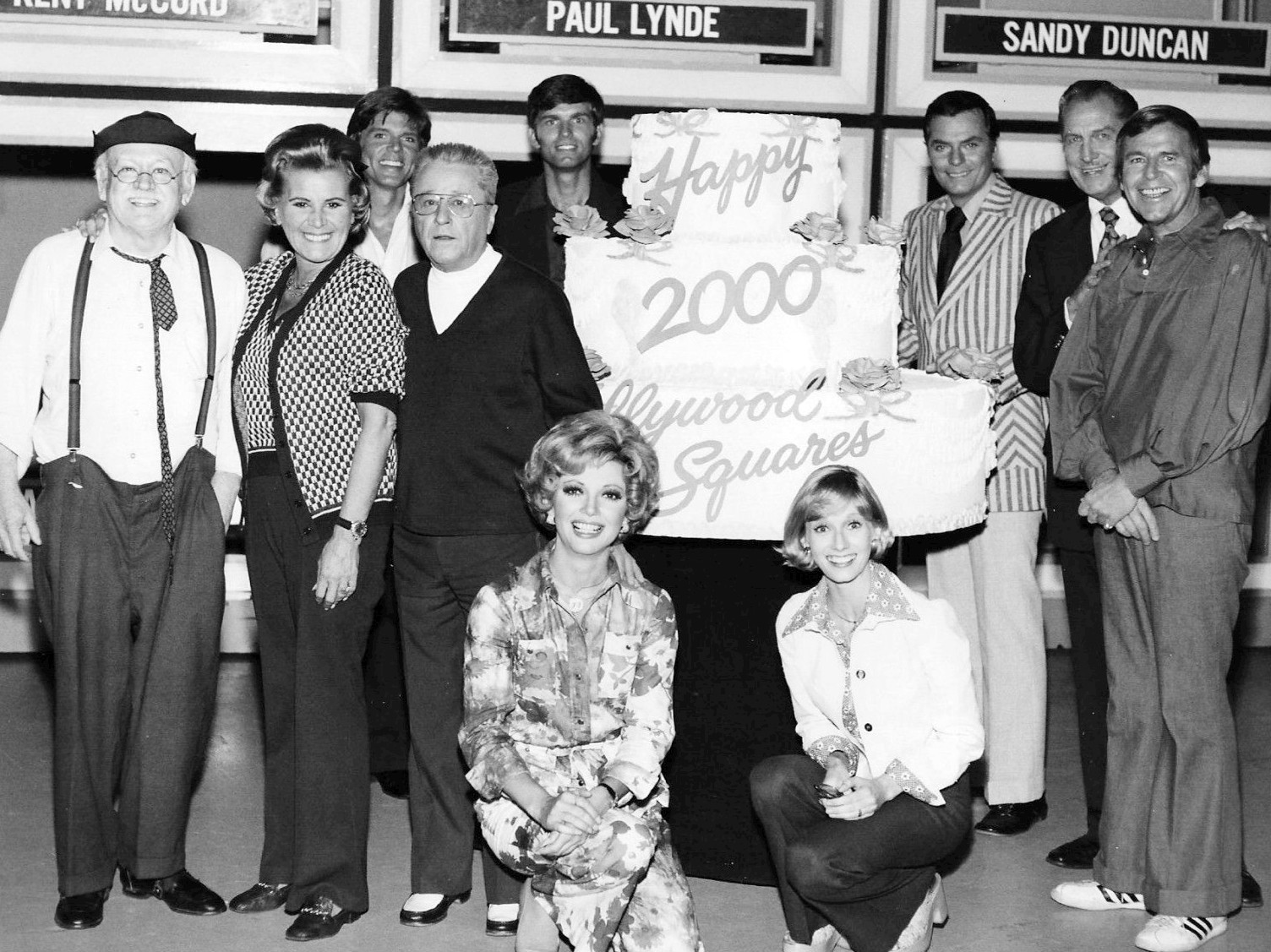
Photo from the television game show Hollywood Squares to celebrate the 2,000th episode in 1974. Pictured are Cliff Arquette as Charley Weaver, Rose Marie, John Davidson, George Gobel, McCord, Peter Marshall, Vincent Price, Paul Lynde; Ruta Lee and Sandy Duncan, foreground.

McCord appeared as a downed fighter ace on the 1970s series Baa Baa Black Sheep. In 1980, he played Troy on the television series Galactica 1980. Two years later, Webb tapped him and former co-star Martin Milner for a new Dragnet series he was preparing, with McCord and Milner to reprise their characters from Adam-12, now promoted to detectives. Webb died in December 1982, however, before any of the episodes he wrote could be produced. In 1982, McCord played Mr. Unger on Airplane II: The Sequel. In 1989, he co-starred on the crime drama Unsub.

McCord re-teamed with Martin Milner in the cable TV-movie Nashville Beat (1990), originally shown on The Nashville Network. The story was co-written by McCord, who played an LAPD detective who works with his former partner, played by Milner, in Nashville, Tennessee.

In 1990, McCord appeared in the film Predator 2 as Captain Pilgrim. Three years later he played John Reynolds in Return of the Living Dead 3 (1993).

From 1994 to 1995, McCord played the recurring role of Scott Keller on seaQuest DSV. He appeared in three episodes of JAG, and teamed with Martin Milner again in the Diagnosis: Murder episode "Murder Blues." More recently, McCord became a semi-regular guest star on Farscape, where he played two versions (one human and one alien appearing in the physical form of the human) of the same character, Jack Crichton from 1999 to 2003, appearing in all four seasons. He played Deputy U.S. Marshal Jack Hendricks on the series Renegade.

== Filmography ==
Film
Year	Title	Role	Notes
1964	Seven Days in May	Presidential Aide	Uncredited
1964	Kissin' Cousins	Extra	Uncredited
1964	Viva Las Vegas	Casino Patron	Uncredited
1964	The Americanization of Emily	Soldier	Uncredited
1964	Roustabout	Carnival Worker	Uncredited
1964	The Disorderly Orderly	Hospital Intern in Pre-Credits Sequence	Uncredited
1965	John Goldfarb, Please Come Home!	Football Player	Uncredited
1965	Girl Happy		Uncredited
1965	Billie	Student in Bleachers	Uncredited
1965	The War Lord	Extra	Uncredited
1966	Frankie and Johnny	Man in audience	Uncredited
1967	The Young Warriors	Lieutenant	
1967	The Outsider	Officer Dutton	
1968	Jigsaw		
1968	Shadow Over Elveron	Jessie's Boyfriend (as Kent McWhirter)	
1968	Did You Hear the One About the Traveling Saleslady?		
1969	Dragnet 1966	Brewster – Desk Clerk (uncredited)	
1970	Breakout	Hunter	
1973	Beg, Borrow ... or Steal	Lester Yates	ABC Movie of the Week
1974-2004	Hollywood Squares	self - panelist	5 episodes
1977	Telethon	Tom Galvin	
1977	Pine Canyon Is Burning	Capt. William Stone, patrol 99	
1979	Heaven Only Knows		
1980	Conquest of the Earth	Capt. Troy (archive footage)	
1982	Airplane II: The Sequel	Unger	
1989	Nashville Beat	Lieutenant Mike Delaney	
1990	Predator 2	Captain Brent Pilgrim	
1991	Out for Justice	Jack	
1992	Illicit Behavior	Dr. Halperin	
1993	Return of the Living Dead Part III	Colonel John Reynolds	
1994	Accidental Meeting	Jack Parris	
1995	With Criminal Intent		
1997	Doomsday Rock		
2000	Woman's Story	Buckley Warner	
2001	Megiddo: The Omega Code 2		
2002	Run Ronnie Run!	Rescue Show Announcer	
2005	Phantom Below	Vice Admiral Sommerville	

=== Television ===
Year	Title	Role	Notes
1961–1965	The Adventures of Ozzie and Harriet	Kent	
1966	McHale's Navy	The Courier (as Kent McWhirter)	Episode: Secret Chimp 007
1966	Pistols 'n' Petticoats	Cousin Fred (as Kent McWhirter)	Episode: Bitter Blossom O'Brian
1966	The Virginian (TV series)	Hotel Clerk (as Kent McWhirter)	Episode: A Bald-Faced Boy
1966–1967	Run for Your Life	Mike Ramsey	2 episodes
1967	Ironside (1967 TV series)	Patrolman Kellogg	Episode: Message from Beyond
1967	Dragnet (1967 TV series)	Officer (as Kent McWhirter)	3 episodes
1968	The Outsider (TV Series)	Bill Elison	Episode: The Land of the Fox
1968–1975	Adam-12	Officer James A. "Jim" Reed	174 episodes
1970	The Tonight Show Starring Johnny Carson	self	Episode: September 28, 1970
1970	The Merv Griffin Show	self	Episode: December 23, 1970
1971	The D.A. (1971 TV series)	Officer James A. "Jim" Reed	Episode: The People vs. Saydo
1972	Emergency!	Officer James A. "Jim" Reed	Episode: The Wedsworth-Townsend Act
1972	The Merv Griffin Show	self	Episode: October 18, 1972
1972–1973	Rowan & Martin's Laugh-In		3 episodes
1976	Baa Baa Black Sheep (TV series)	Captain Charles W. Dobson	Episode: Presumed Dead
1980	Galactica 1980	Captain Troy	10 episodes
1980	The Love Boat	Howard Samuels	Episode: The Captain's Ne'er-Do-Well Brother/The Perfect Match/The Remake
1981	An Ozzie and Harriet Christmas	Self	TV special on KTLA in Los Angeles
1987	J.J. Starbuck	Martin	Episode: Incident at Sam September
1988	The Highwayman (TV series)		Episode: Road Lord
1988	21 Jump Street	Tom Hanson Sr.	Episode: Chapel of Love
1989	Monsters (American TV series)	Tom Solo	Episode: Rain Dance
1989	UNSUB (TV series)	Alan McWhirter	8 episodes
1990	MacGyver (1985 TV series)	Novis Riley	Episode: Squeeze Play
1991	Murder, She Wrote	George Harris	Episode: The Taxman Cometh
1992–1997	Renegade (TV series)	Deputy U.S. Marshal Jack Hendricks	
1994-1995	SeaQuest DSV	Commander Scott Keller	5 episodes
1996–1998	Silk Stalkings	D.A. Craig Alexander	5 episodes
1997	Diagnosis: Murder	Detective Tony Stang	Episode: "Murder Blues"
1997	Dark Skies	Dick Loengard	Episode: The Enemy Within
1997	Pacific Blue (TV series)	Brolin Jorgenson	Episode: Ties That Bind
1997	Mike Hammer, Private Eye	Anthony Ropa (uncredited)	Episode: A Penny Saved
1998	JAG (TV series)	Rear Admiral Paul Whelan	Episode: With Intent to Die
1999	Beyond Belief: Fact or Fiction	General Henry Lee	Episode: The Burial
1999–2003	Farscape	IASA Colonel John Robert "Jack" Crichton - "Jack" the Ancient	7 episodes – 4 episodes
2000	JAG (TV series)	Capt. Henry Delario	Episode: Drop Zone
2004	Hollywood Squares	Himself	Episode: February 25, 2004
