= Tony Fitzjohn =

British conservationist (1945–2022)

Anthony Raymond Fitzjohn OBE
- Born: 7 July 1945
- Died: 23 May 2022 (aged 76)
- Known for: Field director, George Adamson Wildlife Preservation Trusts
- Spouse: Lucy Mellotte (m. 1997)
- Children: 4
- Scientific career
- Fields: Conservationist

Anthony Raymond Fitzjohn, OBE (7 July 1945 – 23 May 2022) was a British conservationist who worked extensively with George Adamson at Kora in Africa. In recognition of his service to wildlife conservation, Fitzjohn was appointed an Officer of the Order of the British Empire in 2006.

== Biography ==
Fitzjohn was born on 7 July 1945 and was adopted as an infant by Hilda and Leslie Fitzjohn. He was raised in Cockfosters, a suburb of North London, and was educated at Mill Hill School, a boarding school also in North London. After a brief career with Express Dairies, he left for South Africa in 1968 and then for Kenya, where he worked at an outdoor pursuits centre near Mount Kilimanjaro. In 1971, he found work with the conservationist George Adamson, remaining with him for 18 years at the Adamson's camp in the Kora National Reserve, managing the camp and reintroducing big cats into the wild. After Adamson's death in 1989, Fitzjohn moved to Tanzania to manage the Mkomazi Game Reserve. He married Lucy Mellotte in 1997, with whom he had four children, and was appointed an Officer of the Order of the British Empire in 2006 in recognition of his service to wildlife conservation. In 2019, he returned to the Kora National Reserve in Kenya. He died of cancer on 23 May 2022, at the age of 76.

== Awards ==
2016 – Hanno R. Ellenbogen Citizenship Award presented jointly by the Prague Society for International Cooperation and Global Panel Foundation.

== Films ==
The Leopards of Kora
A wildlife documentary taped in 1982. It was produced by Americans Gary Streiker and videographer Mark Roberts and was presented on BBC in 1992, about the release of two leopards into the Kora Preserve in the mid-1980s. The documentary was also presented on the Discovery Channel prior to that.
Born to be Wild
A BBC documentary released in 1999, about the translocation of the elephant, Nina, to the Mkomazi Game Reserve after 27 years in captivity.
Mkomazi: Return of the Rhino
Produced by Henson International Television with music by Nikolas Labrinakos this documentary follows the capture in South Africa of four black rhinos and their journey back to their original homeland of Mkomazi in Tanzania.
To Walk with Lions
This 1999 film is the dramatic continuation of George Adamson's (Richard Harris) fight to save Kenya's wildlife. Together with his young assistant Tony Fitzjohn (John Michie), Adamson battles to keep the animals on his game reserve Kora from dangerous poachers and deadly shifta bandits.
