= Elsa the lioness =

Female lion bred in captivity

Elsa

Elsa the lioness (c. 28 January 1956 – 24 January 1961) was a female lion raised, along with her sisters Big One and Lustica, by game warden George Adamson and his wife, naturalist and author Joy Adamson, after the cubs were orphaned at a few days old. Though her two sisters eventually went to the Netherlands' Rotterdam Zoo, Elsa was trained by the Adamsons to survive on her own and was eventually released into the wild.

Her story is told in several books by the Adamsons, as well as the 1966 film Born Free.

== Life ==
Elsa and her sisters were orphaned on 1 February 1956, after George Adamson killed their mother in self-defence when she charged at him. George later realised the lioness had acted aggressively to defend her three cubs. George and Joy then adopted the lioness's four-day-old cubs.

While Elsa lived in many ways like a domesticated pet when she was small, Joy Adamson, whom Elsa trusted the most, considered her relationship with Elsa to be that of equals. After sending the other two cubs to Rotterdam Zoo, Joy helped Elsa develop the skills necessary to survive independently. Elsa's story gained international attention following the publication of Joy's book Born Free.

When Elsa was three years old, she brought three of her cubs to the Adamsons. The couple named the males Jespah and Gopa, and named the female Little Elsa. The life of Elsa and her cubs is covered in Joy's 1961 book Living Free: The Story of Elsa and Her Cubs, which was made into the film of the same name.

Over time there was growing opposition to Elsa and the Adamsons; eventually they were told they had to relocate her and her cubs. However, before long Elsa became ill and died of a form of babesiosis, a tick-borne blood disease similar to malaria which often infects the cat family. Elsa's grave is in the Meru National Park. After Elsa's death, the cubs were still only just over a year old and the Adamsons knew they were still too young to be able to hunt for themselves. They continued to provide goats for the cubs. At one point, the cubs disappeared for several weeks and were found to have been attacking goats belonging to local tribesmen. On one such raid by the cubs, Jespah was hit by an arrow which fortunately was not tipped with poison. The Adamsons knew they had to find somewhere to relocate the cubs or they would almost certainly be killed.

Eventually they were given permission to move the cubs to the Serengeti National Park. After their release, the Adamsons were initially allowed to continue to camp close to the release point to monitor the cubs, while providing them with food to help them until they could reliably hunt for themselves. However, the park authorities eventually decided it was time to leave the cubs to fend for themselves. There were concerns about the safety of park tourists being around lions which were familiar with humans. As a result, the Adamsons were told to leave. The Adamsons believed the cubs would most likely starve and needed more time to develop their hunting skills. Despite these concerns, the park authorities would not grant permission so the Adamsons were forced to break camp.

Joy Adamson then decided to pay for her and George to be allowed to stay on as regular park tourists. As such, they had to stay at the designated tourist accommodation. They were required to drive out each day to find the cubs; this became increasingly difficult. After many days of searching, they finally managed to find the cubs again and spent the next few days with them. Jespah still had the arrowhead in his side, so the Adamsons made plans to bring along a vet and make another attempt to remove it. However, when they returned, they once again could not find the cubs and it proved to be the last time they ever saw the cubs together. George Adamson was able to find Little Elsa, healthy and in the company of two other unrelated lions, during 19 months of subsequent searching. This was the last time that the Adamsons saw any of Elsa's cubs.

== Books ==
- Born Free 1960 – Written by Joy Adamson; Library of Congress Catalog Card No. 60-6792
- Living Free 1961 – Written by Joy Adamson; Library of Congress Catalog Card No. 61-15810
- Forever Free 1962 – Written by Joy Adamson; Library of Congress Catalog Card No. 63-8081
- Bwana Game (UK Title) 1968, A Lifetime With Lions (USA Title) 1970 – Written by George Adamson
- My Pride and Joy 1986 – Written by George Adamson – ISNS 978-0-00-272518-7 0 00 272518 5.

== Films ==
- Elsa the Lioness (1961), 29 minutes; BBC documentary produced, hosted and narrated by David Attenborough. Filmed just before Elsa's death, it follows Joy and George Adamson as they search for Elsa (who has been wounded in a fight with another lioness) and her three cubs. It shows remarkable footage of Meru National Park and its wildlife. Joy Adamson recounts the visit of Attenborough and his cameraman, Geoff Mulligan, in her book Living Free.
- Born Free (1966), 95 minutes; starring Bill Travers and Virginia McKenna – George Adamson was the technical advisor. Directed by James Hill. Academy Award winner and Golden Globe Award winner.
- Living Free (1972), starring Susan Hampshire and Nigel Davenport, based not on the book by the same name, but on the third book of the series, Forever Free.
- Elsa and Her Cubs, 25 minutes; Film footage of Elsa and her cubs Jespah, Gopa, and Little Elsa. It includes Joy and George Adamson. Although the film begins by saying the narrator is George Adamson, it is not George Adamson speaking.

== Television ==
- A documentary follow-up to Born Free, titled The Lions Are Free, was directed by James Hill and Bill Travers and released in 1969. The film follows Born Free actor Bill Travers as he journeys to a remote area in Kenya to visit George Adamson, and several of Adamson's lion friends.
- Born Free (1974), television series based on the film, starring Gary Collins and Diana Muldaur.
- The Born Free Legacy (2010); Documentary marking the 50th anniversary of Joy Adamson's book Born Free.
- Elsa: The Lioness that Changed the World (2011); Shown in the US under the title Elsa's Legacy: The Born Free Story. Also to celebrate the 50 year anniversary of the book, a further documentary was produced which was a collaboration between BBC in the UK for their series Natural World and PBS for their series Nature. It uses extensive archive footage shot by the Adamsons themselves during their time with Elsa and commentary voiced by an actor taken from the writings of George Adamson. It also features contributions from Virginia McKenna, Tony Fitzjohn and Sir David Attenborough.

== See also ==
- Christian the lion
