= Jean Lisette Aroeste =

American screenwriter (1932–2020)

Jean Lisette Aroeste (2 October 1932 – August 2020) was an American screenwriter. A librarian at the University of California, Los Angeles, she was a Star Trek fan who became one of four writers with no prior television writing credits (David Gerrold, Judy Burns and Joyce Muskat were the other three) to sell scripts to the program.

== Career ==
Her first sale, "Is There in Truth No Beauty?", was an unsolicited script which Star Trek co-producer Robert H. Justman read and recommended to Gene Roddenberry. She then sold the story "A Handful of Dust", which was eventually produced as "All Our Yesterdays" – the second-to-last episode of the original Star Trek series. These two episodes were her only television sales.

Aroeste had previously been an acquisitions librarian at the Harvard University Library; after UCLA, she subsequently was head of References and Collection Development at the Princeton University Library.

Aroeste died in August 2020, at the age of 87.

== Family ==
Jean Lisette Aroeste was born Jean Lisette Buck, the daughter of Charles Buck (1900–1974) and Katherine Buck (née Graham, 1902–1990). She married Henry Aroeste (1927–1995) in 1967, and they divorced in 1978.
