= Return to Tomorrow =

- Star Trek: The Original Series episode
- Episode no.: Season 2 Episode 20
- Directed by: Ralph Senensky
- Written by: John T. Dugan
- Cinematography by: Jerry Finnerman
- Production code: 051
- Original air date: February 9, 1968

Guest appearances
- Diana Muldaur – Lt. Cmdr/Dr. Ann Mulhall; Cindy Lou – Nurse; Frank da Vinci – Lt. Brent; Eddie Paskey – Lt. Leslie; William Blackburn – Lt. Hadley / Android; Roger Holloway – Lt. Lemli; James Doohan – Sargon (voice)

Episode chronology
| ← Previous "A Private Little War" | Next → "Patterns of Force" |
- Star Trek: The Original Series season 2

"Return to Tomorrow" is the twentieth episode of the second season of the American science fiction television series Star Trek. Written by John T. Dugan (under the pen-name "John Kingsbridge") and directed by Ralph Senensky, it was first broadcast February 9, 1968.

In the episode, telepathic aliens take control of Captain Kirk, Dr. Ann Mulhall (Diana Muldaur), and First Officer Spock's bodies in order to construct android hosts.

This episode was the first appearance of Diana Muldaur in the Star Trek franchise. She appeared again as Dr. Miranda Jones in the third season episode, "Is There in Truth No Beauty?" and as Dr. Katherine Pulaski in the second season of Star Trek: The Next Generation.

== Plot ==
The starship Enterprise receives a distress call from an apparently lifeless planet. Upon arrival, a telepathic being named Sargon (voiced by James Doohan) addresses Kirk and Spock as his "children", and invites them to beam down to the planet. Kirk, Spock, Dr. McCoy, and Lt. Cmdr. Ann Mulhall beam to a subterranean vault where the voice of Sargon greets them from a luminous sphere on a pedestal.

Sargon explains that he and two others are the last survivors of their race; their minds, stored in these spheres, have existed here since their planet was devastated by war. Sargon then transfers his mind into Kirk's body and Kirk's mind into the sphere. Sargon explains that he and his companions will need human bodies temporarily, in order to construct android hosts for themselves, and then returns to his orb. Kirk, returned to his own body, declares his confidence in Sargon.

Back onboard the Enterprise, the four meet with Chief Engineer Scott to consider Sargon's request, and Kirk convinces the others with a rousing speech about risk. The spheres of Sargon, his wife Thalassa, and his former enemy Henoch, are brought up from the planet. McCoy supervises as Sargon takes Kirk's body again, and Thalassa and Henoch take Mulhall's and Spock's bodies, respectively. When Sargon and Thalassa become exhausted by the strain of the transference, Henoch instructs Nurse Chapel in preparing a serum that will strengthen the host bodies. Chapel notices that the serum in the hypospray designated for Kirk does not contain the correct formula. Henoch confesses that he intends to kill Kirk, and Sargon with him, in order to keep Spock's body. Henoch then erases Chapel's memory of the conversation.

Manufacture of the android hosts begins. Kirk's body weakens more quickly than the others, requiring additional doses of the serum. Henoch tries to tempt Thalassa into keeping their hosts' bodies, because the android forms will be incapable of sensuality. She in turn tries to convince Sargon, but he collapses. McCoy declares that Kirk's body has died and Sargon is gone. Back in sickbay, McCoy is able to revive Kirk's bodily functions, but has no way to restore Kirk's mind. Thalassa offers to restore Kirk in exchange for McCoy's help in keeping Mulhall's body. When McCoy refuses, she assaults him telepathically, but then has a change of heart and relents. The voice of Sargon commends her, and she realizes that Sargon is using the ship itself as a temporary body. She then informs McCoy that Sargon has a plan, and locks him out of the examination room, after which Chapel marches out of sickbay. McCoy re-enters the examination room and finds that Kirk and Mulhall have been returned to their bodies. However, the spheres have been destroyed, including the one that held Spock's mind. Kirk says that this was "necessary", and asks McCoy to prepare a lethal hypospray for Henoch.

Henoch, who has taken control of the bridge and is terrorizing the crew, reads McCoy's mind and prevents the injection. Henoch then commands Chapel to use the lethal compound on McCoy. She moves as if to comply, but then injects Henoch instead. Henoch boasts that he can just transfer to another body, but finds he cannot due to interference from Sargon. Henoch pleads for mercy, but Spock's body collapses, seemingly in death.

Sargon tells Kirk that he could not allow this. Spock's and Chapel's bodies glow, and Spock revives. Sargon reveals that the injection was not lethal; it was important for McCoy and Chapel to believe it was lethal so that Henoch would believe it also. Spock's mind had been temporarily placed in Chapel's body.

Sargon and Thalassa announce that they will not attempt to build host bodies, but will "depart into oblivion" instead. They make a final request, which is granted: to be allowed to use Kirk and Mulhall's bodies one last time to share a kiss.

== Reception ==
Michelle Erica Green of Trek Today writes that the story is "an entertaining and engaging episode about power, loyalty and the struggle between physical and mental pleasures... and because there's an alien in his body, Spock spends a lot of time smiling". Of the characterizations, she adds, "Nimoy appears to be having a wonderful time playing a relaxed, calculating villain, and Shatner portrays Sargon in an amplified booming benevolent voice that makes a nifty contrast to his would-be-Kennedyesque speechifying, expounding on the values that sent humans to the stars".

Green observes, "The skepticism of godlike beings runs very deep on this series", and The A.V. Club's Zach Handlen says on the same theme, "we're dealing with another race of god-beings, but for once, they aren't here to torment Kirk and the rest. This time they actually need help, and it's not because they're bored". Like Green, he enjoys the acting: "Nimoy gets a chance to ham it up here, and it really pays off. He has a half-smirk on his face most of the time, and he makes a great contrast to the somewhat overplayed nobility of Sargon and Thalassa and their love". He gives the episode a B+.

Melissa N. Hayes-Gehrke of the University of Maryland found it "a nearly classic TOS plot, with god-like aliens, beings made only of energy, promises of advanced technology, and the realization that god-like powers are absolutely corrupting". She argued, though, that a "big and frustrating plot hole" is Sargon's dismissal of the idea that Starfleet might build them android bodies. "After all, the Enterprise recently discovered a world populated by advanced androids ('I, Mudd'). In fact, those androids would make anyone a body that they could transfer their mind into. We don't know for sure that those bodies have senses, but it's hard to imagine a human wanting to transfer into one for the purposes of immortality if they were limited in that way. These android bodies seem perfectly suited to Sargon's people, and it's annoying that the lack of series continuity kept it from being mentioned".

Eugene Myers ranked this as a superior example of "several bodyswap/alien possession episodes of the series" in terms of acting: Shatner has a "nuanced performance, walking jerkily as though unaccustomed to legs after eons without a body", while "Nimoy, of course, clearly enjoyed the opportunity to stretch his acting—and facial—muscles, playing out of character ... to smirk, smile, and scheme his way through his scenes". He rated the episode "Warp 6 (on a scale of 1-6)".

== See also ==
- Bride of Frankenstein: A 1935 James Whale horror film which features Frankenstein's monster telling his Bride—who was created unnaturally, out of dead body parts, like him, leading to consequences that disrupted society and killed people—that "We belong dead", just before their deaths.
- The Shadow Out of Time: A 1936 novella by H. P. Lovecraft, wherein ancient aliens switch minds with human bodies in the future.
