= John McGreevey =

American screenwriter (1922–2010)

- Born: John McGreevey; December 21, 1922; Muncie, Indiana, U.S.
- Died: November 24, 2010 (aged 87); Laguna Hills, California
- Occupations: Writer, screenwriter

John McGreevey (December 21, 1922 – November 24, 2010) was an American writer and screenwriter. He is the father of former Disney star and Emmy-nominated television writer Michael McGreevey. The elder McGreevey received four Christopher Awards, an Emmy Award, a Peabody Award, and a Writers Guild Paddy Chayefsky Award. Additionally, he was nominated for another Writers Guild Award, another Emmy Award, and a Silver Dove award

== Early years ==
McGreevey was a native of Muncie, Indiana, who went on to live in other parts of Indiana, including Bloomington, Evansville, and Logansport. He began reading by the time he was 3 years old. By age 6 he was in the third grade at St. Vincent Catholic School in Logansport, and then he skipped from the third grade to the fifth grade. He wrote a play at age 7 and had his two sisters perform it with him with other family members as the audience.

When McGreevey was in high school he wrote, directed, and starred in a play as a fundraiser for the debate team; he subsequently wrote and starred in a production for the yearbook. He attended Indiana University, majoring in English and writing and performing in radio and theater. The drama department performed two of his plays during his senior year there.

== Career ==
McGreevey began his career as a writer at WGBF radio in Evansville. After 18 months there he worked for nine years at KTAR radio in Phoenix, Arizona, primarily writing scripts and occasionally announcing. Additionally, radio networks bought more than 100 scripts that he submitted as a freelance writer for their programs. His first sale of a script came when he was 25 years old and had almost abandoned the idea of writing for network radio. A mail delivery in 1947 brought a $250 check for one of his submissions, and that marked the turning point in his career.

In 1952, after having sold six scripts for television programs, McGreevey moved to New York. TV programs for which McGreevey wrote included Dick Powell's Zane Grey Theatre, Circle Theater, Philco Television Playhouse, Studio One, Suspense, and The Web.

== Personal life ==
McGreevey married Nota Scholl.

== Recognition ==
McGreevey received Indiana University's distinguished alumnus service award in 1973, and he was the main speaker at the university's Alumni Day in 1983. Logansport declared April 26 and 27, 1962, John McGreevey Days.

Partial List of Awards Won by John McGreevey or for Which He Was Nominated
Year	Name of Award	Category	Project	Winner/Nominee
1964	Emmy	Outstanding Writing Achievement In Comedy Or Variety	The Farmer's Daughter	Nominee (shared)
1973	Emmy	Outstanding Writing Achievement In Drama	The Waltons	Winner
1974	Emmy	Best Writing In Drama	The Waltons	Nominee
1977	Emmy	Outstanding Writing In A Special Program - Drama Or Comedy - Adaptation	Judge Horton and The Scottsboro Boys	Nominated

== Filmography ==
Films

- 1969: Hello Down There
- 1970: Crowhaven Farm
- 1975: The Runaways
- 1976: The Disappearance of Aimee
- 1977: The Death of Richie
- 1978: Rainbow
- 1978: The New Adventures of Heidi
- 1978: Ruby and Oswald (co-written with Michael McGreevey)
- 1982: Night Crossing
- 1984: The Return of Marcus Welby, M.D.
- 1984: Aurora
- 1984: Flight 90: Disaster on the Potomac
- 1984: Heller Keller: The Miracle Continues
- 1985: A Time to Live
- 1985: Consenting Adult
- 1988: The Fortunate Pilgrim
- 1988: Unholy Matrimony
- 1990: Hiroshima: Out of the Ashes
- 1990: Call Me Anna
- 1996: Born Free: A New Adventure
- 1993: Firestorm: 72 Hours in Oakland
- 1995: A Dream Is a Wish Your Heart Makes: The Annette Funicello Story
- 1996: Captains Courageous
- 1996: Unabomber: The True Story
- 1997: Ms. Scrooge

TV Series

- 1951: Lights Out (2 episodes)
- 1952: Armstrong Circle Theatre (1 episode)
- 1954: The Web (4 episodes)
- 1954: Danger (2 episodes)
- 1954-1957: Lux Video Theatre (2 episodes)
- 1955: The Pepsi-Cola Playhouse (4 episodes)
- 1955-1956: Star Stage (2 episodes)
- 1955-1956: Studio 57 (5 episodes)
- 1956: Celebrity Playhouse (1 episode)
- 1956: Ford Theatre (1 episode)
- 1956: Screen Directors Playhouse (2 episodes)
- 1956: Lassie (3 episodes)
- 1956-1957: Broken Arrow (2 episodes)
- 1956-1958: Climax! (10 episodes)
- 1956–1959: Zane Grey Theatre (13 episodes)
- 1956-1959: General Electric Theater (4 episodes)
- 1957: The Californians (1 episode)
- 1957: Colt .45 (1 episode)
- 1957: Tombstone Territory (unknown episodes)
- 1957-1958: Schlitz Playhouse of Stars (3 episodes)
- 1957-1959: Trackdown (3 episodes)
- 1958: Studio One (1 episode)
- 1958: Westinghouse Desilu Playhouse (1 episode)
- 1958: Cimarron City (2 episodes)
- 1959-1960: Adventures in Paradise (3 episodes)
- 1959-1960: Black Saddle (16 episodes)
- 1959-1961: Bat Masterson (4 episodes)
- 1960: The Chevy Mystery Show (1 episode)
- 1960–1967: My Three Sons (35 episodes)
- 1961: Michael Shayne (2 episodes)
- 1961: Window on Main Street (1 episode)
- 1961: Checkmate (1 episode)
- 1961-1965: Wagon Train (12 episodes)
- 1962: It's a Man's World (2 episodes)
- 1963: Laramie (1 episode)
- 1963: Route 66 (1 episode)
- 1963-1964: Arrest and Trial (2 episodes)
- 1963-1964: Grindl (3 episodes)
- 1963-1964: The Farmer's Daughter (4 episodes)
- 1963–1966: Hazel (9 episodes)
- 1964: Voyage to the Bottom of the Sea (1 episode)
- 1964: 12 O'Clock High (1 episode)
- 1966: The F.B.I. (1 episode)
- 1966–1971: Family Affair (22 episodes)
- 1967-1970: The Flying Nun (7 episodes)
- 1968-1971: Mayberry R.F.D. (7 episodes)
- 1969: I Dream of Jeannie (1 episode)
- 1969: The Doris Day Show (1 episode)
- 1969: That Girl (1 episode)
- 1969: My World and Welcome to It (1 episode)
- 1969: Here Come the Brides (1 episode)
- 1970: The Name (1 episode)
- 1970: To Rome with Love (1 episode)
- 1970: Nancy (1 episode)
- 1970-1971: Nanny and the Professor (7 episodes)
- 1971-1972: The Smith Family (6 episodes)
- 1972: Circle of Fear (1 episode)
- 1972: Honeymoon Suite (1 episode)
- 1972: Bridget Loves Bernie (1 episode)
- 1972: Owen Marshall, Counselor at Law (1 episode)
- 1972-1973: Room 222 (3 episodes)
- 1972–1978: The Waltons (20 episodes)
- 1974: Doc Elliot (1 episode)
- 1974: Lucas Tanner (1 episode)
- 1974: Apple's Way (1 episode)
- 1975-1981: Insight (6 episodes)
- 1979: Roots: The Next Generations (1 episode)
