= Pine Canyon Is Burning =

1977 television film

- Genre: Drama
- Written by: Robert A. Cinader
- Directed by: Christian I. Nyby II
- Starring: Kent McCord; Megan McCord; Shane Sinutko; Diana Muldaur
- Theme music composer: Lee Holdridge
- Country of origin: United States
- Original language: English

Production
- Executive producer: Robert A. Cinader
- Producers: Gino Grimaldi; Hannah Louise Shearer
- Cinematography: Frank Thackery
- Editor: Albert J.J. Zúñiga
- Running time: 73 min.
- Production company: Universal Television

Original release
- Network: NBC
- Release: May 18, 1977

Pine Canyon is Burning, also known as Quail Lake, is a 1977 American drama film made for television, directed by Christian I. Nyby II and written by Robert A. Cinader. The film, about a widowed firefighter and two children in Pine Canyon, stars Kent McCord, Megan McCord, Shane Sinutko and Diana Muldaur. The 78 minute movie in a 90-minute slot aired on NBC on May 18, 1977.

== Cast ==
- Kent McCord as Capt. William Stone, patrol 99
- Megan McCord as Margaret Stone
- Shane Sinutko as Michael Stone
- Diana Muldaur as Sandra
- Andrew Duggan as Capt. Ed Wilson
- Richard Bakalyan as Charlie Edison
- Brit Lind as Anne Walker
- Curtis Credel as Whitey Olson
- Sandy McPeak as Pete Madison
- Larry Delaney as Captain #78
- Joan Roberts as Woman
