= Beyond Reason (1977 film) =

1977 film by Telly Savalas

- Video cover art (1985)
- Directed by: Telly Savalas
- Screenplay by: Telly Savalas
- Produced by: Howard Koch
- Starring: Telly Savalas; Diana Muldaur; Biff Elliot
- Cinematography: John A. Alonzo
- Edited by: Frank P. Keller
- Music by: Robert Randles
- Production company: Carolco
- Release date: 1985
- Country: United States
- Language: English

Beyond Reason is an independent film directed, starring, and written by Telly Savalas that was produced in 1977. Originally titled Mati, after the title character Dr. Nicholas Mati, the film focused on a psychiatrist who struggles with his grip on reality. Diana Muldaur also starred in the film as Elaine Mati, the doctor's concerned wife. The film was not released theatrically, and became available on home media in 1985.

== Plot ==
After witnessing the traumatic suicide of one of his patients, and much to the chagrin of his loving wife Elaine (Diana Muldaur), well-respected psychiatrist Dr. Nicolas Mati (Telly Savalas) begins to become unhinged. As he loses the grip on his sanity, his obsession with a demure young student intensifies.

== Cast ==
- Telly Savalas as Dr. Nicholas Mati
- Diana Muldaur as Elaine Mati
- Marvin Laird as Vincent
- Bob Basso as Mario
- Walter Brooke as Dr. Grovenor
- Priscilla Barnes as Leslie Valentine #1
- Laura Johnson as Leslie Valentine #2
- Rita Marie Carr as Ann Rogers
- Lilyan Chauvin as Geena
- Biff Elliot as Big Bulge

== Reception ==
The film was never released to theaters. In 1985 it was released to home media, and has received capsule reviews in video guides. One sympathetic author wrote "Telly Savalas shows his stuff in this sensitive film, which he wrote and directed. ... Though thought provoking and touching throughout, the story gets a little muddy from time to time and finishes unsatisfyingly."
