= John T. Dugan =

American screenwriter (1920–1994)

- Born: October 11, 1920; Verplanck, New York, U.S.
- Died: December 24, 1994 (aged 74); Encino, California, U.S.
- Education: Fordham University; Catholic University of America; University of Minnesota
- Occupation: Screenwriter
- Spouse: Jacqueline Bonnot
- Children: 3

John T. Dugan (October 11, 1920 – December 24, 1994) was an American screenwriter. He wrote for television programs, including Bonanza, Mr. Novak, 12 O'Clock High, Dr. Kildare, Adam-12, Star Trek: The Original Series, Ben Casey, Mission: Impossible, Columbo and Little House on the Prairie. Dugan died in December 1994 of pancreatic cancer at his home in Encino, California, at the age of 74.

Dugan was twice nominated for the Writers Guild of America Award for Television: Episodic Drama: in 1968, for the Star Trek: The Original Series episode "Return to Tomorrow"; and in 1980, for the Little House on the Prairie episode "Second Spring".
