= Is There in Truth No Beauty? =

- Star Trek: The Original Series episode
- Episode no.: Season 3 Episode 5
- Directed by: Ralph Senensky
- Written by: Jean Lisette Aroeste
- Cinematography by: Jerry Finnerman
- Production code: 062
- Original air date: October 18, 1968

Guest appearances
- Diana Muldaur – Dr. Miranda Jones; David Frankham – Larry Marvick

Episode chronology
← Previous "And the Children Shall Lead"	Next → "Spectre of the Gun"
- Star Trek: The Original Series season 3

"Is There in Truth No Beauty?" is the fifth episode of the third season of the American science fiction television series Star Trek. Written by Jean Lisette Aroeste and directed by Ralph Senensky, it was first broadcast on October 18, 1968.

In the episode, the Enterprise travels with an alien ambassador whose appearance induces madness.

This episode was the second appearance of Diana Muldaur in the Star Trek franchise. She appeared previously as Dr. Ann Mulhall in the second season episode, "Return to Tomorrow" and later appeared as Dr. Katherine Pulaski in the second season of Star Trek: The Next Generation.

A Medusan named Zero later appeared as a main character in Star Trek: Prodigy. The name of the season 2 episode "Is There in Beauty No Truth?", which focused on Zero, was a homage to this episode.

== Plot ==
The Federation starship Enterprise is assigned to escort Medusan ambassador Kollos and psychologist Dr. Miranda Jones to a rendezvous with a Medusan vessel. Medusans are non-humanoid creatures whose outward appearance is described as being so ugly as to cause humanoids who see them to go insane and then die. Kollos travels in a carrier to hide him from view, and First Officer Spock assists as necessary using a special visor which allows his Vulcan psychology to withstand the sight of Kollos. Jones is also able to observe Kollos with the help of the visor, a fact which she claims is due to Vulcan-style mental discipline.

At a dinner with Captain Kirk and the senior officers, Jones, a telepath, explains that her assignment is to attempt a mind link with Kollos in the hope of allowing Starfleet to utilize the Medusan's unique senses and navigational abilities. In the course of the discussion, Jones breaks off, sensing someone nearby with murderous intentions. She then returns to her quarters, where she is visited by her associate Lawrence Marvick. Marvick is in love with Jones, a feeling which she does not reciprocate, and she senses that he is the would-be murderer. He then makes his way to Kollos's quarters with a phaser, but is overcome by the sight of the Medusan before he can fire. Now insane, Marvick rushes to Engineering, overpowers and renders unconscious Chief Engineer Scott and other crew members, and takes control of the engines. The Enterprise quickly accelerates past Warp Factor 9.5, which takes it far outside of the galaxy and into a strange swirling void. Marvick, now restrained, screams wild accusations at Jones before he dies.

With no navigational references, the Enterprise crew cannot return home. Kirk suggests that Kollos's superior navigational abilities could be of use, and Spock volunteers to mind meld with Kollos, allowing the two to pilot the Enterprise as one entity. Miranda Jones objects that she is a more logical choice, but McCoy reveals that she is blind and therefore couldn't possibly pilot a starship. (Her jeweled wrap, it turns out, is actually an elaborate sensor web designed to compensate for her blindness).

A partition is set up on the bridge to hide Kollos, and Spock, wearing the visor, completes the mind link. Kollos and Spock, acting through Spock's body, successfully return the Enterprise to known space, and then retire behind the partition to dissolve the link, but Spock forgets the visor. Kirk shouts a warning, but Spock, unable to look away in time, goes mad and attacks the crew. He is subdued by a phaser blast from Kirk and rushed to Sickbay, where his condition deteriorates. Jones attempts to make mental contact with Spock but is apparently unable to help, and Kirk suggests that she, in her jealousy, does not really wish to. Enraged by the accusation, she makes one more attempt, and succeeds in bringing Spock's mind back to reality.

The Enterprise arrives at its destination, and Kollos and Jones prepare to depart. Jones thanks Kirk for his insight, crediting it with ensuring her future. Kollos and Jones are now "one", and she now knows the joy of the mind link for herself. Kirk gives Jones a rose as they leave, reminding her that every rose has thorns.

== Production and reception ==
This was the final episode filmed in the series' production that featured Eddie Paskey as Lt. Leslie. As the episodes were however shown out of production order, the final episode to feature the character was "Elaan of Troyius".

The title is taken from a line in the poem "Jordan" by George Herbert. The Vulcan philosophy "Infinite Diversity in Infinite Combinations" first appeared in the episode. Show creator Gene Roddenberry inserted a speech by Kirk praising the philosophy and associated medal. The "pointless" speech was, according to William Shatner, a "thinly-veiled commercial" for replicas of the medal, which Roddenberry's company Lincoln Enterprises soon sold to fans.

== Releases ==
This was released on LaserDisc in 1987 in the United States, paired with "And the Children Shall Lead" on one double-sided 12-inch disc.

This episode was released in Japan on December 21, 1993, as part of the complete season 3 LaserDisc set, Star Trek: Original Series log.3. A trailer for this and the other episodes was also included, and the episode had English and Japanese audio tracks. The cover script was スター・トレック TVサードシーズン

This episode was included in TOS Season 3 remastered DVD box set, with the remastered version of this episode.
