= Vanity Fair (1967 TV serial) =

- DVD cover
- Based on: Vanity Fair by William Makepeace Thackeray
- Screenplay by: Rex Tucker
- Directed by: David Giles
- Starring: Susan Hampshire
- Music by: Douglas Gamley (unknown episodes)
- Original language: English

Production
- Producer: David Conroy
- Running time: 5x1 hour

Original release
- Network: BBC
- Release: 2 December – 30 December 1967

Vanity Fair is a five-part BBC television drama serial adaptation of William Makepeace Thackeray's 1848 novel of the same name broadcast in 1967. It was the first drama serial in colour produced by the BBC. Vanity Fair starred Susan Hampshire as Becky Sharp. The serial was also broadcast in 1972 in the US on PBS television as part of Masterpiece Theatre, and Hampshire received an Emmy Award for her portrayal in 1973.

This was the second of four television adaptations of Vanity Fair produced by the BBC; other serials had been transmitted in 1956/57, in 1987, and in 1998.

== Plot summary ==
For a full-length summary of the book, see: Vanity Fair plot summary.

== Episodes ==
Episode	Title	Run Time	BBC Air Date	US Air Date
Part One	The Famous Little Becky Puppet	41:11	2 Dec 1967	1 Oct 1972
Part Two	The Dragoon	44:05	9 Dec 1967	8 Oct 1972
Part Three	The Celebrated Battle Scene	44:15	16 Dec 1967	15 Oct 1972
Part Four	The Wicked Nobleman	44:31	23 Dec 1967	22 Oct 1972
Part Five	Vanitas Vanitatum	44:19	30 Dec 1967	29 Oct 1972

== Cast ==
- Susan Hampshire as Becky Sharp
- Dyson Lovell as Rawdon Crawley
- Bryan Marshall as Captain Dobbin
- Marilyn Taylerson as Amelia Osborne
- Roy Marsden as George Osborne
- John Moffatt as Jos Sedley
- Barbara Couper as Miss Matilda Crawley
- Barbara Leake as Mrs Sedley
- Michael Rothwell as Pitt Crawley
- Deddie Davies as Lady Crawley
- Howard Taylor as Horrocks
- John Welsh as Sir Pitt Crawley
- Mark Allington as Ensign Stubble
- Thelma Barlow as Miss Briggs
- Richard Caldicot as Mr Osborne
- Robert Flemyng as Lord Steyne

== Awards ==
- 1973: Emmy Award - Outstanding Continued Performance by an Actress in a Leading Role (Drama/Comedy - Limited Episodes) - Susan Hampshire.

== DVD ==
This adaptation is now available on DVD, distributed by Acorn Media UK.
