= Susan Hampshire =

British actress (born 1937)

Susan Hampshire CBE
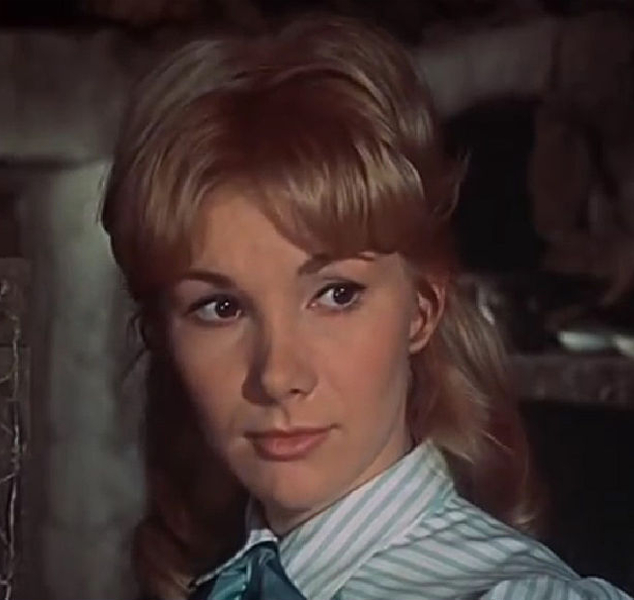
- Hampshire in a trailer for The Three Lives of Thomasina (1963)
- Born: 12 May 1937 (age 89); London, England, UK
- Occupation: Actress
- Years active: 1947–present
- Spouses: Pierre Granier-Deferre (m. 1967; div. 1974); Sir Eddie Kulukundis (m. 1981; died 2021)
- Children: 2

Susan Hampshire, Lady Kulukundis (born 12 May 1937) is an English actress. She is a three-time Emmy Award winner, winning for the television dramas, The Forsyte Saga in 1970, The First Churchills in 1971, and for Vanity Fair in 1973. Her film credits include During One Night (1961), The Long Shadow (1961), The Three Lives of Thomasina (1963), Night Must Fall (1964), Wonderful Life (1964), The Fighting Prince of Donegal (1966), The Trygon Factor (1966), The Violent Enemy (1967), Malpertuis (1971), Living Free (1972), Neither the Sea Nor the Sand (1972) and Bang! (1977).

She is also known for her other television roles, such as The Pallisers (1974), The Grand (1997–98), and as Molly MacDonald in the long running BBC One drama Monarch of the Glen (2000–2005).

== Early life ==
Susan Hampshire was born in Kensington, London, to George Kenneth Hampshire and his wife June (née Pavey) and is of Irish descent. The youngest of four children, she had two sisters and one brother. Her mother was a teacher and her father was a director of Imperial Chemical Industries (ICI), who was rarely at home, her parents having unofficially separated. As a child, she had some developmental difficulties, unable to spell her name until she was nine and unable to read well until she was 12. Her determined mother founded a small London school in 1928, the Hampshire (now Gems Hampshire School), where Susan Hampshire was taught.

Her childhood ambition was to be a nurse, but she later decided to become an actress. She was diagnosed as dyslexic at the age of 30.

== Career ==
As an actress, Hampshire worked in the theatre before moving to film and television work. She took the title role in a dramatised version of Little Black Sambo recorded by the His Master's Voice Junior Record Club in 1961 (words by David Croft, music by Cyril Ornadel) and sang on The Midday Show when ITV Anglia began broadcasting (as Anglia Television) in 1959. Her first starring role was in the film During One Night in 1960. She then took the leading role in a 1962 BBC adaptation of What Katy Did. Soon afterwards, she was taken up by Walt Disney and starred in The Three Lives of Thomasina (opposite Patrick McGoohan) and The Fighting Prince of Donegal. She would later appear opposite McGoohan again, in two episodes of Danger Man. She co-starred with Cliff Richard in Sidney J. Furie's 1964 musical Wonderful Life.

In 1966, she was introduced to American TV viewers in the pilot episode of The Time Tunnel as a young passenger on the Titanic who befriends Dr Tony Newman. She later portrayed conservationist Joy Adamson in Living Free, the sequel to Born Free. In 1972, she played three different characters in Malpertuis, directed by Harry Kumel. She is known for her work on television, appearing in several popular television serials, including The Andromeda Breakthrough (1962) in which she replaced Julie Christie who was not available for the show but had played the part of Andromeda in the first season of A for Andromeda (1961). Her most notable television role in the 1960s came in the BBC's 1967 adaptation of The Forsyte Saga, in which she played Fleur.

Hampshire received Emmy Awards from the Academy of Television Arts & Sciences for her roles in The Forsyte Saga (1970), The First Churchills (1969) and Vanity Fair (1973). In 1973, she appeared again on US television with Kirk Douglas in a musical version of Dr. Jekyll and Mr. Hyde. Other miniseries in which she appeared are The Pallisers, The Barchester Chronicles and Coming Home. She was the subject of This Is Your Life in 1992 when she was surprised by Michael Aspel at the Ritz Hotel. In 1997, she appeared in the ITV television series The Grand where she played a madame residing in the hotel. More recent TV roles include Molly MacDonald, Lady of Glenbogle, in Monarch of the Glen (2000–05) and an appearance in Casualty (Series 26, No Goodbyes, 19 November 2011) as Caitlin Northwick.

Hampshire has been active on the stage, taking the lead roles in many leading plays. In 2007, she was in the play The Bargain, based on a meeting between Robert Maxwell and Mother Teresa. She played the Fairy Godmother in pantomime at the New Wimbledon Theatre in 2005–06 and at the New Victoria Theatre in Woking in 2006–07. In 2008, she joined the relatively small band of actors who have played two generations in the same play on different occasions. Her appearance at the Chichester Festival Theatre in Somerset Maugham's The Circle as Lady Catherine Champion-Cheney in 2008 followed on from her appearance in the same play (and venue) as Elizabeth Champion-Cheney (Lady Catherine's daughter-in-law) in 1976.

== Author and charity work ==
Until the publication in 1981 of her autobiography, Susan's Story, few people were aware of Hampshire's struggle with dyslexia. Since then, she has become a prominent campaigner in the UK on dyslexia issues and was president of the Dyslexia Institute from 1995 to 1998.

Her second book, The Maternal Instinct (1984), discussed women and fertility issues and she published a collection of interviews, Every Letter Counts: Winning in Life Despite Dyslexia, in 1990. She has written children's books, including Lucy Jane at the Ballet, Lucy Jane and the Russian Ballet, Lucy Jane and the Dancing Competition, Lucy Jane on Television, Bear's Christmas, Rosie's First Ballet Lesson and Rosie's Ballet Slippers as well as various books and videos about her lifelong hobby of gardening, including Easy Gardening, My Secret Garden and Trouble Free Gardening.

She is a patron of the British Homeopathic Association, HIV charity Body Positive Dorset, The National Osteoporosis Society, Dignity in Dying, children's education charity Life Education Wessex and Thames Valley and population concern charity Population Matters. She is also patron of Mousetrap Theatre Projects in London which supports theatre productions for the enjoyment of disadvantaged and disabled children. She holds the position of vice-president at Juvenile Diabetes Research Foundation Ltd, UK. She is also a vice-president of The International Tree Foundation.

== Personal life ==
Hampshire was married to her first husband, the French film producer Pierre Granier-Deferre, from 1967 until 1974. The couple have a son, Christopher Granier-Deferre, a film director and producer. Their daughter died within 24 hours of her birth.

She was married to her second husband, Sir Eddie Kulukundis, the theatre impresario, shipping magnate, and sport philanthropist, from 1981 until his death in 2021.

Hampshire was appointed Officer of the Order of the British Empire (OBE) in the 1995 Birthday Honours for services to dyslexic people and Commander of the Order of the British Empire (CBE) in the 2018 New Year Honours for services to drama and charity.

== Filmography ==
Key
†	Denotes works that have not yet been released

Film
Year	Title	Role	Notes
1947	The Woman in the Hall	Young Jay	
1959	Idol on Parade	Martha	
1959	Upstairs and Downstairs	Arriving Passenger	Uncredited
1959	Expresso Bongo	Cynthia	Uncredited
1960	During One Night	Jean	
1961	The Long Shadow	Gunilla	
1963	The Three Lives of Thomasina	Lori MacGregor	
1964	Night Must Fall	Olivia Greyne	
1964	Wonderful Life	Jenny Taylor	
1964	A Hard Day's Night	Dancer at Disco	Uncredited
1966	Paris in August	Patricia Seagrave	Paris au mois d'août (French title)
1966	The Fighting Prince of Donegal	Kathleen McSweeney	
1966	The Trygon Factor	Trudy Emberday	
1967	The Violent Enemy	Hannah Costello	
1969	Monte Carlo or Bust!	Betty	
1971	A Time for Loving	Patricia Robinson	
1971	Malpertuis	Nancy / Euryale / Alice (Alecto) / Nurse / Charlotte	
1972	Living Free	Joy Adamson	
1972	Neither the Sea Nor the Sand	Anna Robinson	
1973	Le fils	L'Américaine	Uncredited; The Son (English title)
1973	No encontré rosas para mi madre	Elaine	The Lonely Woman (English title)
1977	Bang!	Cilla Brown	
2001	Eve Buckingham	Eve Buckingham	Short
2017	Another Mother's Son	Elena Le Fevre	
2018	An Ideal Husband	Lady Markby	
2021	Smyrni mou agapimeni	Lady Whittall	Smyrna, my Beloved (English title)
TBA	Maurice's Jubilee †	Helena	Pre-production

Television
Year	Title	Role	Notes
1958	Theatre Night	Ensemble	Series 2, Episode 4
1959	Probation Officer	Jane	Series 1, Episode 6
1961	Armchair Theatre	Gerta Blake	Series 5, Episode 33
1961	Adventures in Paradise	Estelle Heydin	Series 3, Episode 1
1962	Sir Francis Drake	Celia	Series 1, Episode 14
1962	The Andromeda Breakthrough	Andromeda	Series 1: 6 episodes
1962	Katy	Katy Carr	Series 1: 8 episodes
1963	ITV Television Playhouse	Gloria • Delphinie	Series 8, Episode 34 & Episode 37
1964	First Night	Jenny	Series 1, Episode 33
1965	Danger Man	Lena • Lesley Arden	Series 3, Episode 4 & Episode 10
1965	Court Martial	Evelyn Tarrant	Series 1, Episode 11
1966	The Time Tunnel	Althea Hall	Series 1, Episode 1
1967	Coronet Blue	Alix Frame	Series 1, Episode 1
1967	The Forsyte Saga	Fleur Mont (née Forsyte)	Series 1: 14 episodes
1967	Jackanory	Storyteller	Series 3: 5 episodes
1967	Vanity Fair	Becky Sharp	Miniseries: 5 episodes
1968	Theatre 625	Isabella	Series 5, Episode 16
1969	BBC Play of the Month	Mabel Chiltern	Series 4, Episode 9
1969	The First Churchills	Sarah Churchill, Duchess of Marlborough	Miniseries: 12 episodes
1970	David Copperfield	Agnes Wickfield	TV film
1972	Baffled!	Michele Brent	TV film
1973	Dr. Jekyll & Mr. Hyde	Isabel	TV film
1974	The Pallisers	Lady Glencora M'Cluskie	Miniseries: 26 episodes
1975	Thriller	Sally	Series 6, Episode 5
1976	The Story of David	Michal	TV film
1981	Dick Turpin	Lady Melford	Series 3, Episodes 1 & 5
1982	The Barchester Chronicles	Signora Madeline Neroni	Miniseries: 5 episodes
1984–85	Leaving	Martha Ford	Series 1 & 2: 12 episodes
1992	Don't Tell Father	Natasha Bancroft	Series 1: 6 episodes
1997–98	The Grand	Esme Harkness	Series 1 & 2: 18 episodes
1998	Coming Home	Miss Catto	Miniseries: 2 episodes
1999	Nancherrow	Miss Catto	Miniseries: 2 episodes
2000–05	Monarch of the Glen	Molly MacDonald	Series 1–7: 60 episodes
2003	Sparkling Cyanide	Lucilla Drake	TV film
2009	The Royal	Elizabeth Middleditch	Series 7 & 8: 2 episodes
2011–13	Casualty	Caitlin Northwick • Sylvia Black	Series 26, Episode 13 • Series 28, Episode 16
2017	Midsomer Murders	Delphi Hartley	Series 19, Episode 4
2025	The Forsytes	Lady Carteret	Miniseries: 6 episodes

== Awards and nominations ==
Year	Award	Category	Nominated work	Result	Ref.
1970	Primetime Emmy Awards	Outstanding Continued Performance by an Actress in a Leading Role in a Dramatic Series	The Forsyte Saga	Won	
1971	Primetime Emmy Awards	Outstanding Continued Performance by an Actress in a Leading Role in a Dramatic Series	The First Churchills	Won	
1973	Primetime Emmy Awards	Outstanding Continued Performance by an Actress in a Leading Role (Drama/Comedy - Limited Episodes)	Vanity Fair	Won	
1976	TP de Oro	Best Foreign Actress (Mejor Actriz Extranjera)	The Forsyte Saga	3rd place	
