= Diana Muldaur =

American actress (born 1938)

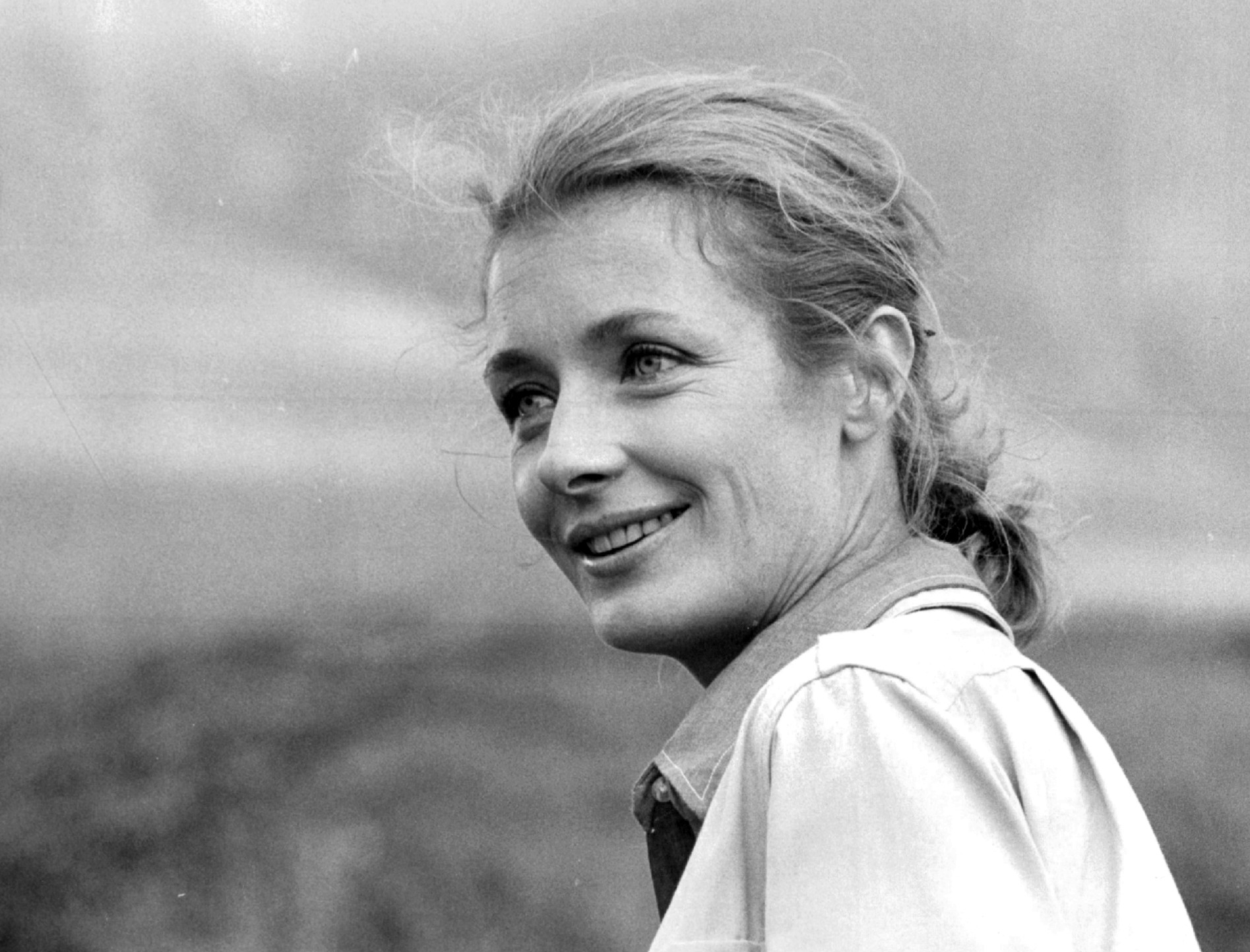
- Muldaur in 1974's Born Free
- Born: August 19, 1938 (age 88); New York City, New York, U.S.
- Education: Sweet Briar College
- Occupation: Actress
- Years active: 1962–present
- Known for: L.A. Law; Star Trek: The Next Generation; McCloud; Born Free
- Spouses: James Vickery (m. 1969; died 1979) Robert Dozier (m. 1981; died 2012)

Diana Muldaur (born August 19, 1938) is an American film and television actress. Muldaur's television roles include Rosalind Shays on L.A. Law and Dr. Katherine Pulaski in the second season of Star Trek: The Next Generation. She appeared in two episodes of Star Trek: The Original Series in the late 1960s, playing different roles (Drs. Miranda Jones and Ann Mulhall). She has been nominated for an Emmy twice, as a supporting actress on L.A. Law in 1990 and 1991.

Born in Brooklyn, New York, and raised on the Massachusetts island of Martha's Vineyard, Muldaur started acting in high school and continued on through college, graduating from Sweet Briar College in Virginia in 1960. She studied acting under Stella Adler, and made her name on the New York stage. She was at one point a board member of the Screen Actors Guild and was the first woman to serve as president of the Academy of Television Arts & Sciences (1983–1985).

== Early career ==
In 1965, Muldaur landed the role of Ann Wicker in the CBS daytime soap opera The Secret Storm. She then did a five-episode arc as Jeannie Orloff in the final season of Richard Chamberlain's NBC medical drama Dr. Kildare.

Various roles as a guest star in episodes of numerous television shows followed, including Bonanza, I Spy, The Courtship of Eddie's Father, The Invaders, Mannix, The Mod Squad, Hawaii Five-O, The F.B.I., The Virginian, a two-episode arc on the Ben Gazzara drama Run for Your Life, and as a guest star in 1975 in S.W.A.T. playing Kate Darby in the episode "Terror Ship".

Collaborations between Muldaur and Burt Reynolds began when Muldaur appeared in an episode of Hawk (1966), a weekly procedural with Reynolds in the title role. Subsequently, they guest-starred in a third-season episode of The F.B.I. (1968), and Muldaur guest-starred in an episode of Reynolds' series Dan August (1970).

In 1967, Muldaur guest-starred on the Gunsmoke episode "Fandango" with James Arness. An excerpt of that episode's dialogue was sampled on the Pink Floyd album The Wall, after "Hey You" and before the brief song "Is There Anybody Out There?"

In 1968, Muldaur appeared in the original Star Trek episodes "Return to Tomorrow" as astrobiologist Lieutenant Commander/Dr. Ann Mulhall, and in "Is There in Truth No Beauty?" as psychologist Dr. Miranda Jones. During this time, a friendship with creator Gene Roddenberry formed that led to him casting Muldaur as Marg in the television film Planet Earth (1974) with John Saxon. Later, she appeared as Dr. Katherine Pulaski in 20 episodes of the second season of Star Trek: The Next Generation (1988–1989).

Muldaur's first major role was as Belle in the ABC primetime serial Harold Robbins' The Survivors (1970). The soap, intended as a comeback vehicle for Hollywood star Lana Turner, was cancelled early into the 1970 television season after 15 episodes.

== Supporting roles in films ==
After the cancellation of The Survivors, Muldaur accepted a number of supporting roles in motion pictures, including The Swimmer (1968) with Burt Lancaster, football film Number One (1969), and psychological thriller The Other (1972) with Uta Hagen. She also appeared in Sidney J. Furie's The Lawyer (1970), One More Train to Rob (1971) with George Peppard and the John Wayne crime drama, McQ (1974).

Muldaur appeared in the ensemble-apocalypse thriller Chosen Survivors (1974) with Jackie Cooper, Richard Jaeckel, and Barbara Babcock. In 1977, she played Elaine Mati, the concerned wife of mentally unstable doctor Telly Savalas in the independent film Beyond Reason.

== Other television guest-starring roles ==
In 1967, Muldaur guest-starred on Mannix episode "Coffin for a Clown". In 1971, she appeared as Rachel Bonham in The Men From Shiloh (rebranded name for the TV Western The Virginian) in the episode titled "The Politician". Muldaur guest-starred in a first-season episode of Alias Smith and Jones, "The Great Shell Game" in 1971. In the second season of Kung Fu in 1973, opposite David Carradine, she guest-starred in the episode "The Elixir" playing a traveling-show woman who yearned for freedom from men—topical at the time—and starred in the pilot episode of Charlie's Angels. In a 1972 Hawaii Five-O episode, she was a guest star along with Ricardo Montalbán.

She had a recurring role as Judge Eleanor Hooper on The Tony Randall Show during the show's 1976–1978 run, and was a guest star in season two of Fantasy Island. Muldaur guest-starred on The Incredible Hulk, playing the part of Helen Banner, David Banner's sister, in the season-three episode "Homecoming" in November 1979. In 1981, she played a nun in the fifth-season episode "Sanctuary".

In 1975, she made a guest appearance in an episode of The Rockford Files as Mrs. Bannister, a married woman who has an affair with a former cellmate of the series' title character. During this time, Muldaur also appeared on Police Woman, Quincy M.E., The Streets of San Francisco, The Love Boat, The Hardy Boys/Nancy Drew Mysteries, and Hart to Hart, among others. She appeared in the first season of Angela Lansbury's Murder, She Wrote.

== Recurring television roles ==
=== 1970s–1980s ===
Muldaur had a recurring role on the seven-season Dennis Weaver mystery series McCloud as Chris Coughlin, McCloud's love interest. Her character was introduced in the pilot episode in 1970, and made her last of 16 appearances in April 1977. She reprised her role as Chris for the 1989 reunion movie The Return of Sam McCloud.

Muldaur was cast as conservationist Joy Adamson in the television drama Born Free about Elsa the Lioness. Filming for the ambitious project, which co-starred Gary Collins, took place in Kenya, and the NBC series, which debuted in the fall of 1974, lasted one season. Guest stars on Born Free included several of Muldaur's future co-stars, including Alex Cord (Chosen Survivors) and Susan Dey (L.A. Law).

In 1979, Muldaur starred with David Huddleston in the short-lived NBC sitcom Hizzonner, which lasted just seven episodes and co-starred Kathy Cronkite, daughter of news anchor Walter Cronkite. She played the mayor's secretary, Ginny.

First an Emmy-winning miniseries and then a weekly drama, A Year in the Life was a critical success for NBC, with a cast including Richard Kiley and Sarah Jessica Parker. As Dr. Alice Foley, Muldaur praised the show as an example of how television was becoming more realistic about women.

=== Star Trek: The Next Generation ===
Muldaur is known for playing "dignified, sophisticated characters". Gene Roddenberry was already familiar with Muldaur from her second-season appearance in the Star Trek episode, "Return to Tomorrow", and later in a third-season appearance in "Is There in Truth No Beauty?". He subsequently cast her in his 1973 TV movie Planet Earth. Consequently, for the second season of Star Trek: The Next Generation, Roddenberry chose her specifically to replace the outgoing Gates McFadden (who was let go at the insistence of the show's first-season producer Maurice Hurley). Muldaur was cast to play the role of Dr. Pulaski, the new chief medical officer. "We needed someone with a little more of an edge," Rick Berman explained of the choice. "Kate's a strong, confident woman with an edge who can hold her own with Captain Picard. Their relationship is not all that unlike the one between Kirk and McCoy ... although from the onset we had no intention of trying to duplicate the original team."

Muldaur said after her casting

I hadn't kept in touch with Gene over the years. I'd only done a pilot of his, Planet Earth, in 1974, so this call was totally out of the blue. I love being back in Star Trek. It's a challenge, but a healthy challenge. I find so much TV depressing—even the sitcoms. The chances of shows working and being funny or meaningful are very slim, but this show is very exciting. It has such an uplifting view of humanity in the 24th century. They want the crafty old doctor, so basically I'm a woman Dr. McCoy.

Of Pulaski's willingness to stand up to the captain, Muldaur said

We've been in a fairly stormy relationship due to two very strong personalities, but we end up admiring each other. I'm also giving Brent Spiner (as the android, Data) a very hard time, treating him as a total machine, because that's how I see him, a machine that I can't treat and I don't deal with. But I'm also beginning to see the wonderful android that he is.

Some television critics praised Muldaur's performance, with one noting her "wry, no-nonsense warmth that plays nicely off of some of the icier regulars". The addition of Muldaur, along with Whoopi Goldberg, also served to redress the absence of women from the principal cast, as the departure of McFadden and Denise Crosby had left only Marina Sirtis, a rapid attrition of women that recalled the imbalance of the original Star Trek series.

Ultimately, Muldaur found working on the syndicated show an "unhappy" experience, saying, "The imagination and joy wasn't there". "Everybody was out for themselves. I don't think they were happy to have me there." "It wasn't what I hoped it would be. I thought it would be wonderfully inventive and wonderfully creative, and I found it was not any of those things, but it did give me Trekkies. I love Trekkies. I find them very dear."

The character also proved unpopular with some fans, who among other things found her treatment of the android character Data to be mean-spirited. Muldaur left the series after a season. Show representatives denied that she had been fired, saying, "Technically, she's just not returning", while other sources said that her option had not been renewed. Roddenberry described Muldaur as "a most talented actress" and said that the decision "to let her go was made solely because the hoped-for chemistry between her and the rest of the starship cast did not develop." Berman added, "The thought of bringing Gates back was a good idea to us. The feeling was that we had perhaps made a mistake, and the best way to remedy it was to bring her back." The "revolving door" and the limited opportunities for female crew led critics to suggest that the mostly male series still had a problem featuring women.

=== L.A. Law ===
Muldaur subsequently earned two Emmy nominations for her role as lawyer Rosalind Shays on L.A. Law. Of Roz's creation, by prolific television writer David E. Kelley, Muldaur said:

We didn't think of her as an evil wench at the time. I don't think they knew, and I don't think I knew, what she was going to evolve into. Obviously, they wanted her to stir things up in the office. I don't think they quite understood how she was going to stir things up in America ... The hardest part is having to gear up to play her because some of the things she does are so horrifying. I just say, "Oh, no, they can't have her doing that." If it were a man doing the same thing, no one would blink. In fact, it wouldn't even be good copy. It goes on every day. It's that a woman is doing... things a man has done forever and ever.

In one episode of the Stephen Bochco drama, Jill Eikenberry's character Ann Kelsey tells Shays: "If you were a man, you'd be applauded for your achievements." Muldaur insisted her character "was just too strong for a lot of men".

Muldaur described the L.A. Law actors as "the closest family", and said she was "thrilled" to play a villain like Shays after portraying "everybody's mistress for 20 years", and expressed fascination with the public reception for Shays:

Not my kind of lady at all. I often read a script and am just horrified. I can't believe they'd be having me do these things. I find very little to like about her. But I'm shocked by the reaction of people. They say, "Yea! Rosalind!" A lot of women come up to me and say, "I wish I could have said something like that when so-and-so said such-and-such to me." I think, "What a terrible thing to want to do," but they mean it. I don't think anybody would have really noticed if it had been a man. They would have said, "He's a pain in the neck," or something, but they wouldn't have doubted his word for a second. I'm doing some things now that horrify me, but if Leland had done the same things, nobody would be reacting the way they are now.

The surprise scene where Roz and Leland are seen in bed together was ranked as the 38th-greatest moment in television in an issue of EGG magazine. Equally spectacular was Roz's fatal exit from the show, falling down an elevator shaft. Muldaur joked: "I was as shocked as everybody else. I thought maybe I had asked for too much money!"

Jill Eikenberry, who played Ann Kelsey on L.A. Law, said on E! True Hollywood Story that the whole L.A. Law cast loved the dynamic between Muldaur and Richard Dysart, and that they were all very sad to see Muldaur leave the show.

=== Other television series ===
In 1975, Muldaur appeared in one episode in the first season of The Rockford Files. In 1977, she guest-starred in the second episode ("Mirror Image") of the short-lived CBS espionage series Hunter. Early in 1979, she guest-starred in the second episode ("Dewey and Harold and Sarah and Maggie") of the NBC anthology series $weepstake$. In the early 1990s, she also guest-starred on two episodes of Matlock, as well as Empty Nest with Richard Mulligan and the pilot for Aaron Spelling's Hearts Are Wild. Muldaur provided the voice of Dr. Leslie Thompkins on Batman: The Animated Series from 1992 to 1994.

== Television films ==
In 1973, Muldaur co-starred in the television film Call to Danger as Carrie Donovon, a Justice Department investigator. In 1974, Muldaur starred in The Wonderful World of Disney presentation of Hog Wild! with John Ericson and Kim Richards for NBC. In 1979, she starred in the made-for-television film version of The Miracle Worker in which she played the role of Katie Keller, the mother of Helen Keller. The NBC film starred Melissa Gilbert and Patty Duke Astin.

In an attempt to capitalize on Burt Reynolds' international superstardom, Muldaur's performance in the pilot episode of the Reynolds-Norman Fell crime series, Dan August (1970–1971) was edited together with a subsequent episode and repackaged as a 1980 ABC Movie of the Week titled Dan August: The Jealousy Factor.

In 1991, Muldaur played Lauren Jeffreys, the main client of Perry Mason (Raymond Burr) in the NBC television film Perry Mason and the Case of the Fatal Fashion. Muldaur had previously worked with Burr as a guest star on the detective series Ironside (1971) and his short-lived series Kingston: Confidential (1977).

Her other television films include the Black Beauty miniseries (1977), Pine Canyon is Burning (1977), Maneaters Are Loose! (1978), The Word (1978), and Joseph Wambaugh's two-hour film Police Story: A Cry for Justice (1978) with Dennis Weaver and Larry Hagman. Muldaur teamed with The Smothers Brothers for Terror at Alcatraz (1982) and turned in strong dramatic performances in Murder in Three Acts (1986) opposite Peter Ustinov and Locked Up: A Mother's Rage (1991) with Jean Smart and Angela Bassett.

== Personal life ==
Muldaur is a 1960 graduate of Sweet Briar College, a small, private women's liberal arts college in central Virginia. She is the older sister of singer-songwriter Geoff Muldaur, who is the former husband of singer Maria Muldaur. She is also the aunt of singer-songwriter Jenni Muldaur and singer-songwriter Clare Muldaur-Manchon. She lived in Los Angeles from 1970 to 1991. Muldaur was married to actor James Vickery, her co-star on The Secret Storm, until his death from cancer in 1979. She then married writer and producer Robert Dozier (son of producer William Dozier), who died of prostate cancer in 2012. Muldaur is a former Airedale Terrier breeder and owner. At one point, Muldaur contemplated a face lift, noting in 2000 at the age of 61, "You don't see many people my age on television", but eventually decided against it, remarking, "Somebody has to look the right age". Her stated ambition is "to play all the great women's roles... I'd love to play Lady Macbeth."

== Selected filmography ==
Title	Year	Role	Notes	Refs
The Swimmer	1968	Cynthia		
Number One	1969	Ann Marley		
The Lawyer	1970	Ruth Petrocelli		
One More Train to Rob	1971	Katy		
The Other	1972	Alexandra		
McQ	1974	Lois		
Planet Earth	1974	Marg		
Chosen Survivors	1974	Alana Fitzgerald		
Pine Canyon is Burning	1977	Sandra		
Beyond Reason	1985	Elaine		
Murder in Three Acts	1986	Angela Stafford		
Locked Up: A Mother's Rage	1991	Frances		
Finding Hannah	2022	Anat Bergman		

== Television ==
Year	Title	Role	Notes
1963	The Doctors	Carol Carter, Ann Carwell	2 episodes
1964	The DuPont Show of the Week	Dorothy	Episode: "Ambassador at Large"
1964	Mr. Broadway	Receptionist	Episode: "Don't Mention My Name in Sheboygan"
1965	For the People	The Woman	Episode: "Seized, Confined and Detained"
1966	Dr. Kildare	Jeannie Orloff	5 episodes
1966	Hawk	Laura Case	Episode: "The Man Who Owned Everyone"
1966	T.H.E. Cat	Lilah Hadis	Episode: "None to Weep, None to Mourn"
1966	New York Television Theatre		Episode: "The Dark Lady of the Sonnets"
1967	Gunsmoke	Laurel Tyson	Episode: "Fandango"
1967	Judd, for the Defense	Gloria Morton	Episode: "The Money Farm"
1967	Run for Your Life	Dr. Jean Winters	Episode: "Cry Hard, Cry Fast
1968	I Spy	Sally	Episode: "This Guy Smith"
1968	The Invaders	Claire	Episode: "The Life Seekers"
1968	The Outcasts	Peg Skinner	Episode: "A Ride to Vengeance"
1968	Bonanza	Mary Roman	Episode: "The Passing of a King"
1968	Star Trek: The Original Series	Ann Mulhall / Thalassa, Dr. Miranda Jones	2 episodes: "Return to Tomorrow", "Is There in Truth No Beauty?"
1968	The Felony Squad	Margaret Collins	Episode: "The Distant Shore"
1969	The Courtship of Eddie's Father	Lynn Bardman	Episode: "And Eddie Makes Three"
1969	The Survivors	Belle	10 episodes
1970	The Mod Squad	Claire Tragis	Episode: "The Loser"
1970	Dan August	Elizabeth	Episode: "Murder by Proxy"
1970-1972	Hawaii Five O	Various	3 episodes
1967-1971	The Virginian	Laura Messinger, Rachel Bonham	2 episodes
1971	Alias Smith and Jones	Grace Turner	Episode: "The Great Shell Game"
1971	The Name of the Game	Terry Lanson	Episode: "Beware of the Watchdog"
1971	Marcus Welby, M.D.	Ann Rolf	Episode: "Tender Comrade"
1971	Ironside	Captain Pauline Daniels	Episode: "Good Samaritan"
1968-1972	The F.B.I.	Irene Davis, Irene Devers	2 episodes
1972	Medical Center	Dr. Harper	Episode: "Doctor and Mr. Harper"
1972	Banyon	Paula Vander	Episode: "Dead End"
1972	The Bold Ones: The New Doctors	Ann Dahms	Episode: "The Velvet Prison"
1973	Hec Ramsey	Rose Ryan, Miss Savannah	Episode: "Mystery of the Yellow Rose"
1973	Call to Danger	Carrie Donovan	Television film
1973	Search	Sheila	Episode: "Ends of the Earth"
1972-1973	Owen Marshall, Counselor at Law	Gloria Shields, Janet	2 episodes
1973	Ordeal	Kay Damian	Television film
1973	The ABC Afternoon Playbreak		Episode: "A Special Act of Love"
1967-1973	Mannix	Fran Webber; Leslie Carlson; Jan Holloway	3 episodes
1973	Kung Fu	Theodora	Episode: "The Elixir"
1974	Hog Wild	Martha Melborne	Television film
1974	The Wonderful World of Disney	Martha Melborne	Episode: "Hog Wild"
1974	Cannon	Ava Brannigan	Episode: "Blood Money"
1974	Planet Earth	Marg	Television film
1974	Born Free	Joy Adamson	Main role (13 episodes)
1975	The Rockford Files	Linda Bannister	Episode: "Charlie Harris at Large"
1975	Caribe	Laura Springman	Episode: "Counterfeit Killer"
1975	S.W.A.T.	Kate Darby	Episode: "Terror Ship"
1976	Ellery Queen	Paulette Sherman	Episode: "The Adventure of the Judas Tree"
1976	Bicentennial Minutes	Self - Narrator	1 episode
1976	Charlie's Angels	Rachel LeMaire	Episode: "Charlie's Angels"
1977	Police Woman	Helen Murphy	Episode: "Solitaire"
1977	Hunter	Frieda Scott	Episode: "Mirror Image"
1977	Kingston: Confidential	Eileen Partridge	Episode: "Triple Exposure"
1970-1977	McCloud	Chris Coughlin	15 episodes
1977	The Streets of San Francisco	Judith Winters	Episode: "Dead Lift"
1977	Pine Canyon is Burning	Sandra	Television film
1977	The Deadly Triangle	Edith Cole	Television film
1977	Rosetti and Ryan	Elaine	Episode: "Everybody Into the Pool"
1978	Lucan	Carol Damaree	Episode: "How Do You Run Forever?"
1976-1978	The Tony Randall Show	Judge Eleanor Hooper	6 episodes
1978	The Hardy Boys/Nancy Drew Mysteries	Leta Manheim	Episode: "Sole Survivor"
1978	Carter Country	Ms. Barrington	Episode: "Roy Pays His Taxes"
1978	To Kill a Cop	Florence	Television film
1978	Maneaters Are Loose!	May Purcell	Television film
1968-1978	Insight	Betty, Stella, Mrs. Gleason, Julie Sears	4 episodes
1978	The Word	Claire Randall	4 episodes
1979	Fantasy Island	Mrs. Castle	Episode: "Photographs/Royal Flush"
1979	$weepstake$	Melinda	Episode: "Dewey and Harold and Sarah and Maggie"
1979	The Love Boat	Laura Akers	Episode: "Best of Friends/Aftermath/Dream Boat"
1977-1979	Police Story	Margaret Wilson, Jessica Bentley	2 episodes
1979	Hizzonner	Ginny Linden	7 episodes
1979	Black Beauty	Elizabeth	Episode: "#1.4"
1979	The Miracle Worker	Kate Keller	Television film
1980	B.J. and the Bear	Dr. Nivens	Episode: "Bear Bondage"
1980	The Return of Frank Cannon	Sally Bingham	Television film
1979-1981	The Incredible Hulk	Helen Banner, Sister Anita	2 episodes
1981	Fitz and Bones	Terri Seymour	4 episodes
1980-1981	Quincy, M.E.	Dr. Janet Carlyle	2 episodes
1982	Terror at Alcatraz	Terri Seymour	Television film
1983-1984	Hart to Hart	Claire Beaumond, Janet	2 episodes
1984	The Master	Maggie Sinclair	Episode: "Juggernaut"
1985	Murder, She Wrote	Alexis Post	Episode: "Footnote to Murder"
1986	Murder in Three Acts	Angela Stafford	Television film
1986	A Year in the Life	Dr. Alice Foley	2 episodes
1987-1988	A Year in the Life	Dr. Alice Foley	7 episodes
1988	Hour Magazine	Self	
1988-1989	Star Trek: The Next Generation	Doctor Katherine Pulaski	20 episodes
1989	The Return of Sam McCloud	Chris Coughlin	Television film
1991	Matlock	Judge Diana Levin	Episode: "The Trial"
1989-1991	L.A. Law	Rosalind Shays	24 episodes
1991	Perry Mason: The Case of the Fatal Fashion	Lauren Jeffreys	Television film
1991	Locked Up: A Mother's Rage	Frances	Television film
1992	Hearts Are Wild		Episode: "Pilot"
1992	Empty Nest	Sonya Phillips	Episode: "The Boomerang Affair"
1993	The Legend of Prince Valiant	Lady Morgana (voice)	2 episodes
1992-1993	Batman: The Animated Series	Leslie Thompkins (voice)	5 episodes, including "Perchance to Dream"

== Theater ==
Year	Title	Role	Notes
1962	Seidman and Son	Doreen (Original); Laura Menken (Understudy - Original)	Belasco Theatre; October 15, 1962 - April 20, 1963 (216 performances)
1964	Poor Bitos	Victoire (Lucille Desmoulins) (Original)	Cort Theatre; November 14, 1964 - November 28, 1964 (17 performances)
1965	A Very Rich Woman	Miss Moran (Original)	Belasco Theatre; September 30,1965 - October 23, 1965 (28 performances + 12 performances)

== Awards and nominations ==
Awards
Year	Award	Category	Production	Results
1990	Emmy Awards	Outstanding Supporting Actress in a Drama Series	L.A. Law	Nominated
1991	Emmy Awards	Outstanding Supporting Actress in a Drama Series	L.A. Law	Nominated
1990	Q Award	Best Supporting Actress in a Quality Drama Series	L.A. Law	Nominated
1991	Q Award	Best Supporting Actress in a Quality Drama Series	L.A. Law	Nominated
