= George Adamson =

British wildlife conservationist (1906–1989)

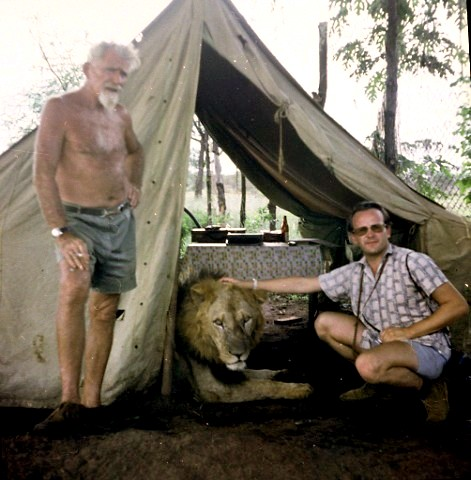
- Adamson (left) in 1968
- Born: George Alexander Graham Adamson; 3 February 1906; Etawah, India
- Died: 20 August 1989 (aged 83); Kora National Park, Coast Province, Kenya
- Cause of death: Murder
- Resting place: Kora National Park
- Other names: Bwana Game, Baba ya Simba
- Occupations: Wildlife conservationist; author
- Spouse: Joy Adamson (m. 1944; sep. 1970)
- Website: www.georgeadamson.org

George Alexander Graham Adamson MBE (3 February 1906 – 20 August 1989), also known as the Baba ya Simba ("Father of Lions" in Swahili), was a British wildlife conservationist and author, based in Kenya. His wife Joy Adamson related in her best-selling book, Born Free (1960) (in 1966 made into a film), the couple's life with Elsa the Lioness, an orphaned cub they raised and later released into the wild.

== Life ==
George Alexander Graham Adamson was born on 3 February 1906 in Etawah, India, to English and Irish parents. He was educated at Dean Close School, Cheltenham, England, and moved to work on his father's coffee plantations in Kenya in 1924. After the death of his parents, he worked in a series of jobs, which included gold prospector, goat trader and professional safari hunter, before joining Kenya's wildlife department in 1938, working as a game warden. Six years later he married Friederike Victoria "Joy" Gessner (who became best-selling author Joy Adamson). In 1956, they began raising the orphaned lioness cub, Elsa. The story of raising and releasing Elsa into the wild became the subject of his wife's best-selling book Born Free (1960), which was made into the feature film Born Free in 1966.

Adamson retired as a Senior Wildlife Warden of the Northern Frontier District Province of Kenya (Meru National Park area) in 1961 and devoted himself to raising lions that could not look after themselves and training them to survive in the wild. In 1970, he moved to the Kora National Reserve in northern Kenya to continue the rehabilitation of captive or orphaned big cats for eventual reintroduction into the wild. George and Joy separated that same year, but continued to spend Christmas holidays together until she was murdered on 3 January 1980.

== Death ==
On 20 August 1989, George Adamson was also murdered near his camp in Kora National Park, by Somali bandits, when he went to the rescue of his assistant and a young European tourist in the Kora National Park. He was 83 years old. George is buried in the Kora National Park next to his brother, Terrance and two lions named Super Cub and Mugie, a lion released in Kora after George's death.

== Film and television ==
- Elsa the Lioness (1961), a documentary introduced and narrated by David Attenborough, it followed the Adamsons as they visited Elsa and her cubs in the wild, shortly before her death, and tended to her injuries following a fight with another lioness.
- Born Free (1966), based on the book of the same name by Joy Adamson about Elsa, who remained in a friendly relationship with the Adamsons after being released in the wild. The film stars Virginia McKenna as Joy Adamson and Bill Travers as George Adamson. George Adamson served as Chief Technical Advisor.
- The Lions Are Free (1967) is a documentary-style film about what happened to the lions Boy, Girl, Ugas, Mara, Henrietta and Little Elsa, and other lions which starred in Born Free. George Adamson rehabilitated many of these lions after Born Free was completed.
- An Elephant Called Slowly (1969) is a travelogue featuring George Adamson, Bill Travers and Virginia McKenna.
- Lord of the Lions...Adamson of Africa was filmed in the Kora Reserve in Kenya only months before George was murdered.
- Living Free (1972) is the sequel to Born Free; it stars Nigel Davenport as George Adamson and Susan Hampshire as Joy Adamson.
- Christian the Lion (1972) is a documentary of Christian the lion and his journey to George Adamson; it was written, produced and directed by Bill Travers and James Hill, the director of Born Free.
- Born Free (1974) is a television series based on a loose adaptation of the book, starring Gary Collins and Diana Muldaur.
- To Walk With Lions (1999), a feature film, starring Richard Harris as George Adamson.
- "The Born Free Legacy" (2010) is a BBC documentary.
- "Elsa's Legacy: The Born Free Story" (2011) is a Nature documentary episode from PBS.

== Bibliography ==
- Bwana Game: The Life Story of George Adamson, Collins & Harvill (April 1968), ISBN 978-0-00-261051-3
- A Lifetime With Lions, Doubleday (1st ed. in the U.S.A.) (1968), ASIN B0006BQAZW
- My Pride and Joy: Autobiography, The Harvill Press (22 September 1986), ISBN 978-0-00-272518-7
