= Born Free (book) =

1960 book by Joy Adamson

- Cover of Born Free
- Author: Joy Adamson
- Publisher: Pantheon Books
- Publication date: 1960
- ISBN: 1-56849-551-X

Born Free is a book by Joy Adamson. Released in 1960 by Pantheon Books, it describes the experiences of Joy and George Adamson raising a lion cub named Elsa. It was translated into several languages, and made into an Academy Award-winning 1966 film of the same name.

The book was re-released in 2017 by Pan Books as part of their Pan 70th anniversary collection, celebrating their best-loved, best-selling stories.
