= Joy Adamson =

Naturalist, artist and author (1910–1980)

- Adamson in 1955
- Born: Friederike Victoria Gessner; 20 January 1910; Troppau, Austrian Silesia, Austria-Hungary (now Opava, Czech Republic)
- Died: 3 January 1980 (aged 69); Shaba National Reserve, Kenya
- Cause of death: Homicide
- Resting place: Meru National Park
- Occupations: Naturalist; Artist; Author
- Spouses: Viktor von Klarwill (m. 1935; div. 1937) Peter René Oscar Bally (m. 1938; div. 1944) George Adamson (m. 1944; sep. 1970)
- Writing career
- Language: English
- Years active: 1960–1980
- Period: 1960–1980
- Genre: Nonfiction
- Subjects: Animals, African culture, nature
- Notable work: Born Free

Friederike Victoria "Joy" Adamson (née Gessner; 20 January 1910 – 3 January 1980) was a Austrian-Kenyan naturalist, artist and author. Her book, Born Free, which describes her experiences raising a lion cub named Elsa, was printed in several languages and made into an Academy Award–winning movie of the same name. In 1977, she was awarded the Austrian Cross of Honour for Science and Art.

== Biography ==
Adamson was born to Victor and Traute Gessner (née Greipel) in Troppau, Silesia, Austria-Hungary (now Opava, Czech Republic), the second of three daughters. Her parents, who were Sudeten Germans, divorced when she was ten, and she went to live with her grandmother in Vienna. In her autobiography, The Searching Spirit, Adamson wrote about her grandmother, saying, "It is to her I owe anything that may be good in me".

Adamson grew up on an estate near Troppau in the village of Kreuzberg (now Kružberk, Czech Republic). With the outbreak of World War I, she moved to Vienna, where she earned a music degree before studying sculpture and medicine. As a young adult, Adamson considered careers as a concert pianist and in medicine.

Adamson married three times in the span of ten years. Her first marriage, in 1935, in Ramsau, Austria, was to Viktor Isidor Ernst "Rufus" Ritter von Klarwill (1902–1984), a Jewish business man. In 1937, due to the rise of the Nazis, he sent his wife to Kenya and soon joined her, but they were divorced there in December of that year.

In Kenya, she met the Swiss botanist Peter Bally, whom she married in 1938. He gave her the nickname "Joy". Bally made botanical paintings, and he encouraged her to continue sketching and painting the flora and fauna in her surroundings. She met her third husband, wildlife warden George Adamson, while on safari in the early 1940s and married him in 1944. They made their home together in Kenya.

In 1956, George Adamson, in the course of his job as game warden of the Northern Frontier District in Kenya, shot and killed a lioness as she charged him and another warden. He later realized the lioness was protecting her cubs, which were found nearby in a rocky crevice. Taking the cubs home, Joy and George found it difficult to care for all the cubs' needs. The two largest cubs, named Big One and Lustica, were passed on to be cared for by a zoo in Rotterdam, and the smallest, Elsa the Lioness, was raised by the couple.

After some time living together, the Adamsons decided to set Elsa free rather than send her to a zoo. They spent many months training her to hunt and survive on her own. Elsa became the first lioness successfully released back into the wild, the first to have contact after release, and the first to have a litter of cubs. The Adamsons kept their distance from the cubs, getting close enough only to photograph them.

In January 1961, Elsa died from babesiosis, a disease resulting from a tick bite. Her three young cubs became a nuisance, killing the livestock of local farmers. The Adamsons, who feared the farmers might kill the cubs, were able to eventually capture and transport them to neighboring Tanganyika Territory, where they were promised a home at Serengeti National Park.

In the concluding part of Forever Free, the Adamsons lose track of the cubs in their new home. After describing a fruitless search, Joy contemplates a pair of lions:

My heart was with them wherever they were. But it was also with these two lions here in front of us; and as I watched this beautiful pair, I realized how all the characteristics of our cubs were inherent in them. Indeed, in every lion I saw during our searches I recognized the intrinsic nature of Elsa, Jespah, Gopa and Little Elsa, the spirit of all the magnificent lions in Africa.

During Elsa's lifetime, the Adamsons needed each other to educate her, but after she died and her cubs were taken in by the park, their interests went in separate directions, as did their lives. While neither wanted a divorce nor a legal separation, their conflicting interests (George wanted to continue to work with lions and she with cheetahs) made it necessary for them to live apart (though they sometimes discussed living together again, they never did). They spent each Christmas together and remained on good terms.

Using her own notes and George's journals, Joy wrote Born Free to tell the Elsa's tale. She submitted it to a number of publishers before it was bought by Harvill Press, part of HarperCollins. Published in 1960, it became a bestseller, spending 13 weeks at the top of The New York Times Best Seller list and nearly a year on the chart overall. The success of the book was due to both the story of Elsa and the dozens of photographs of her. Readers had pictures of many of the events of Elsa's life leading up to her release. Subsequent books were also heavily illustrated. Born Free received largely favorable reviews from critics. Adamson worked closely with publishers to promote the book, which contributed to the Adamsons' new-found international celebrity.

She spent the rest of her life raising money for wildlife, thanks to the popularity of Born Free. The book was followed by Living Free, which is about Elsa as a mother to her cubs; the book was made into a film of the same name. Her next book, Forever Free, tells of the release of the cubs Jespah, Gopa and Little Elsa. Adamson shared book proceeds with various conservation projects.

While television specials kept the Adamsons' cause in the spotlight, Adamson spent her last 10 years travelling the world, giving speeches about the perils faced by wildlife in Africa.

A book of her paintings, Joy Adamson's Africa, was published in 1972. She rehabilitated a cheetah and an African leopard. Pippa the cheetah was raised as a pet and given to Adamson at the age of seven months in hopes that she could also be released. Pippa had four litters before her death. Adamson wrote The Spotted Sphinx and Pippa's Challenge about Pippa and her cheetah family. Later, Adamson reached her goal of many years, when she obtained an African leopard cub. Penny was eight weeks old when a ranger acquaintance of George Adamson found her in 1976. Penny had a litter of two cubs before the publication of Queen of Shaba, Adamson's posthumous and final book.

During her lifetime, she created more than 500 paintings and line drawings. Her work included portraits of indigenous populations commissioned by the government of Kenya, as well as botanical illustrations for at least seven books on East African flora. She also did animal paintings, among them studies of Elsa and Pippa.

== Murder and legacy ==
On 3 January 1980, in Shaba National Reserve in Kenya, Adamson's body was discovered by her assistant, Pieter Mawson. He assumed she had been killed by a lion, and this was what was initially reported by the media. She was a few weeks short of her 70th birthday.

A subsequent police investigation found that Adamson's wounds were too sharp and bloodless to have been caused by an animal, and concluded she had been murdered. Paul Nakware Ekai, a discharged labourer formerly employed by Adamson, was found guilty of murder and sentenced to indefinite imprisonment. He escaped capital punishment because the judge ruled he might have been a minor when the crime was committed.

Adamson was cremated and her ashes were buried in Elsa the Lioness's grave in Meru National Park in Meru, Kenya.

== Bibliography ==
=== Author ===
- Born Free (1960) ISBN 1-56849-551-X
- Elsa: The Story of a Lioness (1961)
- Living Free: The story of Elsa and her cubs (1961) ISBN 0-00-637588-X
- Forever Free: Elsa's Pride (1962) ISBN 0-00-632885-7
- The Spotted Sphinx (1969) ISBN 0-15-184795-9
- Pippa: The Cheetah and her Cubs (1970) ISBN 0-15-262125-3
- Joy Adamson's Africa (1972) ISBN 0-15-146480-4
- Pippa's Challenge (1972) ISBN 0-15-171980-2
- Peoples of Kenya (1975) ISBN 0-15-171681-1
- The Searching Spirit: Joy Adamson's Autobiography. Ulverscroft Large Print Books. 1 July 1982. ISBN 978-0-7089-0826-6. OCLC 4493290.; also, (1978) ISBN 0-00-216035-8
- Queen of Shaba: The Story of an African Leopard (1980) ISBN 0-00-272617-3
- Friends from the Forest (1980) ISBN 0-15-133645-8

=== Illustrator ===
- Gardening in East Africa, II edition
- At least six other books depicting the flowers, trees, and shrubs of East Africa

== Non-fiction books featuring Adamson ==
=== Books by George Adamson ===
- A Lifetime With Lions. (Autobiography). Doubleday,1968. ASIN: B0006BQAZW
- Bwana Game: The Life Story of George Adamson, Collins & Harvill (April 1969), ISBN 978-0-00-261051-3
- My Pride and Joy. (Autobiography). Simon and Schuster. 1987. ISBN 978-0-671-62497-2. OCLC 14586464.; also, The Harvill Press (22 September 1986), ISBN 978-0-00-272518-7

=== Books by others ===
- Wild Heart: The Story of Joy Adamson, Author of Born Free by Anne E. Neimark.
- Sleeping With Lions by Netta Pfeifer
- Joy Adamson : Behind the Mask by Caroline Cass.
- The Great Safari: The Lives of George and Joy Adamson by Adrian House

== Films ==
- Elsa the Lioness (1961), a documentary introduced and narrated by David Attenborough, it followed the Adamsons as they visited Elsa and her cubs in the wild, shortly before her death, and tended to her injuries following a fight with another lioness.
- Born Free
- Living Free
- Elsa & Her Cubs – 25 minutes; Benchmark Films Copyright MCMLXXI by Elsa Wild Animal Appeal and Benchmark Films, Inc.
- Joy Adamson – About the Adamsons – Producer-Benchmark Films, Inc.
- Joy Adamson's Africa (1977) – 86 minutes
- The Joy Adamson Story (1980) – Programme featuring interviews with Adamson about her life and work in Austria and in Africa, and her famous lioness Elsa. Director: Dick Thomsett Production Company: BBC
