= Slate Islands =

Slate Islands may refer to:

- Slate Islands, Scotland, in the council area of Argyll and Bute
- Slate Islands (Ontario), Canada
- Slate Islands (Alaska), United States

== See also ==
- Slate Island in Boston Harbor, Massachusetts, United States
- Slate Islands Heritage Trust
