= Balvicar =

Village in Argyll and Bute, Scotland

Coordinates: 56°17′31″N 05°36′42″W

Balvicar: Scottish Gaelic: Baile a' Bhiocair
- Location within Argyll and Bute
- Population: 112
- Language: English; Scottish Gaelic
- OS grid reference: NM7617
  - Edinburgh: 95 mi (153 km) ESE
  - London: 400 mi (640 km) SE
- Council area: Argyll and Bute
- Lieutenancy area: Argyll and Bute
- Country: Scotland
- Sovereign state: United Kingdom
- Post town: OBAN
- Postcode district: PA34
- Dialling code: 01852
- UK Parliament: Argyll, Bute and South Lochaber
- Scottish Parliament: Argyll and Bute

Balvicar (Scottish Gaelic: Baile a' Bhiocair) is a village on the island of Seil, a small island seven miles (eleven kilometres) southwest of Oban, Scotland. It is one of three villages on the island along with Ellenabeich and Clachan-Seil. It was a former slate-mining village beginning in the 16th century, and eventually ceased mining after sporadic operation between the 1940s and 60s.

Balvicar contains a shop which also serves as a post office. The Isle of Seil Golf Club is also situated in the village. There is a fish factory which processes locally caught langoustines that go for export, and a number of creel fishing boats operate out of Balvicar Bay. There is a boatyard which offers repairs and maintenance for both fishing and pleasure vessels plus winter storage for yachts and small commercial vessels.

As of 2001, 2.68% of people in Balvicar could speak Scottish Gaelic.
