= E. americanus =

E. americanus may refer to:

- Erinus americanus, an ornamental plant species in the genus Erinus
- Esox americanus, a fish species
- Euchirograpsus americanus, a crab species in the genus Euchirograpsus
- Eucosmodon americanus, an extinct mammal species
- Euonymus americanus, a bush species
- Eupeodes americanus, a fly species

== See also ==
- Americanus (disambiguation)
