= Clachan Bridge =

Hump-backed bridge in Argyll, Scotland

Clachan Bridge Dhrochaid thar a' Chuain Sia (Scottish Gaelic)
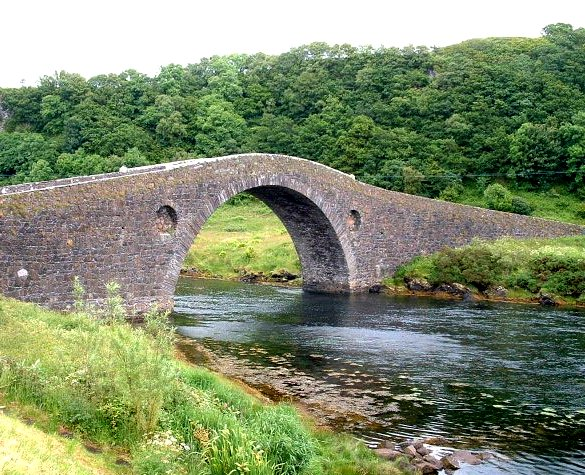
- Bridge in 2004
- Coordinates: 56.31772°N 5.58281°W
- OS grid reference: NM 78517 19700
- Carries: B844
- Locale: Argyll and Bute
- Other name: Bridge over the Atlantic

Characteristics
- Design: Arch
- Material: Stone
- No. of spans: 1

History
- Construction end: 1793

Listed Building – Category A
- Official name: Clachan Bridge, The Atlantic Bridge Sound Of Seil
- Designated: 19 July 1971
- Reference no.: LB11834

Location
- Interactive map of Clachan Bridge

The Clachan Bridge (often, incorrectly, known as the Bridge over the Atlantic) is a simple, single-arched, hump-backed, masonry bridge spanning the Clachan Sound, 13 kilometres (8 mi) southwest of Oban in Argyll and Bute, west of Scotland. It links the west coast of the Scottish mainland to the island of Seil.

The bridge was originally designed by John Stevenson of Oban (and not by Thomas Telford as sometimes quoted) and was built between 1792 and 1793 by engineer Robert Mylne. The original design had two arches, but it was finally built with a single high arch, of roughly 22 metres (72 ft) span and about 12 metres (39 ft) above the bed of the channel, to allow the passage of vessels of up to 40 tonnes (39 long tons) at high tide. The bridge is still in use today, forming part of the B844 road, and is in the care of Historic Scotland.

Even though the Clachan Sound connects only indirectly to the Atlantic Ocean (via the Firth of Lorn to the north and the Seil Sound to the south), some consider it part of that ocean and the bridge has come to be known as the Bridge over the Atlantic (Scottish Gaelic: a' Dhrochaid thar a' Chuain Siar). Such an appellation has also been applied to certain other bridges having similar situations, such as the Brúgvin um Streymin in the Faroe Islands and between Lewis and Great Bernera in the Outer Hebrides.

In 2026, the decision by Argyll and Bute Council to install traffic lights on the approach to the bridge caused a backlash from local residents and councillors, with three times the area's population signing a petition for the lights' removal. Opponents of the scheme said the lights would negatively impact the setting of the bridge, as well as endanger pedestrians using it, as well as bemoaning the council had not adequately consulted before installing the lights.

== Wildlife ==
The south wall of the bridge has been colonised by fairy foxglove (Erinus alpinus).

Occasionally whales have become trapped in the narrow Clachan Sound. In 1835 a whale measuring 24 metres (79 ft) with a lower jaw of 7 metres (23 ft) was stranded having become trapped in shallow water and unable to reverse out. In 1837, 192 pilot whales were caught in a similar fashion, the largest being 8 metres (26 ft) long.

== Gallery ==
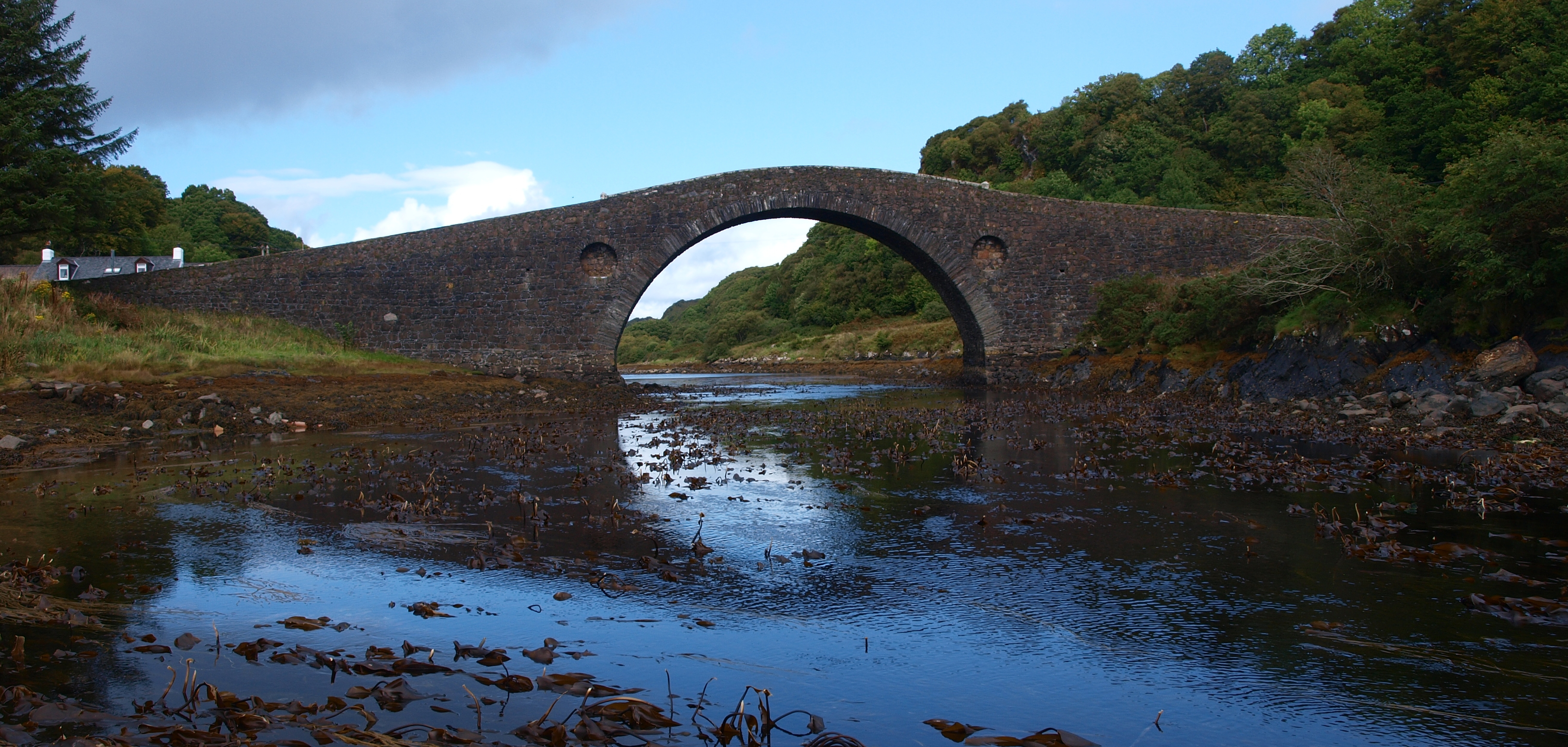
Clachan Bridge

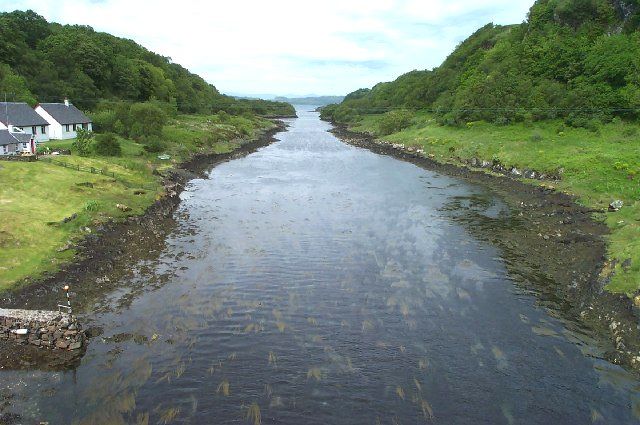
View from the Clachan Bridge, looking north. Seil Island is on the left and the mainland on the right.

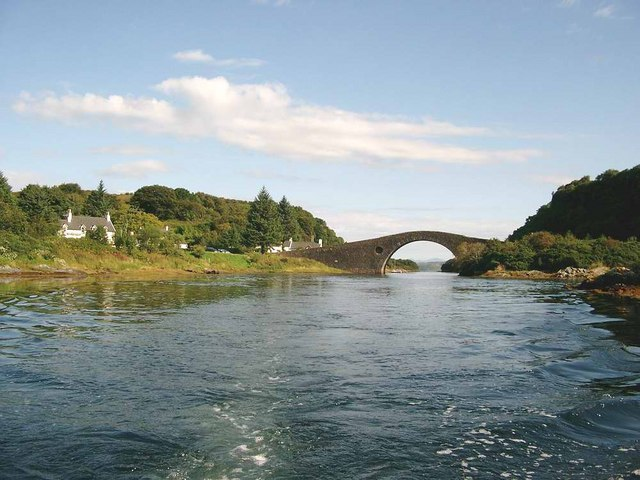
Clachan Bridge

== See also ==
- List of bridges in Scotland
