= Ellenabeich =

Village in Argyll and Bute, Scotland

Coordinates: 56°17′39″N 05°38′52″W

Ellenabeich: Scottish Gaelic: Eilean nam Beitheach
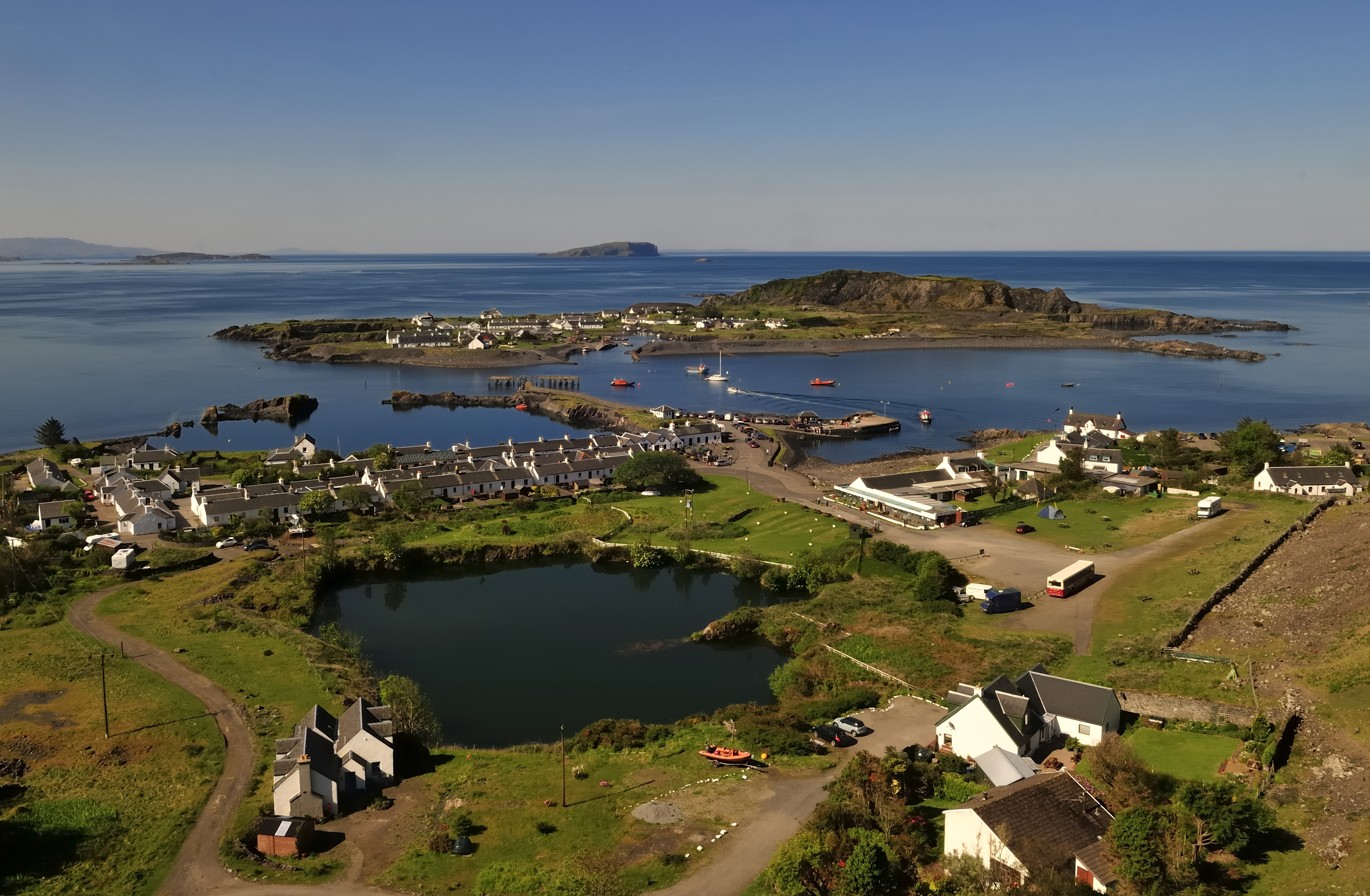
- The village of Ellenabeich with the outline of the former island of Eilean-a-beithich at centre left, the island of Easdale beyond and the Garvellachs in the distance

- Location within Argyll and Bute
- OS grid reference: NM7417
- Council area: Argyll and Bute
- Lieutenancy area: Argyll and Bute
- Country: Scotland
- Sovereign state: United Kingdom
- Post town: OBAN
- Postcode district: PA34
- Police: Scotland
- Fire: Scottish
- Ambulance: Scottish
- UK Parliament: Argyll, Bute and South Lochaber
- Scottish Parliament: Argyll and Bute

Ellenabeich (Scottish Gaelic: Eilean nam Beitheach, meaning "island of the birchwoods.") is a small village on the isle of Seil (Scottish Gaelic: Saoil) – an island on the east side of the Firth of Lorn, 7 miles (11 km) southwest of Oban, in the council area of Argyll and Bute, Scotland. It is a former slate-mining village and is where parts of Ring of Bright Water were filmed. Seil is one of the Slate Islands.

The village gets its name from the former slate island within proximity of the village, called Eilean nam Beitheach. The island was mined out of existence and its name is now the current Scottish Gaelic name of the village.

The village is sometimes called "Easdale" because of its proximity to the island of that name. In the village can be found:

- The Ellenabeich Heritage Centre which was opened in 2000 and is run by the Scottish Slate Islands Heritage Trust. The centre has been created in a former slate quarry-worker's cottage and has 19th century life displays, matters relating to the local dominate industry of slate quarrying as well information relating to the local flora, fauna and the area's geology.
- Highland Arts exhibited the works of the late C. John Taylor, a poet, artist, and composer; it closed in November 2017.

The local slate contains pyrites or "fool's gold". The former slate works' manager's house was a hotel for a number of years, trading as the Easdale Inn; this has now been converted back into a private residence.

A small ferry runs from Ellenabeich to Easdale.

== See also ==
- Balvicar
