= Easdale =

Slate Island in the Firth of Lorn, Scotland

Eilean Èisdeal (Gaelic)

Location
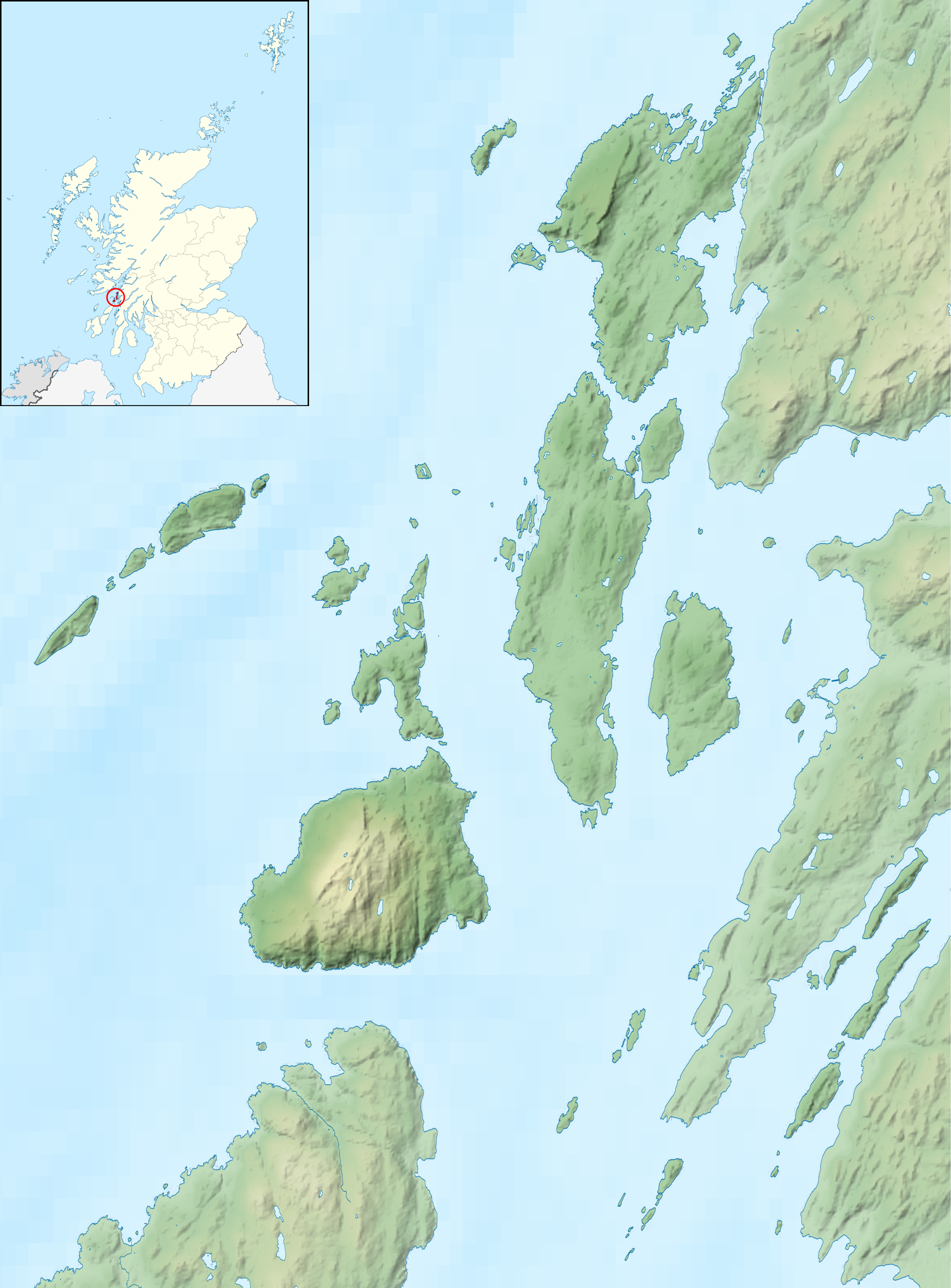
- Easdale shown within the Slate Islands, and next to the Garvellachs, Scarba, and the isles of Loch Craignish Easdale shown within Argyll and Bute
- OS grid reference: NM735172
- Coordinates: 56°17′32″N 5°39′29″W

Name
- Name meaning: Uncertain

Physical geography
- Island group: Slate Islands
- Area: 25 hectares (62 acres)
- Highest elevation: 38 m (125 ft)

Administration
- Council area: Argyll and Bute
- Country: Scotland
- Sovereign state: United Kingdom

Demographics
- Population: 61
- Population rank: 51=
- Population density: 244/km^{2} (630/sq mi)

Easdale (Scottish Gaelic: Eilean Èisdeal) is one of the Slate Islands, in the Firth of Lorn, Scotland. Once the centre of the Scottish slate industry, there has been some recent island regeneration by the owners. This is one of the smallest of the inhabited islands of the Inner Hebrides and is home to traditional white-washed cottages and disused slate quarries. The island has no cars or streetlights.

A ferry sails from Easdale to Ellenabeich on the nearby island of Seil (Gaelic: Saoil), which is separated from Easdale by only a narrow channel. Confusingly, Ellenabeich is sometimes known as 'Easdale' as a result of its connections with the island.

== Etymology ==
In 1549, Donald Monro, "Dean of the Isles" wrote, in brief reference to Easdale, of an island "namit in the Erische Leid Ellan Eisdcalfe" (Note: This quote is from the 1774 Auld version of Monro's Description. In the 17th century Sibbald version the spelling is "Ellan Eisdalf".) However the derivation of "Eisdcalfe" and this word's etymological relationship to "Easdale" is not clear. Haswell-Smith (2004) notes that eas is Gaelic for "waterfall" and dal is Norse for "valley". Nonetheless, it is not clear why either description should apply to the island which is low lying and has no waterfalls. Similarly, Gaelic Place-Names of Scotland states that the first element is obscure, the second is the Norse dalr.

The Gaelic name, Èisdeal ([ˈeːʃtʲəl̪ˠ]) or Eilean Èisdeal has a long vowel and local folk legend attributes this to a derivation from èist thall "listen to that yonder". It is not clear if this Èisdeal shares its derivation with Glen Ashdale/Gleann Èisdeal (Glen of Ash trees) on Arran.

Ellenabeich or Ellenbeich appears to be from the Gaelic Eilean nam Beathach ([ˈelan əm ˈpɛhəx]) "island of the animals" but this may be a reflex of an earlier and homophonous form Eilean nam Beitheach "island of the birch trees".

== Geography and geology ==
1925 Ordnance Survey map of the Firth of Lorn. Easdale is to the north just east of the centre line.

Easdale lies in the Firth of Lorn little more than 200 metres (220 yd) west of the shores of the island of Seil. Mull is some 5 km (3 mi) to the north west. A scattering of islands, large and small, lie to the south, including Luing, Belnahua and the Garvellachs. The highest point on Easdale is only 38 metres above sea level but offers commanding views in all directions.

The Easdale Slates were created in the Ordovician period about 445 million years ago. The rock is blueish-black in colour, contains significant quantities of iron pyrites and features a ripple that distinguishes it from slates found in Wales and Cornwall. The slate beds are tilted at an angle of circa 45 degrees.

== History ==
In the 7th century the Cenél Loairn kindred controlled what is today known as Lorn in the kingdom of Dalriada. It has been suggested that nearby Seil may be the Innisibsolian referred to in the Chronicle of the Kings of Alba, which records a victory of the Scots over a Viking force during the time of Donald II in the 9th century. However, it is likely that Easdale would have become part of the Norse Kingdom of the Isles either at this time or shortly thereafter. Following the 1266 Treaty of Perth the Hebrides were returned to Scottish control and eventually the island became part of the Netherlorn estates of the Breadalbane family (a branch of Clan Campbell).

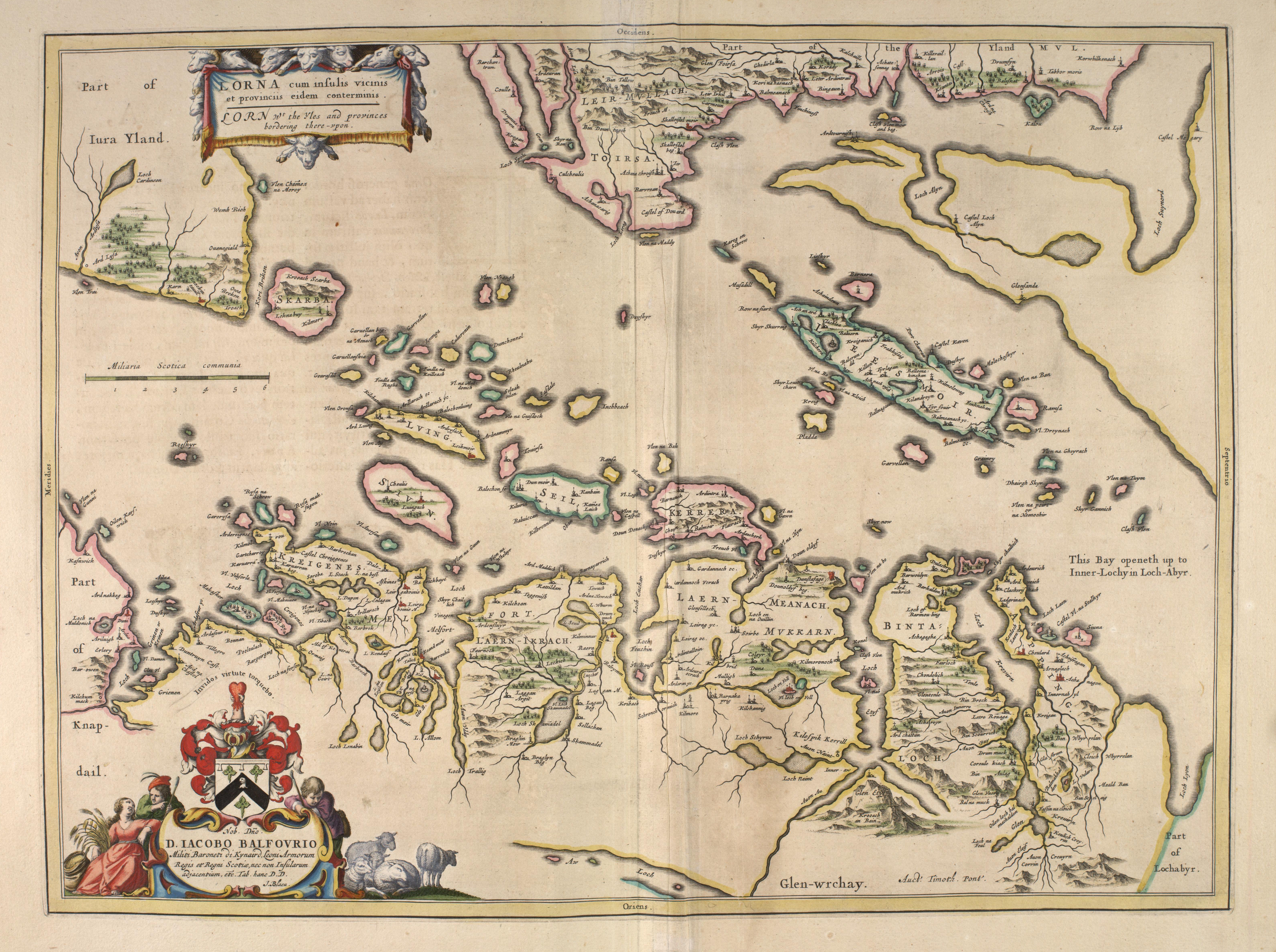
The Firth of Lorn in Blaeu's 1654 Atlas Novus based on Timothy Pont's earlier survey. The positioning of Easdale and surrounding islets is notional. North is at right.

=== Slate mining ===
Easdale slate had been used in major construction projects in Scotland in the 12th and 13th centuries. Another early mention of slate mining in the vicinity also appears in Dean Monro's Description in which he wrote of "Ellan Slait, quhairin their is abundance of skailzie to be wyn". (Note: Translation from Scots in the Sibbald version: "where there is an abundance of slate to be won". Withall believes this to refer to Easdale itself although Munro, following Gilles, lists it as referring to Eilean-a-beithich.) (Note: Withall has Monro as providing the "first recorded account of Easdale slate" in the late sixteenth century but then mentions that it "is known to have been used" in 12th and 13th centuries.)

Production was significantly increased by John Campbell the 1st Earl of Breadalbane following the Jacobite rising of 1689. By the time of the 1772 visit to the area by Thomas Pennant the island was producing 2.5 million slates per annum. Easdale had thus become a centre of the British slate industry, with a community of more than 500 working as many as seven quarries, some of which extended to 90 m (300 ft) below sea level. Easdale slate helped to build major cities of the British Empire and can still be seen on rooftops as far afield as Melbourne, Nova Scotia, Dunedin and Dublin. The great storm of 1850 flooded the majority of the quarries and, as the islanders were unable to extract the floodwater, most were abandoned. The last slate was cut in the 1950s and the once active quarries are now still pools which provide a safe haven for a wide variety of flora and bird life.

Nearby the former island Eilean-a-beithich once stood in the Easdale Sound between Easdale and Seil. It was quarried to a depth of 75 m (250 ft) below sea level leaving only the outer rim of the island. This was breached by the sea in 1881 and little visible sign of the island now remains.

=== Easdale Volunteers ===
In 1859 the British Government decided to create Artillery Volunteers around the coasts to defend the nation from the potential threat of attack by Napoleon III. In Argyll more than a dozen such companies were formed, including two on Easdale created in March 1860. Ex-Royal Navy captain John MacDougall was placed in command of the volunteers and the four 32-pounder guns they were issued with. Drill halls were built at Easdale and at Ellanabeich with the guns being positioned nearby. Drills included firing cannonballs over 120 metres at small target rafts. Further floods in 1881 meant the original gun position on Easdale had to be resited.

In 1899 the 32-pounders were replaced by more powerful 64-pounders that had 3 tonne barrels and which could fire 29kg shells more than twice as far as the original guns. The new guns were mounted on carriages, one of which survives on Easdale. Eight men crewed each gun and in 1903 the Easdale Volunteers won the King's Cup at a national competition held near Dundee. In 1908, 48 years after they were formed, the Volunteers stood down and were replaced by the Territorial Force (now known as the Territorial Army).

=== Recent times ===
By the early 1960s, the population had dwindled to only five people, and the island appeared doomed. The island now [when?] has a population of around sixty-seventy people and is one of the smallest permanently inhabited islands of the Inner Hebrides. (Note: Easdale was the smallest inhabited island in this archipelago in 2001 if bridged and tidal islands were excluded. Eilean Bàn, which is part of the Skye Bridge and Eilean Donan, which is tidal, were both inhabited at the time of the 2000 Census and smaller. By the time of the 2022 census several other smaller islands were recorded as inhabited: Eilean Tioram, Badachro; Eilean dà Mhèinn, Loch Crinan; Eilean Loain, Loch Sween.) The Scottish plant collector Clara Winsome Muirhead surveyed the plant life of the island and published The Flora of Easdale and the Garvellachs in 1967.

British indie rock band Florence and the Machine filmed their double-feature music video for their singles "Queen of Peace" and "Long & Lost" on the island, with the videos using the villagers as the cast.

The island is owned by Jonathan Feigenbaum, who operates the Easdale Island Company; he succeeded his late father Clive Feigenbaum (the former chairman of Stanley Gibbons). Clive created local issues of stamps, and Jonathan has continued doing this.

In 2005 the local authority, Argyll and Bute Council, discussed plans to build a bridge between the island and Seil, linking the island to the mainland by road, despite there being no roads on Easdale.

== Facilities and activities ==
The island is home to a museum owned and operated by Eilean Eisdeal, a development trust. Eilean Eisdeal spearheaded the renovation of the Easdale Island Community Hall, which provides a venue for a wide variety of events. According to Mike Scott of the Waterboys: "The Hall itself is magical. From the first sighting of its pyramid roof and arced frontispiece across the water to stepping off its stage at the end of the concert, it cast a spell on us."

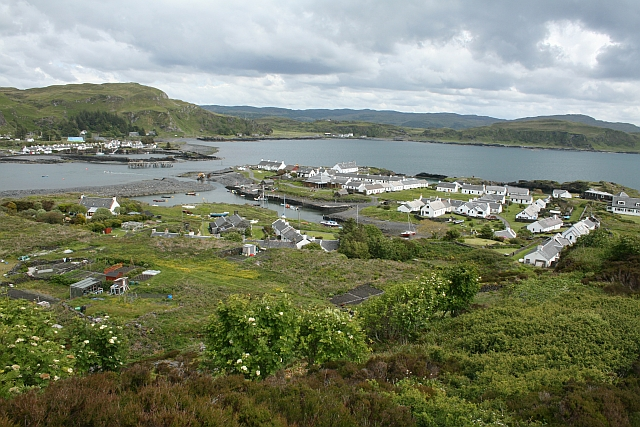
Easdale harbour with Ellenabeich and Seil beyond

The World Stone Skimming Championship has taken place annually in September on Easdale since 1997. In 2012 the event came under threat after Jonathan Feigenbaum requested £1,000 for using the slate quarry the championship uses. The competition only went ahead after the Press and Journal newspaper offered to pay the fee. A community buyout of the island by residents is now under consideration. Mike Russell, MSP for Argyll and Bute, said: "Not every community will achieve it and not every community should achieve it. But it is a live issue and becomes even more live in circumstances such as these."

Tourist accommodation is available on the island and nearby. The disused quarries have been described as "perfect for wild swimming".

== See also ==
- List of islands of Scotland
