= Eilean-a-beithich =

Island in Argyll and Bute, Scotland

Eilean-a-beithich or Eilean nam Beitheach ("island of the birches") was once one of the Slate Islands, located in Easdale Sound between Easdale and Seil, in the Inner Hebrides.

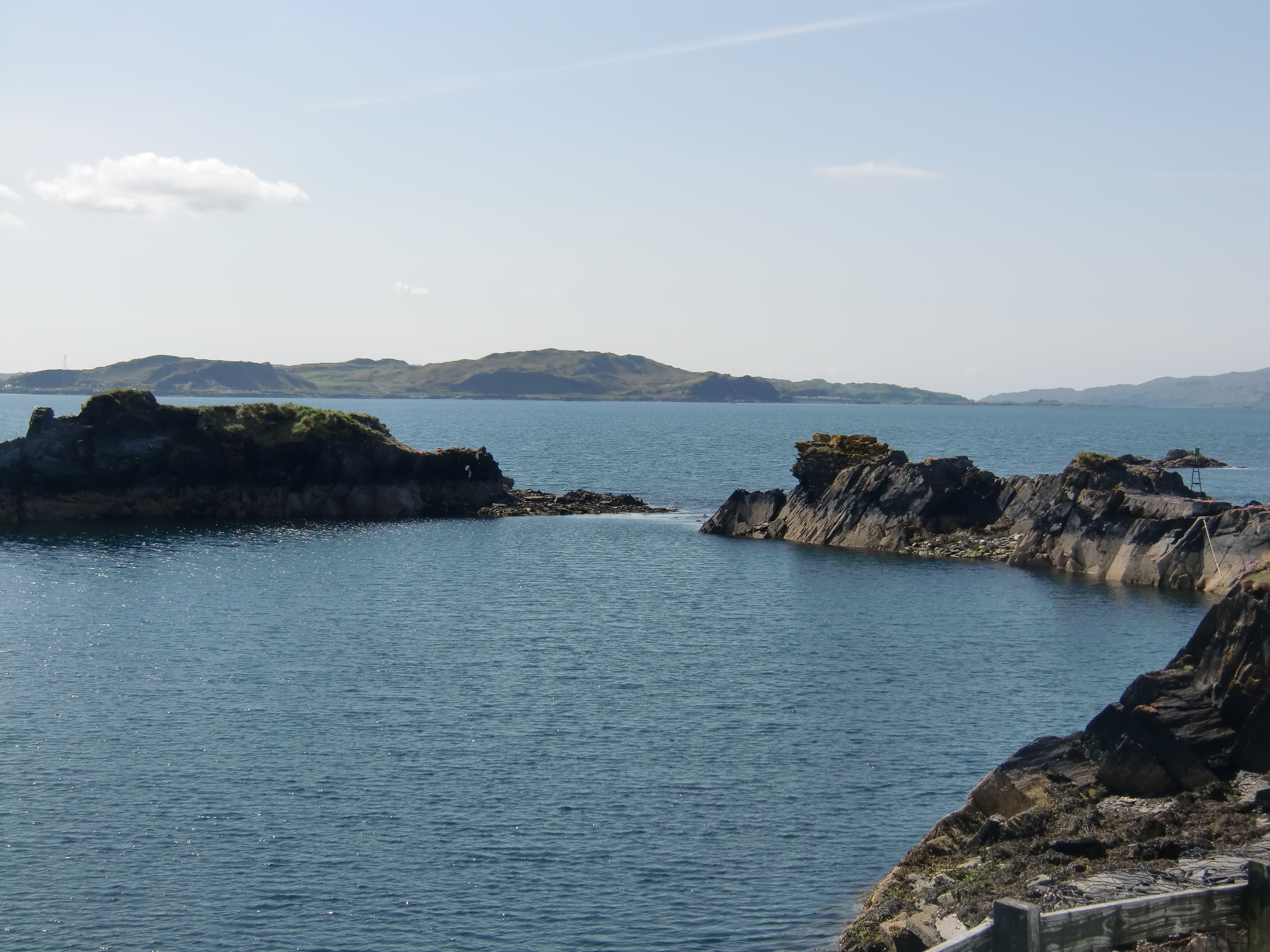
The southern rim of the quarry showing the breach.

In 1549, Dean Monro wrote: "Narrest Seunay layes ther a litle iyle, callit in Erische Leid Ellan Sklaitt, quherein ther is abundance of skalzie to be win". In modern English: "Nearest to Shuna there lies a little isle, called Eilean Sklaitt in Gaelic where there is an abundance of slate to be gained." (Note: There are several different versions of Monro's Description. This quote is from the 1774 Auld version. In the Sibbald version of 1682 the island is called "Ellan Slait".)

Originally about 1 hectare (2.5 acres) in area the island was quarried for its slate to a depth of 76 metres (249 ft) below sea level leaving only the outer rim of the island. Tipping of the quarry detritus eventually filled up the channel which separated Eilean-a-beithich from Seil, and the slate-mining village of Ellenabeich began to grow up there. However, the quarry came to a sudden and catastrophic end. "In the early morning of the 22nd November 1881, after a very severe gale of south-west wind followed by an exceptionally high tide, a large rocky buttress which supported a sea wall gave way under the excessive pressure of water".

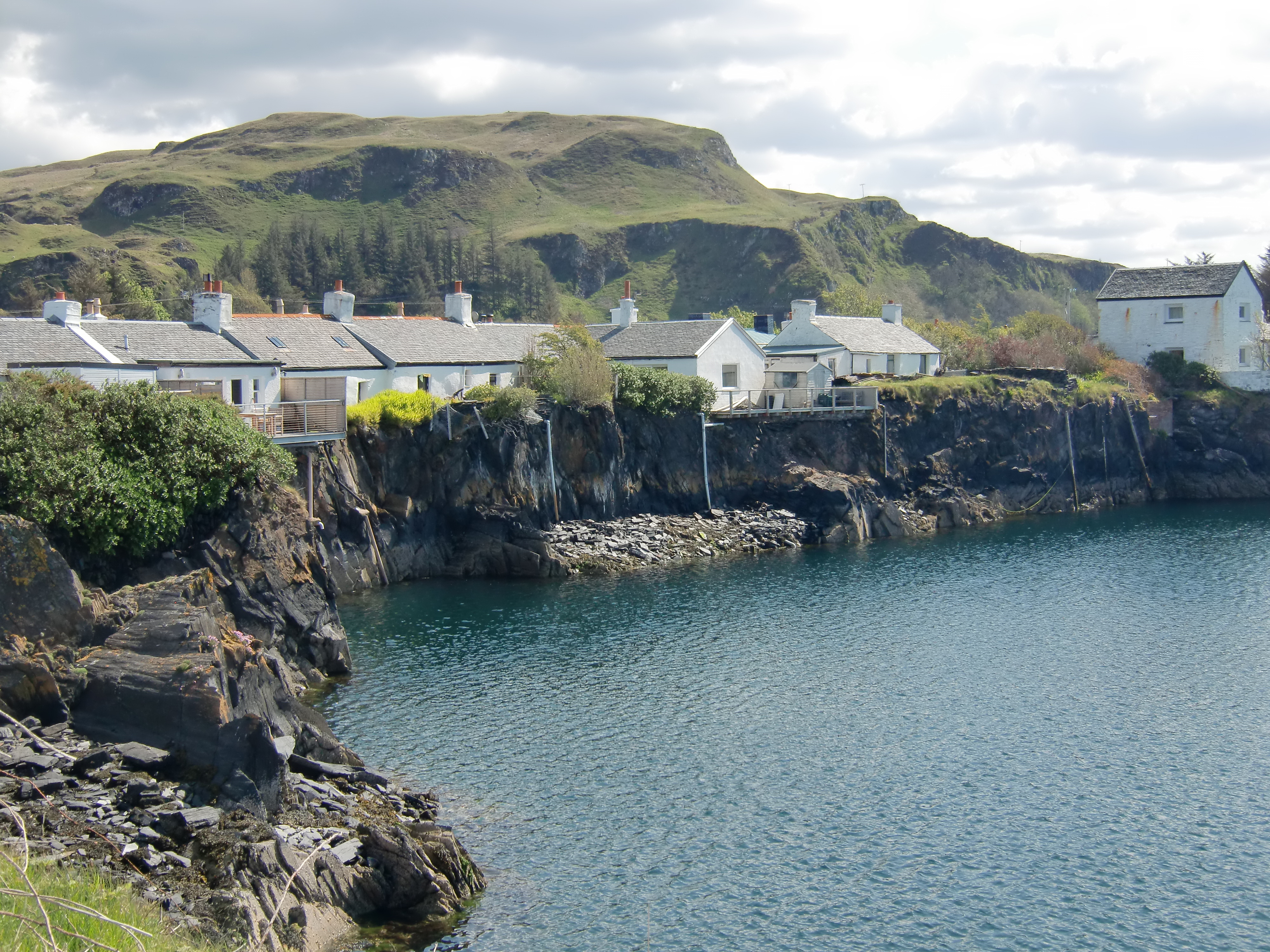
Cottages in the village of Ellenabeich perched on the inner rim of the flooded quarry.

The quarry had been immensely productive and of high quality, and may have been the richest workings in the Slate Islands. An estimated seven to nine million slates had been manufactured annually over a protracted periods and after the flooding of the workings two hundred and forty men and boys lost their jobs. The outer rim of the island now forms a harbour on the edge of the village and is the only sign of the island that now remains.

Notes

Citations

General references

- Gillies, Patrick Hunter (1909) Netherlorn, Argyllshire, and its neighbourhood. London. Virtue and Co.
- Munro, R. W. (1961). Monro's Western Isles of Scotland and Genealogies of the Clans. Edinburgh and London: Oliver and Boyd.
- Monro, Donald (1774) [Composed 1549, first published 1582]. "A Description of the Western Isles of Scotland, Called Hybrides". A Description of the Western Isles of Scotland, Called Hybrides (and other works). Edinburgh: William Auld.
