= Slate Islands (Alaska) =

Group of islands in Alaska, United States

Coordinates: 55°5′17″N 131°3′10″W

The Slate Islands are a group of four small uninhabited islands in Ketchikan Gateway Borough, Alaska, in the Inside Passage near the south end of the Alaska Panhandle, at the mouth of the Boca de Quadra, in Revillagigedo Channel (directly south of Revillagigedo Island), which connects to Dixon Entrance) and about a mile offshore of the Alaskan mainland. They are part of Misty Fjords National Monument. The nearest inhabited place, Metlakatla, is 21 miles distant.

The largest island of the group is about 800 feet (240 m) long. The islands were named (as "Slate Islet" at the time) in 1793 by Captain George Vancouver, who described them as being entirely composed of slate. The islands are completely forested, and there are no docks, trails, or any other amenities.

The three smaller islets are almost connected at low tide, and various rocks also break the surface in the area. Slate Islands Light, at the southern end of the southern, larger island, stands 33 feet (10 m) above the water.
