= Slate Islands Heritage Trust =

Scottish charitable organisation

The Slate Islands Heritage Trust is a charity formed in 1999. Its objective is advancing the education of the public on matters relating to the life and times of the people of the Scottish Slate Islands. It states its objectives are " ....to promote conservation of the built, natural and cultural heritage of the Slate Islands".

== Mission ==
The Trust collects and publishes information regarding the area of the Slate Islands; it also records and researches information regarding the areas former industries as well as information relating to the architecture and sociology of the area. It also seeks to preserve and protect documents, records, artifacts in order to both preserve and protect them but also to make them available to members of the public.

The trust ensures that the majority of visitors to the village should have an understanding of the village origins and the industry that formed it. The trust also ensures that everyone in the community has access to the research and findings that informed the interpretation material, and learns something of the slate industry within the parish.

The Trust runs The Ellenabeich Heritage Centre in Ellenabeich, which was opened in 2000. The centre has been created in a former slate quarry-worker's cottage and has 19th century life displays, matters relating to the local dominate industry of slate quarrying as well information relating to the local flora, fauna and the area's geology. The Ellenabeich Heritage Centre is run in close association with the museum on the neighbouring island of Easdale.
