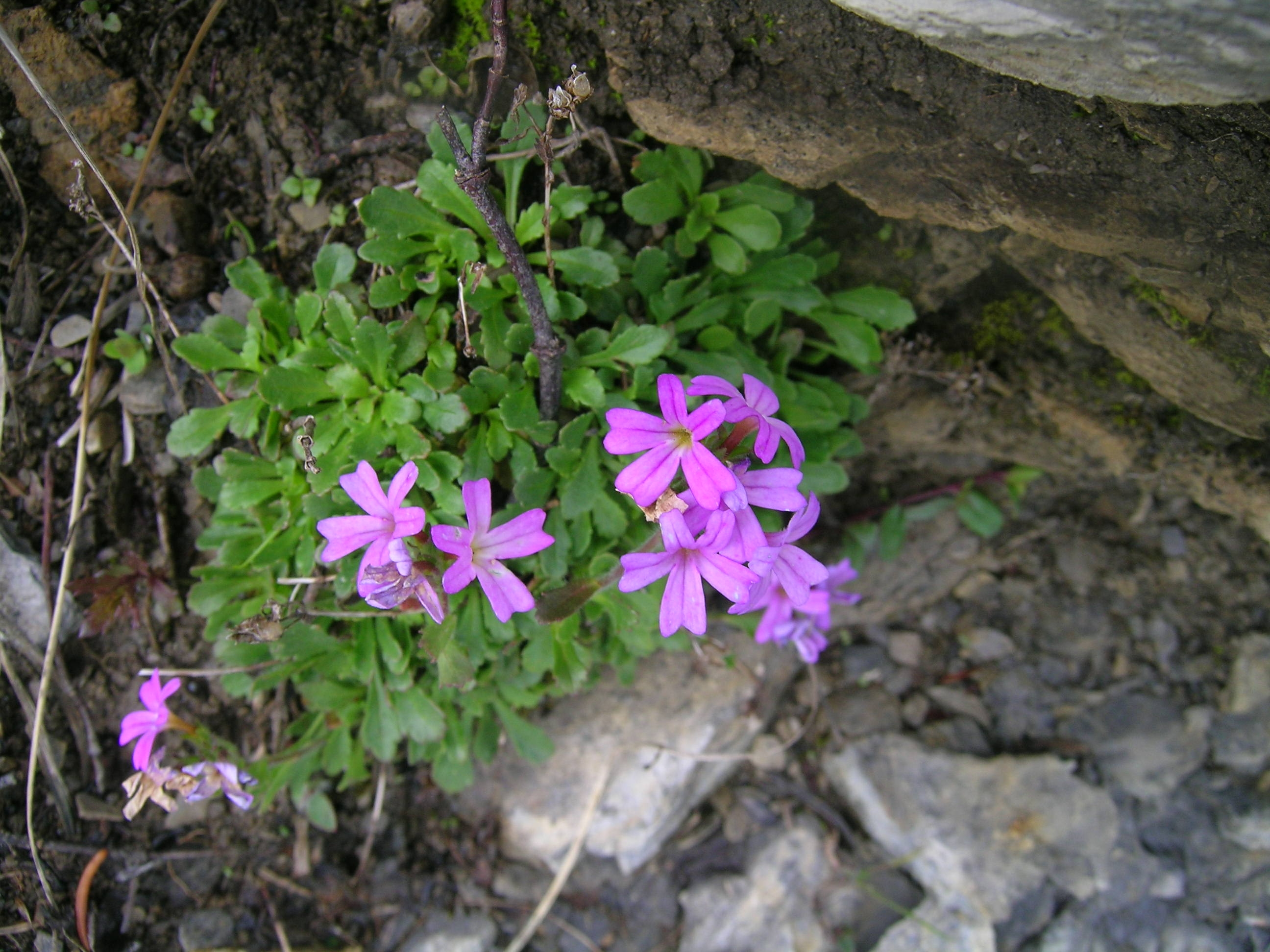
- Erinus alpinus

Scientific classification
- Kingdom: Plantae
- Clade: Tracheophytes
- Clade: Angiosperms
- Clade: Eudicots
- Clade: Asterids
- Order: Lamiales
- Family: Plantaginaceae
- Tribe: Digitalideae
- Genus: Erinus; L.

Species
- Erinus alpinus; Erinus thiabaudii

= Erinus =

Genus of flowering plants

Erinus is a genus of flowering plants in the family Plantaginaceae (previously in the family Scrophulariaceae), native to stony mountainous sites in North Africa and southern Europe. Some members of the genus have been cultivated as ornamental plants, particularly Erinus alpinus, for which a number of different cultivars are available.

== Species ==
- Erinus alpinus
- Erinus thiabaudii
