= 1850 Atlantic hurricane season =

The 1850 Atlantic hurricane season was the last season excluded from the scope of the official Atlantic hurricane database. Although meteorological records are sparse and generally incomplete, they indicate that three significant tropical cyclones affected land, each causing some degree of damage. The first system struck North Carolina on July 18, causing significant damage before battering the Mid-Atlantic states with high tides, strong winds, and heavy rainfall. Torrential rainfall caused river flooding from Baltimore to Philadelphia, particularly along the Schuylkill River, which took the lives of 20 people in various incidents. Strong winds damaged property and public facilities in and around New York City, and damaging floods extended into central and northern New England. Crops and railroad infrastructure suffered throughout the entire region.

On August 22, a strong hurricane impacted Havana, Cuba, destroying fruit trees and disrupting shipping, before making landfall on the Florida Panhandle with an enormous storm surge. Coastal flooding was severe around Apalachicola, and as the storm moved inland, it generated destructive winds across the Southeastern United States. Abundant precipitation fell from Georgia through Virginia, causing extensive flooding; one river swelled over 20 feet (6.1 m) above its normal height. The storm blew down crops and trees along its course, and toppled a large railroad bridge near Halifax, North Carolina. Offshore, a pilot boat collided with a larger ship in the rough seas and sank. Considered the worst storm in nearly 30 years in the tidewater region of Virginia, the cyclone briefly reentered the Atlantic off New Jersey before making landfall over New England. Strong winds and moderate to heavy rains plagued much of New England on August 24 and 25.

On September 7 and 8, a hurricane brushed the coastline from New York to Cape Cod with gusty winds and appreciable rainfall, and left many ships in distress. The system later struck Atlantic Canada, likely causing "great loss of property and lives", though damage reports were limited. Fragmented records exist of other hurricanes, including two which remained over open seas in early September and the middle of October.

== Background ==
Attempts to catalog Atlantic hurricanes in the first half of the 19th century began as early as 1855, when Andrés Poey compiled information on just over 400 tropical cyclones from 1493 to 1855. However, Poey listed only three of the five or more hurricanes that developed in 1850. In his 1963 book, Early American Hurricanes, 1492–1870, weather researcher David M. Ludlum discusses, in greater detail, three significant tropical cyclones that affected the United States in 1850. Unusually, all three heavily affected the Northeastern United States; Ludlum compares the season to 1954, in which three major tropical systems affected the East Coast of the United States. More traditional hurricane targets, such as Florida, were spared the brunt of seasonal tropical cyclone activity in 1850, while the atmosphere farther north was abnormally tropical. Newark, New Jersey, had its warmest—and one of its rainiest—summer on record at the time, owing to frequent nearby hurricanes and the influx of tropical air. Meteorological reports pertaining to the season were largely lost in a Smithsonian Institution fire in 1856, limiting what is known about hurricane activity in 1850. As the season falls outside the scope of the Atlantic hurricane database (1851 onward) and its associated reanalysis project, records are regarded as incomplete. Extant accounts of the storms in 1850 are chiefly based on private weather records and press reports, and only approximate storm tracks are known.

== Storms ==
=== Tropical Storm One ===
A strong squall swept across Matagorda Bay in southeastern Texas on June 27. High winds ripped a ship from its anchor and drove it aground, and at least one other vessel suffered structural damage. Although it is included in the Weather Prediction Center's publication, Texas Hurricane History, little is known about the nature of the storm.

=== Hurricane Two ===
The first documented hurricane in 1850 originated in the Caribbean Sea, where it wrecked dozens of ships along the Windward Islands on July 11 and 12. On July 18, the storm struck North Carolina from the south as a hurricane of at least Category 1 intensity (on the modern-day Saffir–Simpson hurricane wind scale) and proceeded northward. Although the exact point of landfall is unknown, the system is believed to have moved ashore south of Cape Hatteras. Ships just off the state's coast battled three days of hurricane conditions from July 15 to July 18. Onshore, "great damage" occurred from Wilmington to Elizabeth City.

Intense wave action churned the Chesapeake Bay, while storm-heightened tides up to 6 ft (1.8 m) above normal flooded wharves and coastal communities. The Baltimore area endured persistent gale-force winds accompanied by torrential rainfall. As streams and rivers swelled above their banks, cellars and streets became inundated by floodwaters. Many trees were blown down and numerous poorly built or unfinished buildings were destroyed. The storm cut telegraph communications between Baltimore and surrounding areas. In the countryside, low-lying hay fields were flooded and most of the corn crop was decimated. At Bladensburg, Maryland, a train station and locomotive were washed into an adjacent flooded waterway. Arrivals of ships into port were delayed by the storm, which one captain held to be the worst he had ever observed, and some vessels incurred extensive damage.

The storm's effects quickly spread northward. Winds at Philadelphia began to increase in the morning on July 18, becoming severe by the evening hours. Air pressure fell to 993 millibars (29.3 inHg) early on July 19 as the hurricane's center passed to the west, and the city received more than 4 inches (100 mm) of rainfall. The storm wrought significant damage throughout the city, including to trees, signs, and structures. A number of houses were demolished, and many more—including a large brick building near Rittenhouse Square—suffered damage. Major freshwater flooding was observed in the area, especially along the Schuylkill River, which rapidly rose to its highest level since 1838. A large quantity of lumber was swept away, and several docks were submerged. Their "worst apprehensions realized", hundreds of residents worked hurriedly to mitigate damage from the flooding. Bridges over the river at Phoenixville were washed away, resulting in the deaths of four individuals. A lock of a dam upstream of Phoenixville gave way, destroying a boat and killing its occupants. Four men and a child reportedly drowned on the river's banks near Conshohocken. Railways were covered with up to 3 feet of water in low-lying spots. Numerous small craft capsized on the Schuylkill and Delaware rivers. Overall, 20 people died in various storm-related tragedies along the Schuylkill.

The hurricane took a heavy toll on agriculture in the Mid-Atlantic states. Flooding outside Philadelphia destroyed fruit orchards, and in nearby Burlington, New Jersey, strong winds and heavy rainfall inflicted significant damage to crops on the night of July 18, leaving entire fields of corn blown down. The Delaware River burst its banks at Burlington, inundating nearby lowlands. Notable flooding also took place along the Lehigh River. Telegraph lines north of Philadelphia were damaged, limiting communications in the storm's aftermath. Throughout the region, downed trees blocked railways.

"The parks are literally carpeted with boughs and leaves, and many beautiful trees are prostrate."

— The Brooklyn Daily Eagle, July 19, 1850

Hurricane-force gusts buffeted Newark, New Jersey, and rainfall exceeded a weather observer's rain gauge capacity of 4.75 in (121 mm). Strong winds imperiled New York City late on July 18 into the next morning; there was widespread tree damage, with branches and leaves littering the ground, and many specimens uprooted or snapped. The storm ruined awnings and tore metal roofs off several buildings. Some ships in New York Harbor were ripped from their anchors and blown aground; further east, multiple coaster vessels were wrecked along the coast of Long Island. The winds and storm tides destroyed bath houses and other facilities at Coney Island.

As the storm tracked northward through central New York State, it produced high southeasterly winds and heavy rainfall across most of New England. At Fort Trumbull along the coast of Connecticut, heavy rainfall starting early on July 19 accumulated to 3.24 in (82 mm). At Hartford, flooding caused about $100,000 (1850 USD) in losses. Southeasterly winds peaked at tropical storm-force. Damage to property and crops was confined to western New England, leaving areas such as eastern Massachusetts unscathed. Less substantial rain was reported at Providence, amounting to 1 in (25 mm). The rain shield extended into far-northern New England, producing 5 in (130 mm) of precipitation at Montpelier, Vermont, and 3.23 in (82 mm) at Burlington. The resultant flooding was in some cases the greatest in recent memory.

=== Hurricane Three ===
A tropical system first observed near Barbados on August 16 proceeded to affect the Windward Islands before strengthening to hurricane conditions at Ponce, Puerto Rico, on August 20. Two days later, the hurricane tracked over western Cuba, causing severe weather conditions around Havana. The storm destroyed large swaths of banana and plantain trees, and all vessels in Havana Harbor dragged anchors at the height of the hurricane.

The storm moved north over the eastern Gulf of Mexico, striking the Florida Panhandle between Pensacola and Panama City on August 23. Extremely high tides bombarded the Apalachicola area, resulting in extensive coastal flooding. The hurricane destroyed wharves and left many ships damaged or foundered. Sea water intrusion inundated warehouses and streets in Apalachicola, and one street was made impassable by strewn debris and fallen trees. Farther east, a bridge over the Wakulla River was washed away by raging floodwaters. A long period of high winds was reported at the state's capital city of Tallahassee. The storm produced some strong winds in interior Georgia on its way to the Carolinas. The destruction of homes, crops, and trees was reported from Griffin through Augusta, Georgia. Adverse conditions extended westward to Montgomery, Alabama, where the night of August 23 was marked by high winds and heavy rainfall.

Southeasterly gales had a large impact on shipping interests off North Carolina. Several vessels were imperiled; in one case a pilot boat capsized after colliding with another ship. In light of this incident, the hurricane is listed in the National Hurricane Center's contemporary compilation of tropical cyclones that "may have" caused at least 25 fatalities. The storm grounded the schooner H. Wescott near Cape Fear.

Gales were reported from Savannah, Georgia, to Wilmington, North Carolina. Near Halifax, North Carolina, the winds toppled a railroad bridge about 450 ft (140 m) long and 60 ft (18 m) high. The storm also ravaged farmland in the area, destroying crops, fences, trees, and structures, and injuring several people. Much damage was reported in the Raleigh area, and many trees in New Bern suffered at least some limb breakage; several large trees were fully uprooted. The local corn crop—already diminished from the July hurricane—was judged completely lost, though property damage was negligible. Offshore winds from the storm created a negative storm surge on the Neuse River, leaving docks dry for a time. Torrential rains over a large area from Georgia to Virginia triggered severe river flooding. The Dan River, which flows through North Carolina and Virginia, swelled 20 ft (6.1 m), amplified to 40 ft (12 m) above normal in narrow channels. In the Carolinas, mills, dams, and roads were washed out, and losses in central North Carolina alone totaled an estimated $7 million.

Gale-force winds lashed the tidewater region of Virginia in what was considered the worst storm on the lower Chesapeake Bay since the 1821 Norfolk and Long Island hurricane. A ship called the Osceola lost its wheelhouse to the winds, while onshore, the storm razed crops and a few small structures such as barns and outhouses. Affecting many of the same areas as the July hurricane, the cyclone downed trees in and around Baltimore and caused street flooding in Washington, D.C., where a railroad bridge was swept away. The storm began to influence the weather at Philadelphia on the night of August 24. Strong winds out of the north and northeast at Philadelphia and Newark, New Jersey, suggest the center moved off the New Jersey coast and reemerged into the Atlantic. In addition to the gales, more than 3 in (76 mm) of rain fell on Newark on August 25.

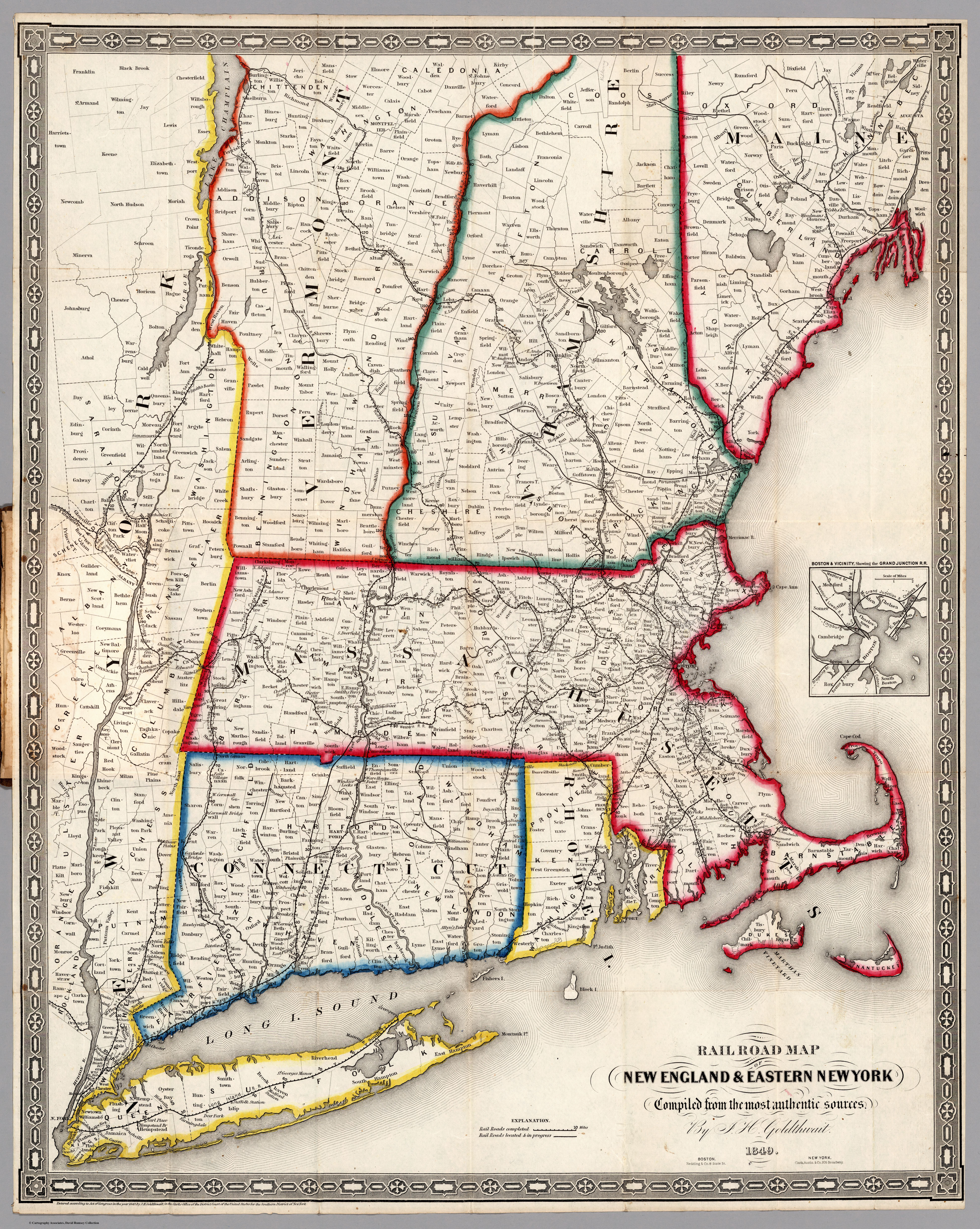
1849 railroad map of New England—click to enlarge

Winds at New London, Connecticut, and Providence, Rhode Island, veered from southeast to south, then west, so the storm center likely tracked somewhere over Connecticut. The storm adversely affected shipping on the Long Island Sound, and heavy rain fell across much of New England. Fort Trumbull recorded 4.43 in (113 mm) of rain, while 2.5 in (64 mm) fell at Providence; the deluge triggered flash flooding, though few details are known about the extent of the damage.

=== Hurricane Four ===
Shipping data indicates a hurricane formed near Cape Verde on September 2 and tracked northward into the northeastern Atlantic over the next week. Andrés Poey listed this system as two distinct cyclones, later confirmed by Chenoweth (2006) to be a single storm.

=== Hurricane Five ===
A widely documented hurricane to affect the U.S. East Coast in 1850 remained predominately offshore, but still impacted ships and coastal cities on September 7 and 8. A vessel about 140 mi (230 km) east of Atlantic City, New Jersey, intercepted the hurricane's center and recorded a pressure of 988 mbar (29.2 inHg) on the night of September 7. Numerous ships near the Delaware coast were stricken. Gusty winds snapped tree branches in New York City, while Newark received 2.6 in (66 mm) of rain as the hurricane brushed the region. The system probably continued toward the northeast, passing south of Nantucket, Massachusetts. There, gale-force winds initially blew out of the southeast before shifting to north midday on September 8. Similarly, Cape Cod experienced blustery conditions accompanied by heavy rainfall, though damage in eastern New England was generally inconsequential. Providence, Rhode Island, received 2 in (51 mm) of rain.

The storm later affected the Canadian Maritimes, causing heavy disruption in Nova Scotia. Downed telegraph wires in the region delayed damage reports until repairs were completed. The cyclone "undoubtedly caused great loss of property and lives along the coast", according to a report from the telegraph office at Halifax.

=== Hurricane Six ===
A final hurricane is believed to have existed over the central Atlantic in mid-October, moving from near 24.5°N, 47°W to 25.5°N, 41°W over the course of four days.

== See also ==
- List of Florida hurricanes (pre-1900)
- List of New England hurricanes
- List of New Jersey hurricanes
- List of New York hurricanes
- List of North Carolina hurricanes
- 1840s Atlantic hurricane seasons
