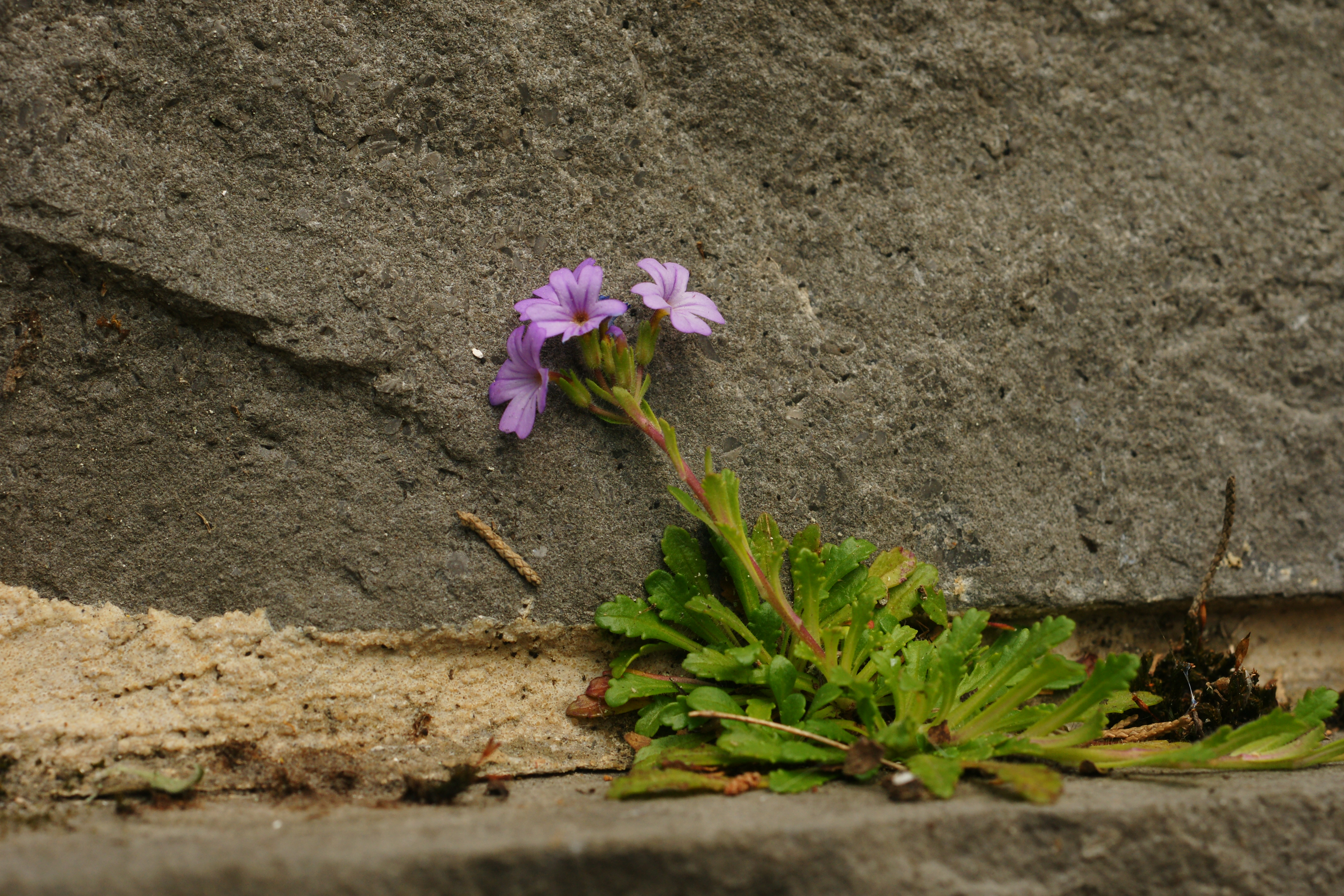
- Erinus alpinus flowering in a crack in mortar

Scientific classification
- Kingdom: Plantae
- Clade: Tracheophytes
- Clade: Angiosperms
- Clade: Eudicots
- Clade: Asterids
- Order: Lamiales
- Family: Plantaginaceae
- Genus: Erinus
- Species: E. alpinus

Binomial name
- Erinus alpinus L.

= Erinus alpinus =

Species of flowering plant

Erinus alpinus, the fairy foxglove, alpine balsam, starflower, or liver balsam, is a species of flowering plant in the family Plantaginaceae (previously in the family Scrophulariaceae), native to Central and Southern Europe and also to Morocco and Algeria.

== Description ==
Erinus alpinus is a semi-evergreen, perennial chasmophyte with 10 cm (4 in) stems of narrow blue-green leaves and clusters of rose-pink flowers at the tips in spring and summer.

== Habitat ==
It prefers rocky slopes and lime. It is native to Central and Southern Europe, and also to Morocco and Algeria.

It is popularly grown in rockeries or alpine gardens; and occasionally becomes naturalised outside its native range, especially on old stone walls, shown from a well-known location for this species on the old Carrbridge Packhorse Bridge in the Highlands of Scotland

It has gained the Royal Horticultural Society's Award of Garden Merit.

== In folk belief of Northumberland ==
Botanist and noted authority on plant-lore Albert Roy Vickery quotes an informant from the town of Hexham thus:

Fairy foxglove is a small, purple flower which grows intermittently on stone walls in north-east England. Local tradition says that it only grows where Roman soldiers have trod. And certainly it is to be found in the village of Wall (which is, of course, located near Hadrian's Wall in Northumberland).

== Gallery ==
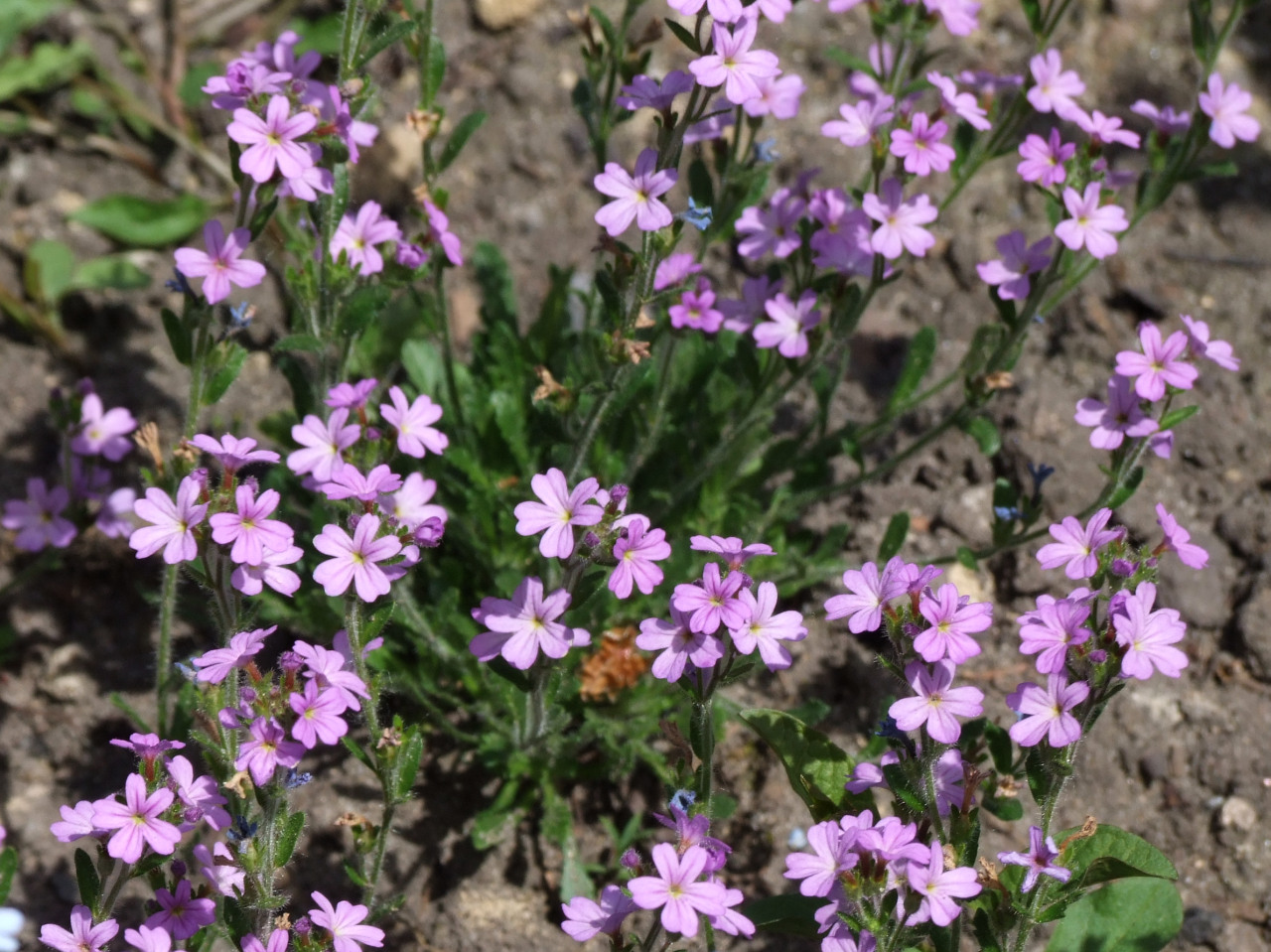

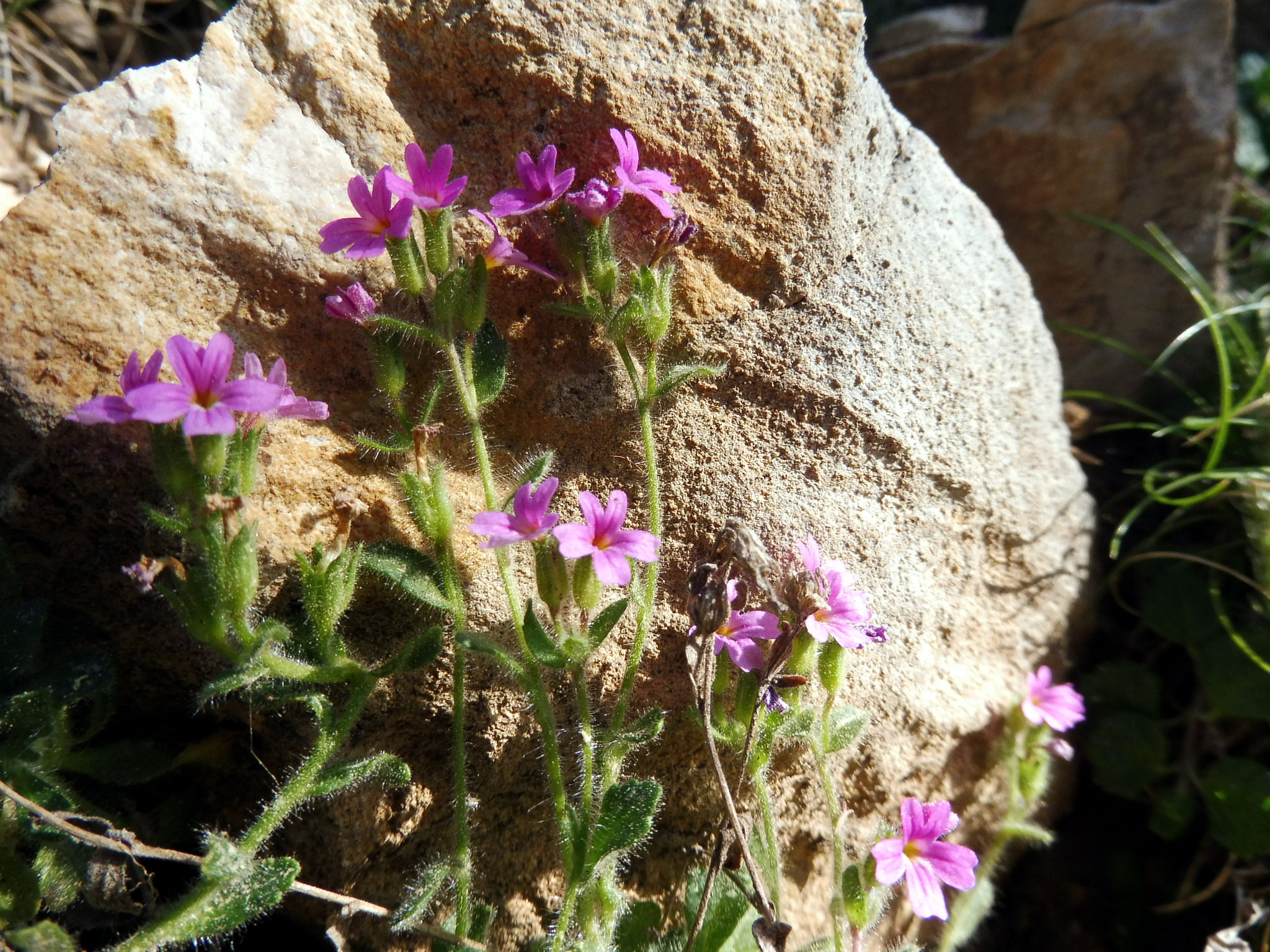
Solsonès, Catalonia

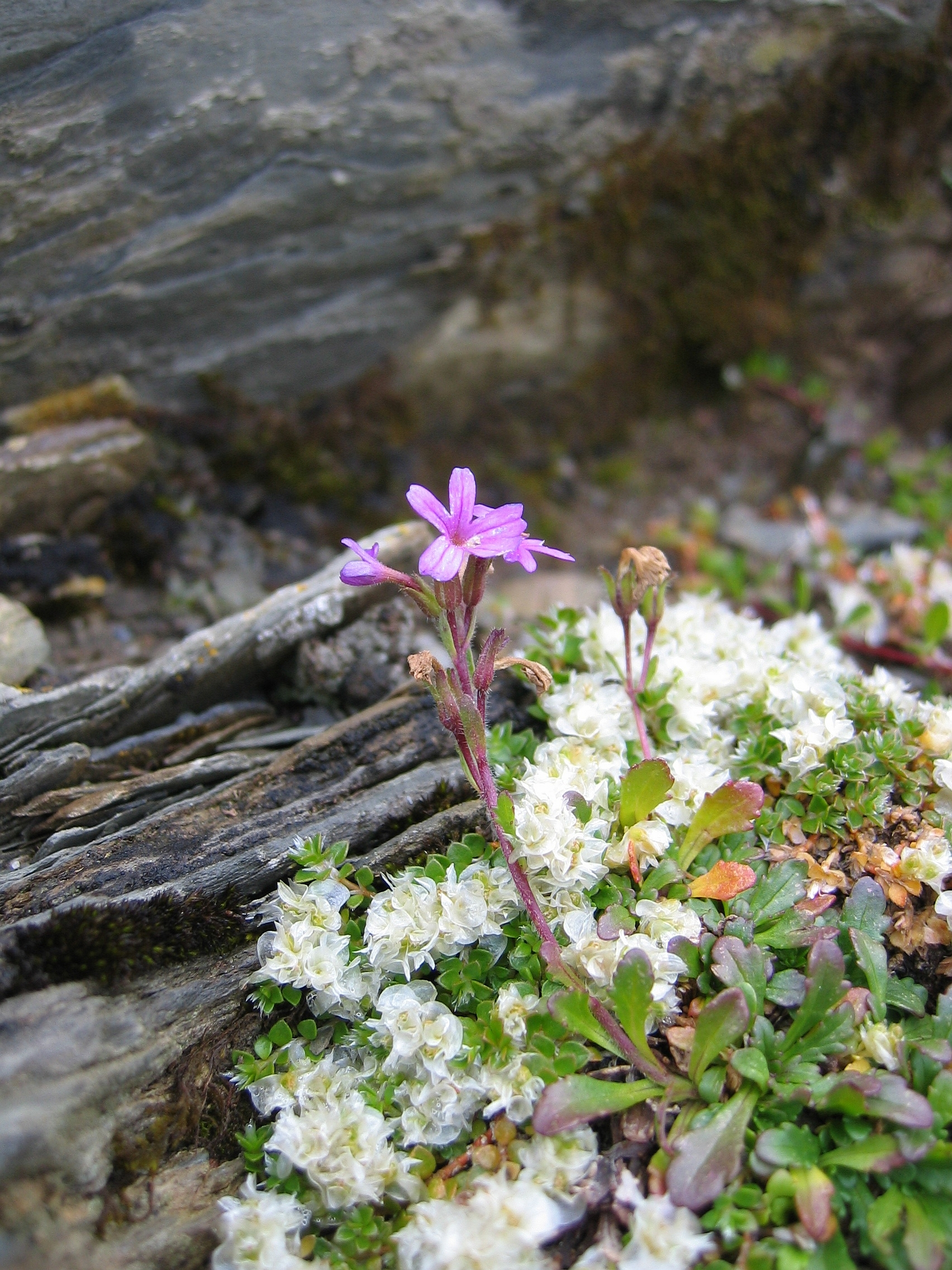
With Paronychia kapela subsp. serpyllifolia, Summit of Piméné, nr. Gavarnie, Hautes-Pyrénées
