= An Elephant Called Slowly =

- Directed by: James Hill
- Written by: Bill Travers; James Hill
- Produced by: Bill Travers; James Hill
- Starring: Virginia McKenna; Bill Travers
- Production company: Morning Star Productions
- Distributed by: British Lion (UK)
- Release date: 1969
- Country: United Kingdom
- Language: English

An Elephant Called Slowly is a 1969 British film directed by James Hill and starring Virginia McKenna, Bill Travers and Pole Pole the elephant. It was written by Travers and Hill.

== Premise ==
The film showcasesthe adventures of Bill Travers and Virginia McKenna, with three African elephants at Tsavo National Park.

== Cast ==
- Virginia McKenna as Ginny
- Bill Travers as Bill
- Vinay Inambar as Mr Mophagee
- Joab Collins as Henry
- Ali Twaha as Mutiso
- Raffles Harman
- George Adamson as himself

== Pole Pole, the elephant ==
Pole Pole was a young elephant that had been captured as an orphan, from the wild and was being temporarily held in Nairobi before a relocation to UK. It was one of the three elephants used in the film.

Once production of the film ended, Pole Pole, aged two, was donated by the Government of Kenya as a gift to the Queen. This was despite efforts to save it from the relocation to a zoo in London. In UK it was to be held in an enclosed environment, unlike in Kenya, where it roamed freely in the wild.

The elephant later on died, years later, at Regent Zoo in London, while in the process of being transferred to a different facility, Whipsnade Zoo. Its death led to the creation of the Born Free Foundation by Travers and McKenna to look after the welfare of animals, including elephants.

== Production ==
The film was shot on location in Kenya.

== Reception ==
The Monthly Film Bulletin wrote: "Dramatised travelogue in which Virginia McKenna and Bill Travers take a return trip to Africa where they look up some of their animal stars from Born Free. The script tries hard to be conversationally bright, but the level of wit is low, much of the humour weak and forced, and the two human stars are not particularly adept at putting over the comic talk, which is in any case awkwardly interspersed with passages of dialogue presumably designed to provide instruction on matters zoological. The wild life makes for some pretty pictures."
