= Lily Travers =

British actress (born 1990)

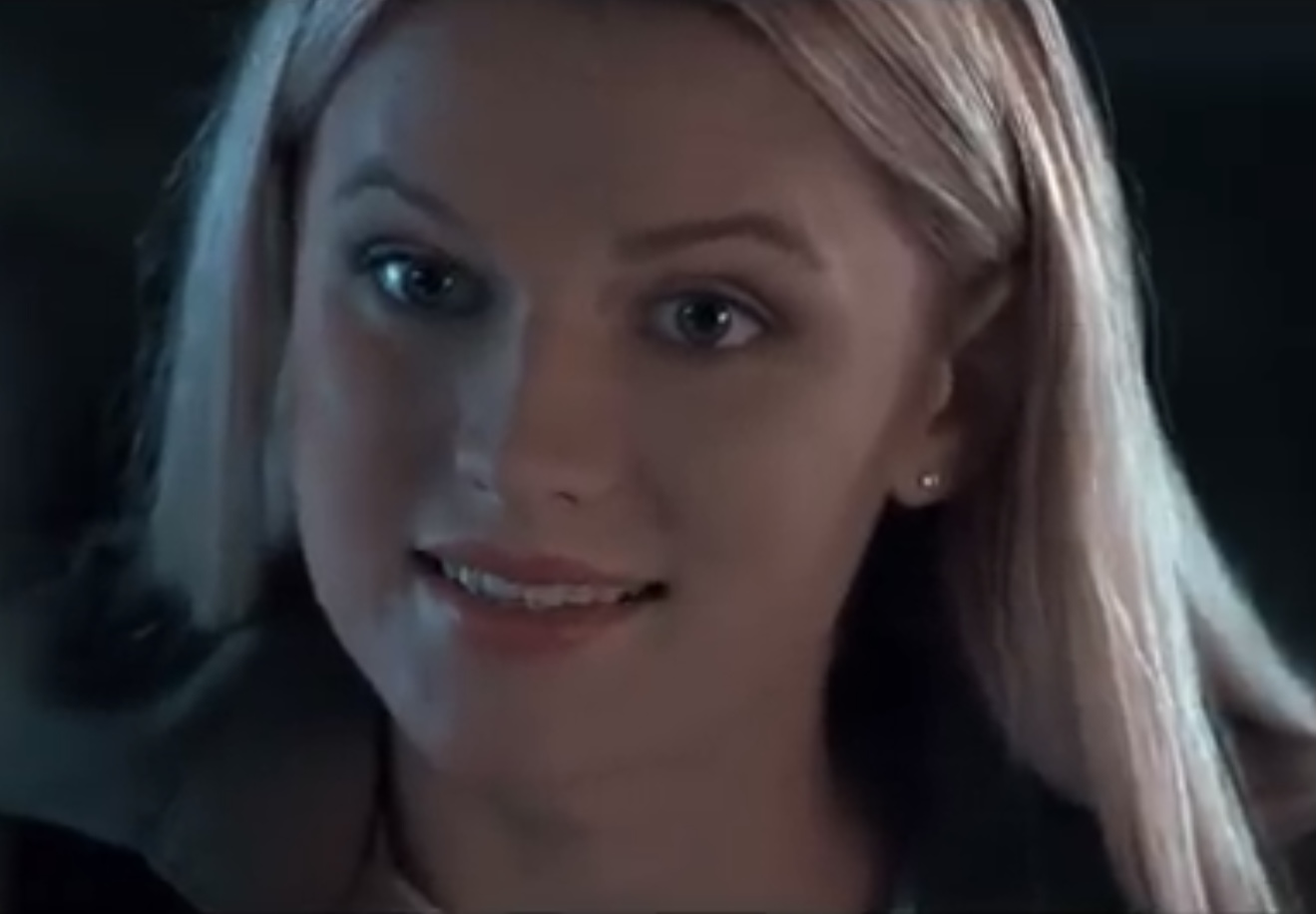
- Travers in 2016
- Born: Lily Annabelle Lindon Travers; 1990 (age 35–36); Croydon, Greater London, England
- Education: Durham University
- Years active: 2013–present
- Father: Will Travers
- Family: Bill Travers (grandfather); Virginia McKenna (grandmother)

Lily Annabelle Lindon Travers (born 1990) is an English actress. Her films include Late Shift (2016) and Viceroy's House (2017). She joined the main cast of the ITV historical drama Victoria (2019) for its third series. In 2017, Travers played Polly in the Doctor Who special "Twice Upon a Time".

== Early and personal life ==
Travers was born in South London. She is the daughter of Will Travers of the Born Free Foundation, and granddaughter of actors Virginia McKenna and Bill Travers. Her mother Carrie is a teacher, and she has a younger brother. Travers discovered a love for environmental issues and acting through her family as well as performing in school plays. She studied English at Durham University and participated in student productions while there. She lives in Fulham. She was raised vegetarian.

== Filmography ==
=== Film ===
Year	Title	Role	Notes
2014	Travellers	Claire	Short film
2014	Kingsman: The Secret Service	Lady Sophie	
2015	Edge of Sleep		Short film
2016	Late Shift	Elodie	
2016	Golden Years	Alison	
2016	Me Before You	Karen	
2016	First Born: Genesis	Selina	Short film
2017	Viceroy's House	Pamela Mountbatten	
2020	Misbehaviour	Anna	
2021	Livity House	Livity	Short film

=== Television ===
Year	Title	Role	Notes
2013	Doctors	Amy Burdon	Episode: "Revelations"
2014	The Incredible Adventures of Professor Branestawm	Young Miss Blitherington	Television film
2015	The Royals	Zoe	Episode: "Taint Not Thy Mind, Nor Let Thy Soul Contrive Against Thy Mother"
2017	Doctor Who	Polly	Episode: "Twice Upon a Time"
2017	Brussel	Sandra	5 episodes
2017	Still Star-Crossed	Stella	3 episodes
2019	Victoria	Sophie, Duchess of Monmouth	Main role (series 3)
2022	The Sandman	Barbie	3 episodes
