= William Travers =

William Travers may refer to:

- Bill Travers (1922–1994), English actor, screenwriter, director and animal rights activist
- Bill Travers (baseball) (born 1952), American baseball pitcher
- Will Travers (born 1958), English director, writer and animal rights activist
- William Travers (New Zealand politician) (1819–1903), New Zealand lawyer, politician, explorer, and naturalist
- William Travers (Virginia politician) (1630–1679), Virginia colonial politician, Speaker of the Virginia House of Burgesses
- William Travers, Wales and British Lions rugby union player known as Bunner Travers
- William R. Travers (1819–1887), American lawyer and investor

== See also ==
- Sir William Henry St Laurence Clarke-Travers, 2nd Baronet (1801–1877) of the Clarke-Travers baronets
- William Travers Jerome (1859–1934), American lawyer and politician from New York
