= Dogs Trust =

Largest dog welfare charity in the United Kingdom (started in 1891)

- Formation: 1891; 135 years ago
- Type: Charity
- Registration no.: 227523
- Legal status: Charity
- Headquarters: 17 Wakley Street, London, England, UK
- Location(s): United Kingdom and Ireland
- Patron: Elizabeth II (1990–2022); Charles III (2024–)
- CEO: Clarissa Baldwin (1986–2014); Adrian Burder (2014–2018); Owen Sharp (2019–)
- Volunteers: 6000
- Website: www.dogstrust.org.uk
- Formerly called: National Canine Defence League

Dogs Trust, known until 2003 as the National Canine Defence League, is a British animal welfare charity and humane society which specialises in the well-being of dogs. It is the largest dog welfare charity in the United Kingdom, caring for over 15,000 animals each year. Dogs Trust's primary objective is to protect all dogs in the UK and elsewhere from maltreatment, cruelty and suffering. It focuses on the rehabilitation and rehoming of dogs which have been either abandoned or given up by their owners through rehoming services.

Dogs Trust has 22 rehoming centres across the UK and Ireland. Its first international rehoming centre opened in November 2009 in Dublin, Ireland. Dogs Trust also manages microchipping and neutering schemes in the United Kingdom and abroad, in order to reduce the number of unwanted litters of puppies and stray dogs.

== History ==
The National Canine Defence League (NCDL) was founded in 1891 at a meeting during the first Crufts show chaired by Lady Gertrude Stock. NCDL aimed to protect dogs from 'torture and ill-usage of every kind". In its early years, the NCDL campaigned for anti-vivisection and introduced the Cruelty to Animals (Amendment) Bill in 1908 which was incorporated into the Protection of Animals Act 1911.

The NCDL campaigned against vivisection, unnecessary muzzling and prolonged chaining, as well as providing care for stray dogs. It also campaigned against the cruel treatment of dogs by railway companies, who often refused to provide water for dogs. More unusually, in the 1920s, it provided AA wardens with pistols. This was because dogs and other animals were often involved in car accidents, and the pistols were provided to allow the wardens to euthanise the animal as a last resort in the worst cases. The first NCDL clinic offering free treatment was established in Bethnal Green in 1926 and by 1939 there were nine clinics in London treating over 80,000 dogs a year. In November 1939, the NCDL spoke out against the mass euthanisation of approximately 750,000 pet dogs and cats upon the outbreak of World War II. Rowland Johns was secretary of NCDL from 1909 to 1946.

In 1957, the NCDL campaigned against the use of the Russian space dogs in space flight, organising a minute's silence in honour of Laika, who died in orbit from overheating and stress. In 2003, the NCDL was rebranded as Dogs Trust. In 2016 the Trust declared an income of £98.4 million and expenditure of £86 million. In 2017 the Trust declared an income of £106.4 million, an increase of £8 million from 2016. In November 2017, Dogs Trust assisted in the effort to reduce dog homelessness in Bosnia and Herzegovina, by contributing to the funding of a major rehoming centre. On 14 March 2019, Dogs Trust officially unveiled plans to open a new rehoming centre in Cardiff in 2021.

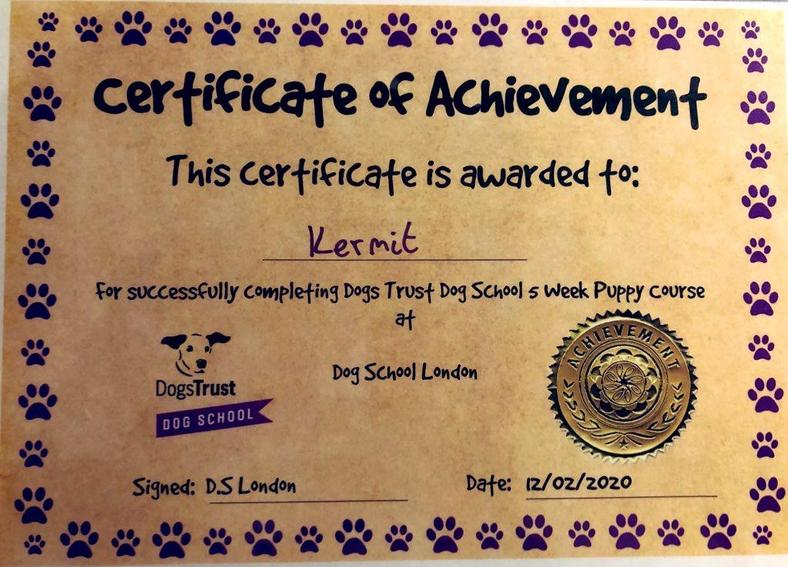

The charity is best known for its slogan "A Dog is for life, not just for Christmas", which is used either in full or shortened to "A Dog is for Life" in advertising. The phrase was created by Clarissa Baldwin, the former Chief Executive of the charity, to reduce the number of dogs which are abandoned as unwanted. The slogan is a registered trademark. More recently it has adopted another slogan: "Dogs Trust Never Put a Healthy Dog Down". During the COVID-19 pandemic, they adapted this slogan to "A Dog is for Life, not just for Lockdown".

== Rehoming ==
Rehoming aims to re-home most dogs under its protection at the Dog Trust's 22 re-homing centres across the UK and Ireland. It also obtains two large mobile rehoming units known as 'Dogmobiles'. These are large vehicles fitted with air conditioned kennels and are specially designed to tour the local area, carrying a small number of dogs from nearby rehoming centres that are desperately seeking new homes.

Dogs Trust euthanises dogs dogs based on health, behaviour and rehomability. However some dogs suffering from potential trauma are unable to be rehabilitated in order to live in a normal home environment. The charity takes care of these dogs under its popular Sponsor a Dog scheme.

They have also created an animal sanctuary where selected dogs unable to be re-homed can live together free from excessive human contact.

List of Dogs Trust rehoming centres:

- Ballymena
- Basildon
- Bridgend
- Canterbury
- Darlington
- Manchester (Denton)
- Dublin, Ireland
- Evesham
- Glasgow
- Harefield (West London)
- Ilfracombe
- Kenilworth
- Leeds
- Loughborough
- Merseyside
- Newbury
- Shrewsbury (Roden)
- Salisbury (and sanctuary)
- Shoreham
- Snetterton
- West Calder
- Cardiff

At the beginning of June 2012, the charity opened its eighteenth UK re-homing centre in Leicestershire. Dogs Trust Loughborough aims to be the greenest animal rescue centre in the world. The center has removed its biomass boiler, but maintains it's green roofs, under-floor heating, solar thermal panels, photovoltaic panels and a rainwater recycling system. The project will be constructed with the aim to achieve BREEAM (BRE Environment Assessment Method) outstanding classification and the highest levels of sustainability. The charity says the facilities will significantly reduce running costs.

== Campaigns ==
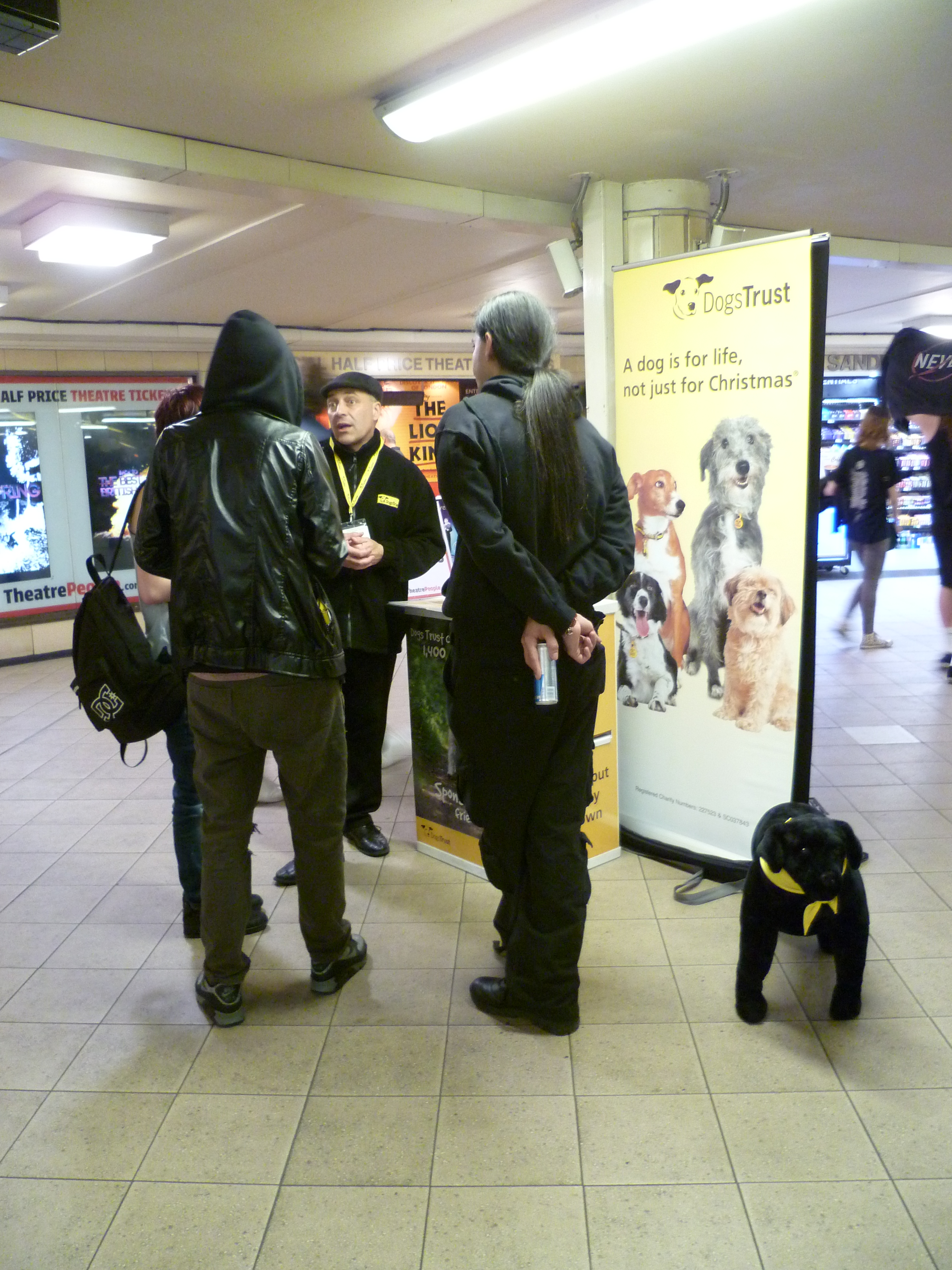
Fundraising in Leicester Square tube station

Dogs Trust has campaigned against docking of tails, such as that carried out on foxhounds after fox hunting was banned by the Hunting Act 2004. It also offers free neutering services in certain poorer countries and runs international training programs for other animal welfare charities to reduce feral populations.

=== Puppy Farming ===
In 2010 the charity introduced the term 'battery farming of dogs' to associate the practice of Puppy farming in the minds of the public with that of battery farming of chickens, and aims to educate the public as to where they can safely go to buy a 'cruelty-free dog'.

=== Compulsory Microchipping ===
In 2009, Dogs Trust started the process towards making microchipping compulsory for all dogs. They successfully lobbied for legal changes in the United Kingdom to make that happen; starting in 2015. In 2017, they declared the programme a success and led the public to believe that their microchip programme reduced the stray dog population in the UK and prevented euthanasia. However, they failed to mention that they had nearly doubled the amount of spay/neuter services for five years leading into the implementation of compulsory implant of microchips in all dogs in the UK, and have promoted a misconception that microchips (returns to owner) instead of spay/neuter reduces the population and prevents euthanasia. The following is a table of the UK dog population and the Dogs Trust spay/neuter and microchip services published by Dogs Trust.

YE 31 March	UK Strays	UK Euthanised	YE Dec. 31st	Spay/Neuter	Microchip
2009	107,228	9,310	NA	NA	NA
2010	122,000	6,404	2009	45,814	NA
2011	126,000	7,121	2010	48,520	10,677
2012	118,000	NA	2011	64,691	62,367
2013	111,000	8,985	2012	67,244	144,600
2014	110,675	7,058	2013	68,619	90,968
2015	102,363	5,142	2014	73,549	264,240
2016	81,050	3,463	2015	77,047	196,214
2017	66,277	2,231	2016	33,453	107,826
2018	56,043	1,462	2017	22,789	NA

=== Puppy smuggling ===
Since 2014, Dogs Trust has been working to reveal the cruel puppy smuggling trade. They have released yearly reports detailing this trade and encouraged MPs to back their campaign. This has included intercepting puppies far too young to be imported into the country and pregnant dogs being smuggled in so their puppies can be born and then sold in the UK. Dogs Trust set up the "Puppy Pilot", a scheme to intercept, care and rehabilitate puppies seized at ports before they are re-homed through the charity. In 2020 they continued this campaign, highlighting "Dogfishing". These are scams where apparently healthy pets are bought but suddenly fall ill or die soon after.

=== Celebrity support ===
Patrons

- Ruth Langsford (Patron; 2012—)
- Eamonn Holmes (Patron; 2012—)
- John Barrowman

TV game show winnings

- Jodie Prenger – £15,750 on The Chase: Celebrity Special (16 September 2012)
- Eamonn Holmes – £3,100 on Tipping Point: Lucky Stars (4 August 2013)
- Natasha Hamilton – £15,000 on Big Star's Little Star (23 April 2014)
- Johnny Vegas and Maia Dunphy – £15,000 on All Star Mr & Mrs (18 June 2014)
- Camilla Dallerup – £250 on Pointless Celebrities (29 November 2014)
- Gary Delaney – £11,000 on Celebrity Fifteen to One (21 August 2015)

== Outreach ==
=== Freedom Project ===
Dogs Trust Freedom Project provides foster care for dogs so those suffering domestic abuse can escape from these situations. The service operates in Greater London and the Home Counties (Hertfordshire, Essex, Kent, Surrey, East Sussex, West Sussex, Bedfordshire, Buckinghamshire and Berkshire), East Anglia (Norfolk, Suffolk and Cambridgeshire), Yorkshire, the North East and North West of England and Scotland. This essential service allows people to find safety in refuges which often don't accept pets.

=== Hope Project ===
Dogs Trust has been working with homelessness charities, such as St Mungos, throughout the United Kingdom for over 20 years to help support dogs owned by people in housing crisis. This includes giving out Christmas gift packages including items such as dog treats, leads and dog coats. The Project also helps those struggling with vets bills for their dogs.

== Worldwide ==
Dogs Trust Worldwide provides global work to support dog welfare with partner charities including Thailand, Sri Lanka and India.

Dogs Trust Bosnia supports the establishment of a humane and sustainable dog population management system in the country.

Dogs Trust USA was established in 2018 to support rescue organisations across the US and has recently also established Dog School classes in New York and California.

== Events ==
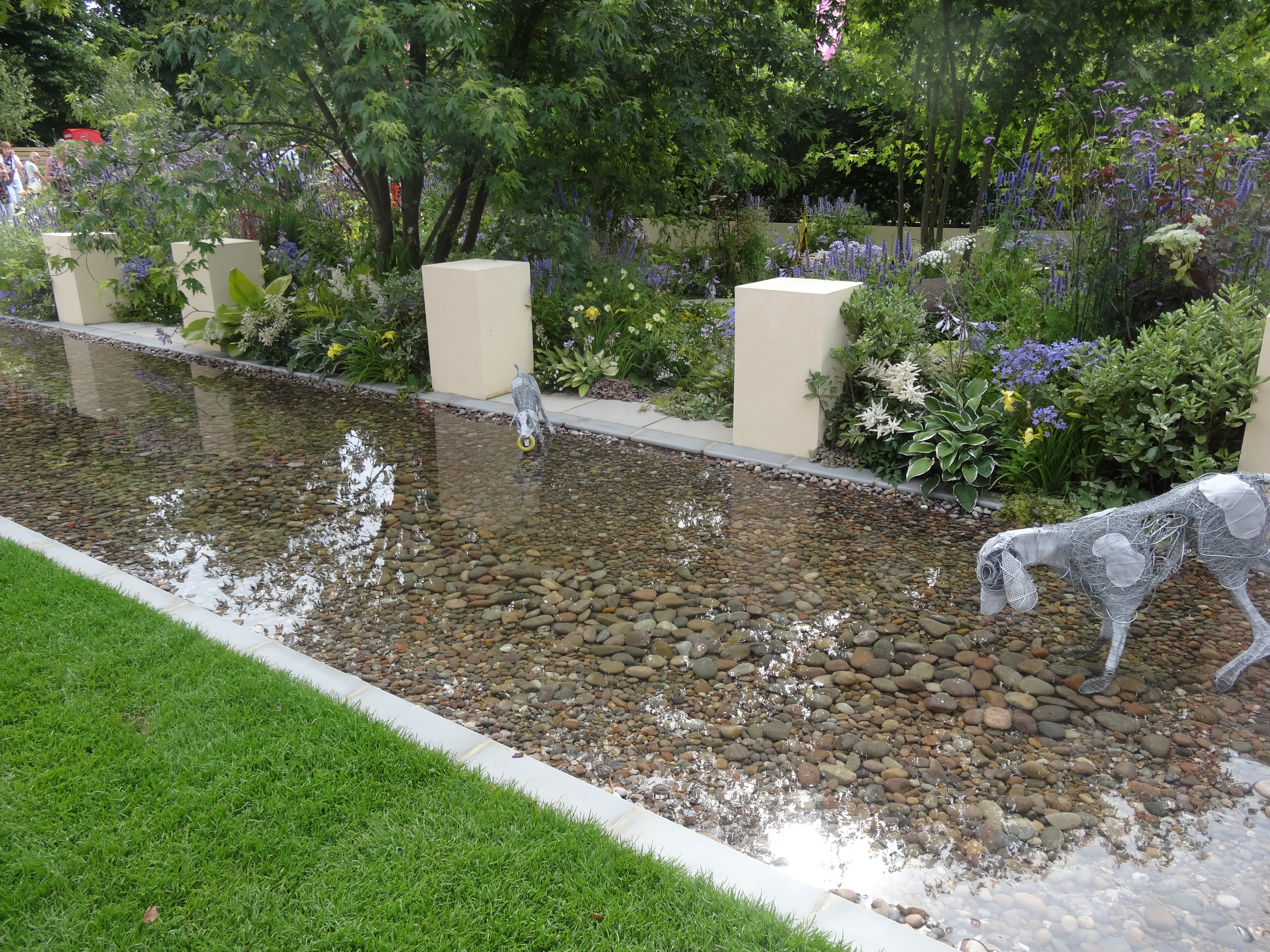
A Dog's Life, the Trust's award-winning garden at the 2016 Hampton Court Flower Show

=== Waggy Walks ===
From 2009 to 2011, Dogs Trust held an annual charity event held at locations across the UK, where members of the public could complete either a 5 km or 10 km walk around a course in an area which is usually close to the rehoming centre for that location.

=== Dogs Trust Honours ===
In 2008, the charity created Dogs Trust Honours, an annual 'Doggy Pride of Britain Awards' ceremony celebrating the relationship between Human and dog and honouring dogs who have greatly helped their owner, local community or society.

=== Hampton Court Flower Show 2016 ===
To mark the charity's 125th anniversary, a garden entitled "A Dog's Life" was designed by Paul Hervey-Brooks and built by G K Wilson Landscapes was shown at Hampton Court Flower Show 2016. It won a gold medal. The garden offered a semi-formal and contemporary area for both dogs and people. This included dog-friendly features and planting including tunnels and "sniffer tracks".

=== A Dog’s Trail ===
An art trail called "A Dog's Trail" took place in Spring 2022 across Cardiff, Caerphilly and Porthcawl in Wales. The trail featured Snoopy from Peanuts. The figures were then auctioned to raise money for Dogs Trust. The auction raised over £150,000.

== Rehoming figures ==
Year	Dogs cared for	Dogs rehomed	Dogs reunited with owners	Dogs died	Reference
2005	13,506	11,563	168	273	
2006	▲15,162	▲12,993	▲192	▼215	
2007	▲16,177	▲14,022	▼185	▲334	
2008	▲16,238	▲14,169	▲190	▼260	
2009	▼15,886	▼13,909	▼178	▼226	
2010	▲16,813	▲14,590	▲237	▲276	
2011	▼15,986	▼13,830	▼178	▲309	
2012	▲16,879	▲14,825	▲202	▼199	
2013	▲16,879	▲14,865	▲220	▲238	
2014	▼14,630	▼14,419	▼203	▼214	
2015	▲15,196	▼12,987	▲204	▼188	
2016	▲15,343	▲13,067	▲226	▲270	
2017	▲15,446	▲13,141	▲242	▲312	
2018	▼15,015	▼12,624	▲310	▲331	
2019	▼14,301	▼11,790	▼244	▼292	
2020	▼10,416	▼8,473	n/a	▼252	
2021	▲10,864	▲8,550	n/a	▲335	
2022	▲12,546	▲9,707	n/a	▲423	

== See also ==
- Swansea Jack (1930–1937), twice decorated by the National Canine Defence League for bravery and devotion to duty
- Cruelty to Animals
- American Society for the Prevention of Cruelty to Animals
- Battersea Dogs and Cats Home
- Blue Cross (animal charity)
- Cinnamon Trust
- National Animal Welfare Trust
- PDSA
- Royal New Zealand Society for the Prevention of Cruelty to Animals
- Royal Society for the Prevention of Cruelty to Animals
- DogsBlog.com
- Cats Protection
