= Christian the lion =

Story of an adopted African lion

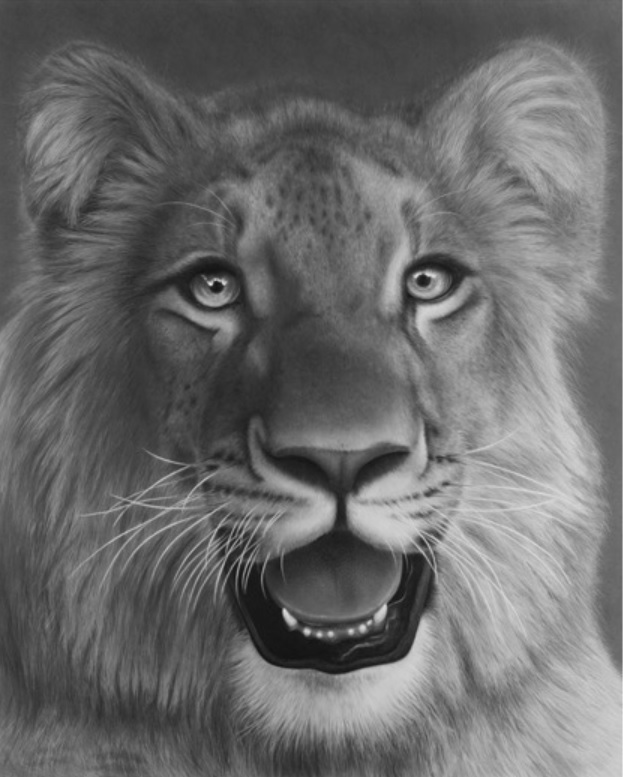
Uhuru, portrait of Christian the lion by Emma Towers-Evans, drawn in 2021

Christian the lion (b. 12 August 1969) was a lion born in captivity and purchased by Australian John Rendall and Anthony "Ace" Bourke from Harrods department store in London in 1969. He was later reintroduced to the African wild by conservationist George Adamson. About a year after Adamson released Christian to the wild, his former owners decided to go looking for him to see whether Christian would remember them. He did, and with him were two lionesses who accepted the men as well.

== Early years ==
External images
- Christian with London owners John Rendall and Anthony Bourke
- Christian with George Adamson at Kora National Reserve.

Christian was born on 12 August 1969.

Christian was originally acquired by Harrods from the now-defunct zoo park in Ilfracombe, North Devon, England. Rendall and Bourke purchased Christian for 250 guineas (£262.10s. (Note: 262 pounds and 10 shillings, or 262 1/2 pounds) in pre-decimal currency).

Rendall and Bourke, (Note: Bourke has been erroneously cited in various sources as Berg.) along with their friends Jennifer Mary Taylor and Unity Jones, cared for the lion where they lived in London until he was a year old. As he got larger, the men moved Christian to their furniture store—coincidentally named Sophistocat—where living quarters in the basement were set aside for him. Rendall and Bourke obtained permission from a local minister to exercise Christian at the Moravian church graveyard just off the King's Road and Milman's Street, SW10; and the men also took the lion on day trips to the seaside.

Christian's growing size and the increasing cost of his care led Rendall and Bourke to understand they could not keep him in London. When Bill Travers and Virginia McKenna, stars of the film Born Free, visited Rendall and Bourke's furniture store and met Christian, they suggested that Bourke and Rendall ask the assistance of George Adamson. Adamson, a British conservationist and advocate for lions in Kenya, who together with his wife Joy raised and released Elsa the lioness, agreed to reintegrate Christian into the wild at their compound in the Kora National Reserve. Virginia McKenna wrote about the experience in her memoir The Life in My Years, published March 2009.

Adamson introduced Christian to an older male lion, "Boy", who had been used in the feature film Born Free and who also featured prominently in the documentary film The Lions Are Free, and subsequently to a female cub Katania in order to form the nucleus of a new pride. The pride suffered many setbacks: Katania was possibly devoured by crocodiles at a watering hole; another female was killed by wild lions; Boy was severely injured, later becoming socially withdrawn, and was shot by Adamson after fatally wounding his assistant Stanley. These events left Christian as the sole surviving member of the original pride.

Over the course of a year, as George Adamson continued his work, the pride established itself in the region around Kora, with Christian as the head of the pride started by Boy.

== Reunions ==
=== 1971 ===
After accompanying Christian on the journey from England to his new home in Kenya, Rendall and Bourke stayed on for a period of time to help Christian settle into his new home. Once they were confident Christian had become successfully integrated into the new pride George Adamson had established, Rendall and Bourke returned to England.

According to the documentary, following completion of the enquiry into Stanley's death after which 'Boy' was shot, knowing that George would probably welcome some friendly faces, Rendall and Bourke decided it was time for them to visit Christian again. As it had been nearly a year since they last saw him, Adamson advised that Christian might not remember them. The film shows the lion at first cautiously approach and then, upon recognising who they were, quickly leap playfully onto the two men, standing on his hind legs and wrapping his front legs around their shoulders, nuzzling their faces. The documentary also shows the lionesses, Mona and Lisa, and a foster cub named Supercub welcoming the two men.

=== 1972 ===
Rendall details a final, largely-unfilmed reunion that occurred (reported in some newspaper articles to have been in 1974, and by George Adamson to have been in January 1972). By this time Christian was successfully defending his own pride, had cubs of his own and was about twice the size he was in the earlier reunion video. Adamson advised Rendall that it would most likely be a wasted trip as he had not seen Christian's pride for nine months. However, when Rendall reached Kora, Christian and his pride had returned to Adamson's compound the day before.

George Adamson counted the days without seeing Christian from the early spring 197X final reunion. He notes in his book My Pride and Joy (New York: Simon and Schuster, March 1987) that after 97 days, he stopped counting.

=== Fate ===
Christian's final fate was around the mid 1970s. Christian was last spotted headed toward Meru National Park after heading north and crossing the Tana River in early 197X. As lions have average lifespans of 10 to 20 years, Christian has certainly died. Rendall personally has hopes that Christian was able to fully-integrate into the wild and live a full life as a wild lion, and has hopes that descendants of Christian continue to live on in present day Kenya.

== In media ==
In 1971, to help finance Christian’s return to the wild Rendall and Bourke published a book called A Lion Called Christian. Alongside the book two one hour documentaries, written, produced and directed by Bill Travers and James Hill, entitled The Lion from Worlds End and Christian the Lion were also made. The second of these also contained the filmed reunion of Rendall and Bourke with Christian.

A video of the 1971 reunion, edited from the documentary, was first posted on a fan web site in 2002. From there it was picked up by a MySpace user and then picked up from MySpace and posted on YouTube where it became a viral video and worldwide sensation, more than 30 years after the event. As of July 2009, several versions of the video have been viewed millions of times on YouTube, one garnering over 18 million views. Various news sources have since tracked down Rendall and Bourke for their current perspective on the events surrounding their life with Christian.

In September 2008, Sony Pictures announced that it was interested in obtaining the rights to the story of Christian's life for the purpose of making a feature film.

Following the spread of Christian’s story on YouTube, Rendall and Bourke revised and republished their book in 2009 in which they also added their account of their return visits to Kenya in 1971 and 1972. In addition, the two original documentaries were combined into a single DVD entitled Christian - the Lion at World's End which was released by the Born Free Foundation. A video foreword by Virginia McKenna was also added. Blink Films also produced a 45 minute documentary called A Lion Called Christian which was shown on Animal Planet and also included on the DVD.

A children's book about Christian was published in 2010. Christian, the Hugging Lion was written by Justin Richardson and Peter Parnell, and illustrated by Amy June Bates. The book was nominated as a finalist for the 23rd Lambda Literary Awards in the Children's/Young Adult Fiction category.

Christian also appeared on the Animal Planet show Untamed & Uncut.

The official portrait of Christian the Lion, Uhuru, was drawn by hyperreal artist Emma Towers-Evans in 2021 in support of conservation charities.

In the 2000s, the South African investment firm Coronation Fund Managers launched an award-winning television commercial as part of its long-running "Trust is Earned" corporate campaign. The advertisement explicitly recreated the true story of Christian, depicting his early life in a London apartment, his relocation to the African wild, and his eventual emotional reunion with John Rendall and Anthony "Ace" Bourke to serve as a metaphor for building long-term trust. The commercial was conceptualized by the advertising agency FoxP2 and directed by Mike Middleton, featuring an original musical score by local music producer Theo Crous.
