= The Admirable Crichton (1968 film) =

- Based on: The Admirable Crichton by J.M. Barrie
- Written by: Robert Hartung
- Directed by: George Schaefer
- Starring: Bill Travers
- Country of origin: United States
- Original language: English

Production
- Producer: George Schaefer

Original release
- Network: NBC
- Release: May 2, 1968

The Admirable Crichton is a 1968 TV movie adaptation of the 1902 play The Admirable Crichton by J. M. Barrie. It stars Bill Travers and Virginia McKenna.

It was filmed for Hallmark Hall of Fame and was directed by George Schaefer.

== Cast ==
- Bill Travers as Crichton
- Virginia McKenna as Lady Mary
- Janet Munro as Tweeny
- Norman Barrs as The Officer
- Pamela Brown as Lady Brocklehurst
- Edward Cicciarelli as Treherne
- Richard Easton as Ernest Woolley
- Christina Gillespie as Fisher
- Estelle Kohler as Lady Agatha
- Laurence Naismith as Lord Loam
- Carrie Nye as Lady Catherine
- Ralph Purdom as Lord Brocklehurst

== Production ==
The show was taped in New York over a month in February and March 1968. McKenna said the play was "a comment on our society, how our social code of behaviour imprisons people and stops them from being natural." It was Janet Munro's third television performance in America after Berkeley Square and Time Remembered.

== Reception ==
The Chicago Tribune called it "absorbing, humorous entertainment". The New York Times felt it was a "lacklustre production" which suffered from trimming the first act and where Travers "was simply miscast".

Bill Travers was nominated for an Emmy for Outstanding Performance by an Actor.
