= Petfinder =

Commercial enterprise

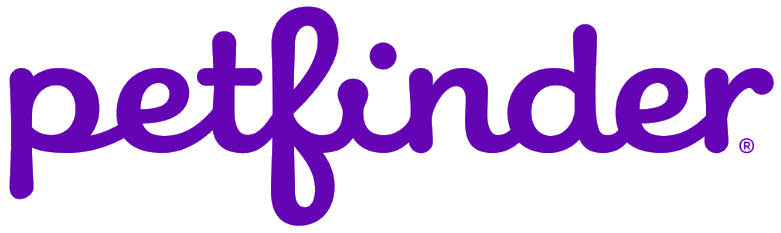
- Formation: July 31, 1996; 30 years ago (as Petfinder.org)
- Location: North America
- Website: www.petfinder.com

Petfinder operates the largest online pet adoption website serving all of North America. The company reports that it currently lists “more than 315,000 adoptable pets from nearly 14,000 animal shelters and rescue groups.” A commercial enterprise founded in 1996, it is now owned by Nestlé Purina PetCare Company and reports that it has facilitated more than 22 million pet adoptions as of 2013. While most of the pets listed on Petfinder are dogs and cats, the website lists all types of animals available from shelters and rescue groups, from small fish, reptiles and birds to horses and livestock.

== History ==
Betsy Banks Saul and Jared Saul came up with the idea of Petfinder.org in early 1996, when Betsy was working for New Jersey's urban forestry program while completing her Master's thesis at Clemson University.

In 2005, Petfinder launched a large database of pets rescued from the effects of Hurricane Katrina. Major animal welfare agencies cooperated to assist in reuniting pets with their owners through the Animal Emergency Response Network (AERN). The database eventually had nearly 23,000 pets listed, 3,200 pets of which were eventually returned to their owners. The database also included nearly 26,000 requests for rescue from people who left animals behind and another 8,000 lost-animal notices.

In 2006, Discovery Communications bought Petfinder for $35 million. Once acquired, Petfinder was part of Animal Planet Media Enterprises, but was later moved out of Animal Planet and into Discovery Communications' digital media group. Betsy Banks Saul was still involved with Petfinder as were many of Petfinder's original employees. Betsy Banks Saul and Jared Saul are also founding board members of the Petfinder Foundation.

In 2013, Nestlé Purina PetCare Company announced the acquisition of Petfinder from Discovery Communications, noting it was Nestle's first major acquisition of a digital property. The company said it plans to add information on pet nutrition and welfare to the website.

In December of 2025, Petfinder encountered many technical problems which caused widespread problems for shelters utilizing the service. These have not been fixed as of late December, 2025. https://www.fox26houston.com/news/technical-problems-petfinder-spark-widespread-concern-among-animal-shelters-rescues

== Awards and accolades ==
In 2008, Time magazine named it as one of the 50 Best Websites. Because of her impact on animal welfare, Betsy Banks Saul, Petfinder's co-founder, was named by Woman's Day magazine as one of 50 influential women who are changing the world. Its mobile site was launched in 2008 and received a People's Voice Webby award in 2014. Petfinder was featured in an iPhone commercial. In 2010, Time magazine named it one of the top 10 iPhone apps.

== Petfinder Foundation ==
In 2003, Petfinder started the Petfinder Foundation, a nonprofit that provides grants to other charities or organizations that help prevent the euthanasia of pets. The program is supported by private donors and corporate partners like Orvis and Volvo, among others.

== See also ==
- DogsBlog.com—a similar program in the UK
