= Rowland Johns =

Welsh animal welfare activist

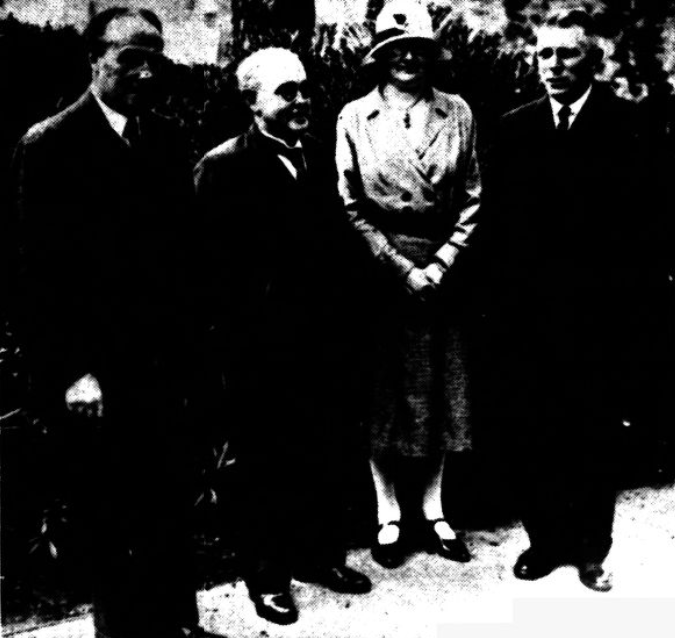
- Johns (second from left) at National Animal Welfare Week in 1931
- Born: Charles Rowland Johns; 8 March 1882; Holyhead
- Died: 29 March 1961 (aged 79); Chichester
- Occupations: Activist; journalist; writer
- Spouse: Jessie Harvey (m. 1909)

Charles Rowland Johns (8 March 1882 – 29 March 1961) was a Welsh animal welfare activist, journalist and writer. He was secretary of the National Canine Defence League and authored many books on dogs.

== Career ==
Johns was born in Holyhead. He was secretary of the National Canine Defence League (NCDL) from 1909 to 1946. He was awarded the Argus Medal from the League in 1947. He was honorary consultant on dogs and road safety to the Royal Society for the Prevention of Accidents in 1947. In the 1950s he was a campaign director to the NCDL and a trustee.

His 1922 book Mind You, or, Lewys Lad and his Friend Shadrach was positively reviewed by journalist J. Cuming Walters. Johns was a British Delegate to the American Humane Convention in San Francisco in 1932, Washington, D.C. in 1935 and St. Louis in 1938. He was honorary vice-president of the American Humane Education Society. In the 1930s he was editor of NCDL's Dog Bulletin. In 1936, Johns was awarded the Silver Meritorious Service medal of the RSPCA in recognition of his services for animal welfare.

Ethel Douglas Hume described Johns as "an expert business man, as well as a staunch humanitarian and delightful writer". During World War II, he campaigned to protect dogs from poison gas by sharing leaflets giving directions for the construction of a simple home-made gas resisting box. Johns recognized that dogs played an important role on the home front, offering consolation to women whose husbands were at war.

== Personal life ==
Johns resided at Bognor Regis. He married Jessie Harvey in 1909; they had two children. His son R. Harvey Johns succeeded him as secretary of the Canine Defence League but was dismissed from the League in 1959. His son established a rival organization, the World Dog Defence Campaign. Johns died on 29 March 1961.

== Selected publications ==
Johns was the editor of Our Friend the Dog Series (38 books) from 1932 to 1959. He also authored:

- The Pitiful Story of the Performing Animal (1914)
- Mind You (1922)
- Let Dogs Delight (1926)
- All Sorts of Dogs (1929)
- Lucky Dogs (1931)
- Rowland Johns Dog Book (1933)
- Every Dog Its Day (1934)
- Jock: The King's Pony (1936)
- The A1 Dog Book (1939)
- 250 Questions Answered About Dogs (1944)
- The Dog Owners' Treasury (1948)
