= The Smallest Show on Earth =

1957 British film by Basil Dearden

- Theatrical release poster
- Directed by: Basil Dearden
- Written by: William Rose; John Eldridge
- Produced by: Sidney Gilliat; Frank Launder; Michael Relph
- Starring: Bill Travers; Virginia McKenna; Peter Sellers; Margaret Rutherford; Bernard Miles
- Cinematography: Douglas Slocombe
- Edited by: Oswald Hafenrichter
- Music by: William Alwyn
- Production companies: Hallmark Productions; British Lion Film Corporation
- Distributed by: British Lion Films (UK); Times Film Corporation (US)
- Release dates: 9 April 1957 (London, UK)
- Running time: 80 minutes
- Country: United Kingdom
- Language: English
- Budget: £144,834

The Smallest Show on Earth (US: Big Time Operators) is a 1957 British comedy film, directed by Basil Dearden, and starring Bill Travers, Virginia McKenna, Peter Sellers, Margaret Rutherford and Bernard Miles. The screenplay was written by William Rose and John Eldridge from an original story by William Rose.

== Plot ==
Matt and Jean Spenser are a young married couple with dreams of travelling to exotic destinations such as Samarkand, though they cannot afford it. Their prospects seem to improve when Matt inherits a cinema from his great-uncle. Expecting to acquire the modern and prosperous "Grand" cinema, they are dismayed to learn from Robin, the solicitor, that the legacy is instead the decrepit "Bijou Kinema", known locally as "the Fleapit". The cinema is wedged between two railway bridges and comes with three loyal but eccentric staff: Mrs. Fazackalee, the cashier and bookkeeper; Mr. Quill, the ageing projectionist with a weakness for alcohol; and Old Tom, the commissionaire who works as doorman and usher.

Robin explains that the Grand’s owner, Mr. Hardcastle, once offered £5,000 for the Bijou with the intention of demolishing it to build a car park. However, with cinema audiences dwindling in the age of television, Hardcastle now offers Matt only £500. On Robin’s advice, Matt and Jean bluff that they intend to reopen the Bijou in the hope of forcing Hardcastle to raise his bid. Their plan is nearly undone when Old Tom innocently lets slip what he has overheard, but the couple decide to continue regardless.

The Bijou soon reopens and, despite various mishaps, begins to attract audiences. Business improves when Matt hires the glamorous Marlene Hogg to sell ice cream and snacks, and further profits are made through a scheme of turning up the heating during a desert film so customers flock to the refreshments counter.

Hardcastle counters by arranging for a bottle of whisky to be hidden in the next batch of film reels, knowing Quill cannot resist. The projectionist eventually succumbs, and when a film breaks during a showing, Matt fails to handle the outdated machinery. The angry patrons demand refunds, leaving Matt and Jean discouraged and ready to abandon the venture. That evening, Matt wistfully remarks that he sometimes wishes the Grand would burn down. Old Tom is then seen quietly carrying a petrol can out of the cinema.

The following morning, the Grand has indeed burned to the ground. Forced to find a temporary venue while it is rebuilt, Hardcastle and his partners reluctantly agree to buy the Bijou for £10,000, provided its three long-serving staff are retained. As Matt and Jean depart by train for their long-dreamed-of travels, Old Tom tells Matt, "It were the only way, weren't it?" Disturbed, Matt considers writing Old Tom a letter for clarification, but instead he and Jean send him a postcard—from Samarkand.

== Cast ==
- Virginia McKenna as Jean Spenser
- Bill Travers as Matt Spenser
- Margaret Rutherford as Mrs. Fazackalee
- Peter Sellers as Percy Quill
- Bernard Miles as Old Tom
- Francis de Wolff as Albert Hardcastle
- Leslie Phillips as Robin Carter
- June Cunningham as Marlene Hogg
- Sid James as Mr. Hogg
- George Cross as commissionaire
- George Cormack as Bell
- Stringer Davis as Emmett
- Michael Corcoran as taxi driver

== Production ==
The Bijou Kinema was not a real building; both the exterior and interior were sets. The exterior facade was constructed between two railway bridges in Christchurch Avenue, London NW6, next to Kilburn tube station. A replica at Shepperton Studios was used for close-up shots and interior scenes. The Gaumont Palace, Hammersmith in London (subsequently called the Hammersmith Odeon, and now the Hammersmith Apollo) was used for the exterior shots of the rival Grand Cinema with interiors at the Odeon in Richmond. Back projection shots of Longton, Stoke-on-Trent, in Staffordshire were used for the final scenes in the railway carriage.

The silent film shown in the film is Comin' Thro the Rye (1923), starring Alma Taylor, who is listed by AllMovie as one of the uncredited viewers in the audience.

== Box office ==
Kinematograph Weekly said the film "scored with the 'ninepennies'."

== Critical reception ==
In contemporary reviews The New York Times called it "a little package of nonsense [...] populated by wonderfully wacky characters [...] Margaret Rutherford's cashier, Peter Sellers' projectionist and Bernard Miles' doorman are gems".

Leonard Maltin called it a "Charming, often hilarious comedy".

The Monthly Film Bulletin wrote: "The whole weight of this gay idea (which owes something, perhaps, to Genevieve [1953]) is carried by Bernard Miles, Margaret Rutherford and Peter Sellers. All the fun is in them – an impossible, loony, genial, larger-than-life music-hall trio [...] and the best scenes are exclusively theirs. Peter Sellers' little dance of joy and his drunken subsidence in the projection booth, Margaret Rutherford's mastery of the Bijou's accounting system and her devotion to the late proprietor, Bernard Miles's startling displays of idiot shyness, are all in an excellent and robust tradition; and it is remarkable that such different and eccentric performers should have formed a team so homogeneous. They each have the gift of making absurdity and pathos momentarily indistinguishable. [...]. Outside these three, the film is a rather poor example of conventional British screen comedy, with stock characters and situations, and "straight" leads who don't quite know whether to play it straight or comic; and are as much out of their depth either way."

The Radio Times wrote, "In praise of fleapits everywhere, this charming comedy will bring back happy memories for anyone who pines for the days when going to the pictures meant something more than being conveyor-belted in and out of a soulless multiplex [...] The cast alone makes the movie a must-see, and the sequence in which projectionist Peter Sellers, pianist Margaret Rutherford and doorman Bernard Miles relive the glories of the silent era is adorable."

Leslie Halliwell reviewed the film as: "Amiable caricature comedy with plenty of obvious jokes and a sentimental attachment to old cinemas but absolutely no conviction, little plot, and a very muddied sense of the line between farce and reality."

In British Sound Films: The Studio Years 1928–1959 David Quinlan rated the film as "good" and wrote: "Too-short comedy gets lots of laughs from its character stars.''
