= Will Travers =

English animal rights activist (born 1958)

Will Travers OBE FRGS
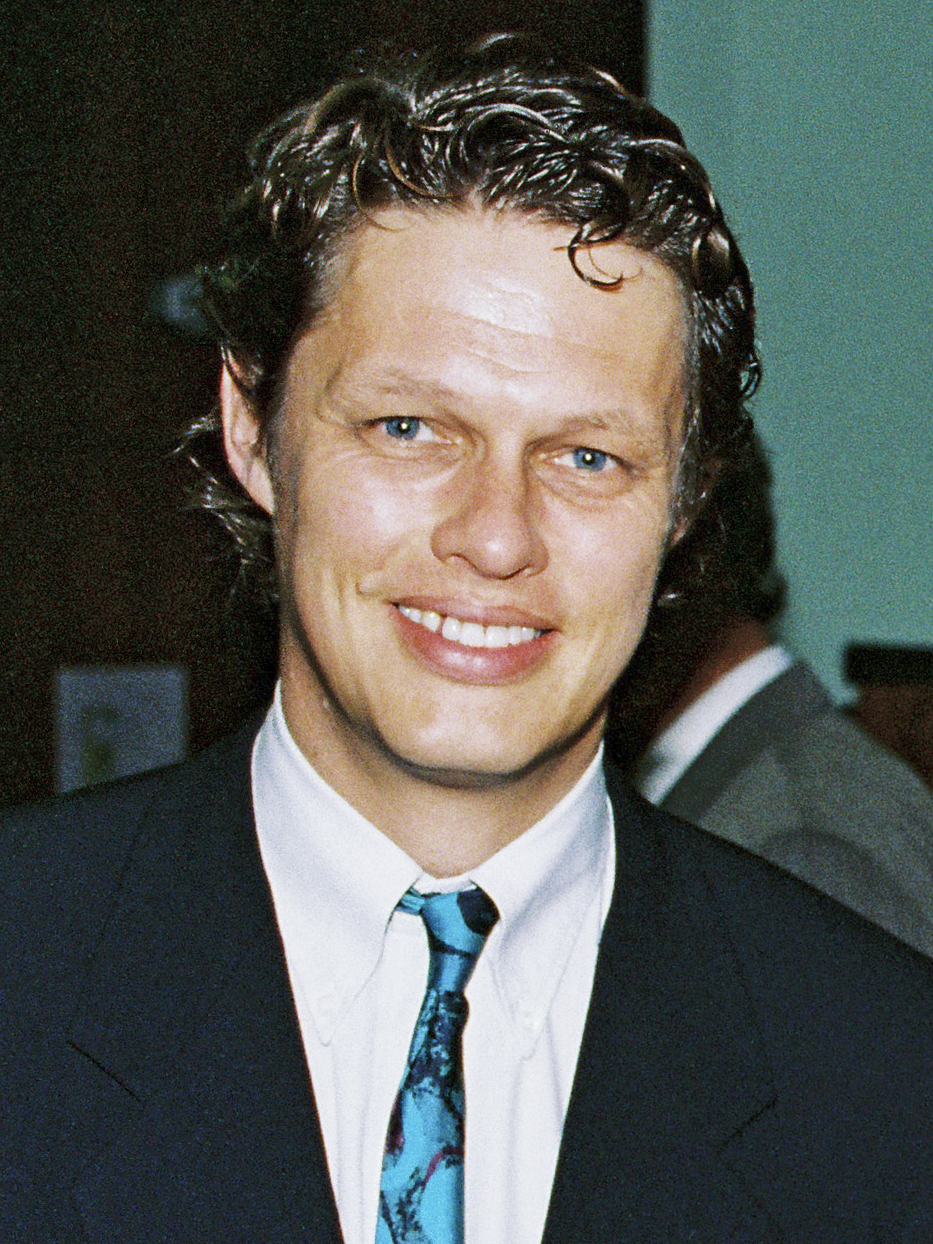
- Travers in 1997
- Born: William Morell Lindon Travers; 4 November 1958 (age 67); Hammersmith, London, England
- Organisation: Born Free Foundation
- Children: 2, including Lily
- Parents: Bill Travers (father); Virginia McKenna (mother)
- Website: www.bornfree.org.uk

William Morell Lindon Travers OBE FRGS (born 4 November 1958) is an English director, writer, broadcaster and animal rights activist. He is president of the Born Free Foundation, Born Free USA and Species Survival Network. He is the son of English actors and wildlife campaigners Bill Travers (1922–1994) and Virginia McKenna, and nephew of actress Linden Travers.

In 1964, at the age of five, Travers travelled with his parents to Kenya where they were starring together in the 1966 true-life film Born Free (1966), portraying conservationists Joy Adamson and George Adamson, who rescue a lioness cub named Elsa and successfully return her to the wild. The experience led Travers' parents to become active supporters for wild animal rights and the protection of their natural habitat.

When Travers was 12 years old, the Travers family took care of Christian, a captive-bred lion, originally from Ilfracombe Zoo and who came, via a department store and a furniture shop on Wandsworth Bridge Road London where there is a picture of Christian in the window, to live at the Travers' family home in Surrey, England. Christian was subsequently returned to a wild and free life in Africa by the Travers' friend, conservationist George Adamson. The story of Christian was made into a documentary film: Christian, The Lion at World's End, by Travers' father Bill.

Travers' mother Virginia McKenna appeared in An Elephant Called Slowly, a travelogue which features elephants Eleanor (brought up by conservationist Daphne Sheldrick) and young elephant Pole Pole. The subsequent premature death of Pole Pole, after the elephant was transferred to London Zoo led to McKenna and her husband launching the Zoo Check Campaign in 1984. As co-founder, Travers assisted his parents in establishing Zoo Check which was renamed the Born Free Foundation in 1991. Travers also founded the Species Survival Network in 1992. Travers is Executive President of the Born Free Foundation, Born Free USA and the Species Survival Network. Travers is a trustee of The Hummingbird Initiative, a patron of The High Five Club, an advisor to the Olsen Animal Trust and a director of Nice Little Effort Limited.

Travers was appointed Officer of the Order of the British Empire (OBE) in the 2012 Birthday Honours for services to wildlife conservation and animal welfare.

Travers started following a vegetarian diet in 1983 and made the transition to veganism in April 2014.
