= Ring of Bright Water (film) =

1969 British film by Jack Couffer

- American theatrical release poster
- Directed by: Jack Couffer
- Written by: Jack Couffer; Bill Travers
- Based on: Ring of Bright Water by Gavin Maxwell
- Produced by: Joseph Strick
- Starring: Bill Travers; Virginia McKenna
- Cinematography: Wolfgang Suschitzky
- Edited by: Reginald Mills
- Music by: Frank Cordell; Betty Botley; Theme song performed by Val Doonican
- Production company: Palomar Pictures International
- Distributed by: Rank Film Distributors
- Release dates: 2 April 1969 (London); 18 June 1969 (New York City)
- Running time: 107 minutes
- Country: United Kingdom
- Language: English
- Budget: US$915,000
- Box office: US$2,400,000

Ring of Bright Water is a 1969 British comedy-drama film directed by Jack Couffer and starring Bill Travers and Virginia McKenna. It is a story about a Londoner and his pet otter living on the Scottish coast. The story is fictional, but is adapted from the 1960 autobiographical book of the same name by Gavin Maxwell. It featured the stars of Born Free (1966), another film about a close relationship between humans and a wild animal.

== Plot ==
Graham Merrill passes a pet shop on his daily walks about London, and takes an interest in an otter (specifically, a male river otter) he sees in the shop window; eventually, he buys the animal and names him Mijbil or "Mij" for short. The otter wreaks havoc in his small flat, and together they leave London for a rustic cottage overlooking the sea on the west coast of Scotland. There they live as beachcombers, and make the acquaintance of Dr. Mary MacKenzie from the nearby village, and her dog Johnny. Mij and Johnny play in the water and bound across the fields together.

One episode involves Graham trying to find live eels for Mij, which is very difficult because during the winter the eels swim in deeper waters, making it tough to fish them out. Also, no fishmonger in town carries live eels.

Mij's inquisitive and adventurous nature leads him some distance from the cottage to a female otter with whom he spends the day. Ignorant of danger, he is caught in a net and nearly killed. The humans find him and help him recover. Graham spends a significant amount of time drawing Mij, but realises that to show the true agility of the otter he must draw it underwater. He builds a large tank out of old windows so that he can do this.

Not long after, Merrill goes to London to look after some affairs and leaves MacKenzie in charge of Mij. While being exercised afield, Mij is killed by a ditch digger, who did not realise he was a pet. Merrill returns and is crushed to discover the death of his beloved otter. Some time later, Merrill and MacKenzie are surprised by a trio of otter youngsters, accompanied by their mother otter, approaching the cottage. He happily realises they are Mij's mate and their children who have come to play in their father's swimming pool.

Graham has been trying for years to write a novel about the Marsh Arabs; however, after seeing the baby otters playing, he takes pen and paper and begins to write about Mij and what the otter has taught him about himself.

== Cast and characters ==
- Bill Travers as Graham Merrill
- Virginia McKenna as Mary MacKenzie
- Peter Jeffrey as Colin Wilcox
- Jameson Clark as storekeeper
- Helena Gloag as Mrs. Flora Elrich
- W. D. Joss as lighthouse keeper
- Roddy McMillan as bus driver
- Jean Taylor-Smith as Mrs. Sarah Chambers
- Christopher Benjamin as fishmonger
- Archie Duncan as road mender
- Tommy Godfrey as ticket seller
- Phil McCall as Frank
- Joyce McClain as stunt woman for Virginia McKenna
- Two Wisconsin otters owned and trained by Tom and Mabel Beecham of Phillips, Wisconsin portrayed Mij the otter.

== Production ==
Film rights were held by Michael Powell then by American producer Joseph Strick. Strick exercised the option in 1967. The job of directing was given to Jack Couffer. Gavin Maxwell was unhappy how he was depicted in the original script. However a compromise was reached which included giving the character based on Maxwell a new name. Maxwell subsequently came to admire the film.

The stars were Bill Travers and Virginia McKenna, who were married in real life. McKenna called the book "extraordinary and sensitive" and wrote she and Travers "had both been stirred, not only by the relationship the author, Gavin Maxwell, had with his otters, but by his deep love of nature and his awareness of the things which really are important in life. At least to us, too, they seemed important."

Part of the film was shot in Ellenabeich on the Isle of Seil.

Couffer later called otters "the most difficult animals of all to film. An otter’s face, although bright, seems fixed in its somewhat devilish expression. This was a problem because it was difficult to get different meaningful expressions. But to further our exasperation, we soon discovered that an otter is motivated by nothing as strong as its native curiosity, and when introduced to a strange location no sound, no food, no smell, no movement, seemed to overpower his vast capacity for exploration."

== Release ==
The film held its premiere in aid of the World Wildlife Fund on 2 April 1969 at the Odeon Leicester Square, attended by Prince Philip, Duke of Edinburgh.

== Reception and critical response ==
=== Box office ===
The film earned rentals of US$1 million in North America and US$1.4 million in other countries. After all costs were deducted it recorded an overall loss of US$615,000.

=== Critical ===
The Monthly Film Bulletin wrote: "Routine cuddly animal stuff, eminently suitable for family audiences to bill and coo over, and about which there is absolutely nothing to be said except that the otters are appealing, the photography is passable, and the almost non-existent story padded out interminably with cute incident."

Variety called the film "engaging" and noted "Travers and McKenna unselfishly subdue their performances to the star demands of the lolloping young rascal, Mij, but keep the interest firmly alive by their tactful playing."

The National Board of Review placed Ring of Bright Water on its list of the Top Ten Films for 1969.

The Daily Telegraph called it "one of the best-loved British films of all time."

== Comic book ==
Dell Comics published a comic-book adaptation of the film drawn by Jack Sparling in October 1969.

== Documentary ==
The documentary film Echoes of Camusfearna (1995) contains previously unseen footage of Gavin Maxwell with the otters, and is introduced and narrated by Virginia McKenna. It was released to DVD in 2007.

== Home media ==
DVD packaging (2004); the artwork differs substantially from the original film poster.

The film was released as a region 2 DVD in 2002, and as a region 1 DVD in 2004. Previously, it had been released as a VHS tape in 1981 and 1991.

== See also ==
- List of British films of 1969
