= Passionate Summer (1958 film) =

1958 film

- Original British quad poster by Renato Fratini
- Directed by: Rudolph Cartier
- Screenplay by: Joan Henry
- Based on: novel The Shadow and the Peak by Richard Mason
- Produced by: Kenneth Harper; George Willoughby
- Starring: Virginia McKenna; Bill Travers; Yvonne Mitchell
- Cinematography: Ernest Steward
- Edited by: Reginald Mills
- Music by: Angelo Francesco Lavagnino; Muir Mathieson (conductor)
- Production company: Harper-Willoughby
- Distributed by: Rank Film Distributors (UK)
- Release dates: 25 September 1958 (London, England)
- Running time: 101 minutes
- Country: United Kingdom
- Language: English

Passionate Summer (also known as Storm Over Jamaica) is a 1958 British drama film directed by Rudolph Cartier and starring Virginia McKenna, Bill Travers and Yvonne Mitchell. The screenplay was by Joan Henry based on the 1949 novel The Shadow and the Peak by Richard Mason.

== Premise ==
A British schoolteacher moves to Jamaica to teach after a tumultuous divorce, and meets an exciting new woman.

== Cast ==
- Virginia McKenna as Judy Waring
- Bill Travers as Douglas Lockwood
- Yvonne Mitchell as Mrs Pawley
- Alexander Knox as Leonard Pawley
- Carl Möhner as Louis
- Gordon Heath as coroner
- Guy Middleton as Duffield
- Pearl Prescod as Mrs Morgan
- Ellen Barrie as Sylvia

== Development ==
The film was based on Richard Mason's novel The Shadow and the Peak which was published in 1949. It was Mason's second novel, following The Wind Cannot Read, which the Rank Organisation had filmed with Dirk Bogarde. The New York Times called The Shadow and the Peak "diverting, it is humorous, it contains the necessary serious undertones."

In March 1950 it was announced that Alec Guinness was weighing up whether to appear in The Mudlark at 20th Century Fox or The Shadow and the Peak from J. Arthur Rank. Robert Hamer was to write and direct.

Guinness elected to make The Mudlark and there were reportedly issues getting the script approved by the censor. In December 1951 Hamer said producer Michael Truman would be going to the US in January to negotiate changes to the script with the Breen Office (the US censor). Hamer was to make the movie for Ealing and he wanted to star Vivien Leigh. Michael Balcon reportedly gave his approval, then changed his mind, worried about the film's erotic content. This led to Hamer leaving Ealing.

In December 1957 it was reported that film rights were owned by Kenneth Harper, who had offered the lead to Van Johnson, who had just made Action of the Tiger with Harper.

== Production ==
In March 1958 it was announced the film would be made in Jamaica and at Pinewood Studios under the title of Passionate Summer starring Virginia McKenna, Bill Travers and Yvonne Mitchell. McKenna was coming off two large hits, A Town Like Alice (1956) and Carve Her Name with Pride (1958). She and Bill Travers had married in real life in 1957. Filming began on 28 April 1958 shortly after production had started on another Mason adaptation, The Wind Cannot Read.

McKenna was pregnant during filming and it would be the last film she made for Rank (although she turned down a movie they wanted her to do afterwards).

Director Rudolph Cartier was under contract to the BBC but was released to Rank to make the film.

According to Bill Travers:

Neither of us [his wife Virginia McKenna] cared very much for Passionate Summer. Cartier was already an important person in television — that was how he got Passionate Summer – but I’m not sure that he translated well to the big screen. He did a lot of rehearsal, and, by this time, I’d begun to shed the idea of doing a tremendous amount of rehearsal. By then, I wanted to make things more natural and I found that Cartier was too bound by what had happened at rehearsal. I think the film needed something much more impressionistic than Cartier’s direction. It needed to be made like a French film. I also think that it was as a result of that film that Ginny and I became less than favourites with the Rank Organisation.

In the US, Passionate Summer was the name given to a French film starring Raf Vallone that came out in 1957. So the film was retitled in America as Storm Over Jamaica.

== Reception ==
=== Box office ===
The film was a box office failure. Travers later said that because of this he and McKenna became "less than favourites with the Rank Organisation."

=== Critical ===
Variety called it "the sort of glossy novelettish yarn that will do nothing for the reputation of the British film industry."

The Monthly Film Bulletin wrote: "any forebodings roused by the story outline of this film are thorough fulfilled."

In The Radio Times Guide to Films David Parkinson gave the film 2/5 stars, writing: "Noted television producer Rudolph Cartier best known for the Quatermass serials made a rare foray into features with this hothouse Rank melodrama, set in a sweltering Jamaica. ... Travers and McKenna may have been a real-life couple, but they really are the most unconvincing of screen lovers here."

Leslie Halliwell wrote: "Silly melodrama with splendid backgrounds ruined by poor colour."

Film academic Philip Kemp wrote the film "was scripted (flatly) by Joan Henry, directed (turgidly) by Rudolph Cartier and acted (stolidly) by Bill Travers and Virginia McKenna. If [Robert] Hamer hadn't long since been driven to drink, this film would have been enough to do it."
