= DogsBlog.com =

UK dog rescue website

- Formation: January 2007
- Region served: United Kingdom
- Official language: English
- Leader: Kim Bruce; Ryan O'Meara
- Parent organization: K9 Media Ltd
- Website: www.dogsblog.com

DogsBlog.com is a UK dog rescue website founded by Ryan O'Meara and Kim Bruce, and set up by K9 Media Ltd. It was launched in January 2007, and has since found new homes for over 21,000 dogs via the website which provides a free service for 212 different rescue shelters.

== Achievements ==
Ben, an 8 year old Shih Tzu, was the 2,000th dog rehomed via the website in May 2008. 3,000 dogs were resettled in new homes by November 2008 with a success rate of 75%; for every 100 dogs listed on the website, 75 were rehomed. Also during this period it had seen a big growth in web traffic, with a 334.98% increase in visitor traffic during the year.

The 4,000 milestone was announced on 14 March 2009 with both the 4,000th and 4,001st dogs, named Charlie and Millie, two German Shepherd cross Collie puppies. It was also announced at the same time that since its foundation, DogsBlog.com had relieved the animal welfare industry in the UK of more than £9,490,000 of financial strain.

The 6,000th dog adopted via the website was Ruby, an English Bull Terrier cross Staffordshire Bull Terrier in August 2009. The website has worked with the national media in the United Kingdom to change the public opinion of dogs in rescue centres.

== Campaign ==
DogsBlog.com ran the UK's first National Dog Adoption Month in August 2008. Kim Bruce from DogsBlog.com said "The campaign aims to completely dispel the myth that rescue dogs need pity or sympathy or that dogs in shelters are somehow there due to problems in their makeup, physical or emotional." A 227% increase in dog adoptions was noted during the month.

== See also ==
- Rescue group
- Petfinder.org
