= Cinnamon Trust =

UK charity

The Cinnamon Trust
- Formation: 1985
- Founder: Averil Jarvis
- Type: Charity
- Headquarters: Cornwall, England, UK
- Volunteers: 17,000
- Website: cinnamon.org.uk

The Cinnamon Trust is a UK charity providing support for elderly and terminally ill people with pets. The organization relies on volunteers to walk dogs, transport pets, and foster pets whose owners have difficulty caring for them. It also administers pet sanctuaries. It was founded by Averil Jarvis in 1985, and named after her corgi Cinnamon. As of December 2020, the charity reportedly had a network of 17,000 volunteers. Sir Paul McCartney and Virginia McKenna are the charity's patrons.
