= Born Free Foundation =

Wildlife conservation organization

- Founded: 19 March 1984; 42 years ago
- Founders: Virginia McKenna, Bill Travers, Will Travers
- Purpose: Compassionate conservation
- Location: United Kingdom
- Region served: Worldwide
- Website: www.bornfree.org.uk

The Born Free Foundation is an international wildlife charity that campaigns to "Keep Wildlife in the Wild". It protects wild animals in their natural habitat, campaigns against the keeping of wild animals in captivity and rescues wild animals in need. It also promotes compassionate conservation, which takes into account the welfare of individual animals in conservation initiatives. Born Free also creates and provides educational materials and activities that reflect the charity's values.

Born Free's head office is located in Horsham, West Sussex, in south east England. It also has offices in Kenya, Ethiopia and South Africa, with representatives in Sri Lanka and Australia. Born Free USA is a separate organisation based in the United States which adheres to the same objectives as the Foundation.

In the year to 31 March 2021, the charity reported income of £5.9m.

== Creation ==
In 1969, actors Virginia McKenna and Bill Travers, who starred in the film Born Free, made the film An Elephant Called Slowly. This featured an elephant calf called Pole Pole who was given to London Zoo by the Kenyan government of the day when filming finished.

In 1982, McKenna and Travers went to visit Pole Pole at London Zoo. After seeing her condition and mental distress, they launched a campaign to have Pole Pole moved to somewhere more suitable, with other elephants for company. In 1983, the Zoological Society agreed to move Pole Pole to Whipsnade Zoo, but following complications that occurred as part of the aborted relocation process, Pole Pole was examined under anaesthetic and, being unresponsive, was put down in the Elephant House.

Her death so deeply affected McKenna and Travers that in 1984 they launched a not-for-profit called Zoo Check with their eldest son Will Travers, supported by Founder Patron Joanna Lumley. Zoo Check was renamed the Born Free Foundation in 1991.

The foundation is served by a board of trustees, of which McKenna is currently a member. Will Travers is the charity's executive president, the president of the Species Survival Network (see below), a board member of Born Free USA, a board member of Ecoflix (a natural history online streaming infotainment service) and a Fellow of the Royal Geographical Society

== Current work ==
Born Free manages or funds projects in more than 20 in Africa, Asia, Europe and the Americas. It focuses on a number of working priorities: captive wild animal exploitation; trophy and canned hunting; wildlife trade; rescue, care, rehabilitation & release; community support and human-wildlife co-existence; compassionate conservation; UK wildlife protection; policy development and advocacy; and education.

It also operates its own sanctuaries: two big cat rescue centres at Shamwari Private Game Reserve, in South Africa, Ensessa Kotteh Wildlife Rescue, Conservation & Education Centre, in Ethiopia, and Bannerghatta tiger sanctuary, in India.

With the support of the public, the Foundation has invested heavily in conservation activities such as lion conservation in Kenya, tiger conservation in India, the protection of the world's most endangered canid, the Ethiopian wolf, as well as elephant, giraffe and rhino conservation, amongst other conservation activities.

== History ==
In 1985 following a Zoo Check investigation into conditions at Blackpool Tower Circus, exposed in the Sunday Mirror, an ongoing campaign was launched to ban wild animals in circuses, which contributed to this activity being banned in Scotland in 2017, and England and Wales in 2020. In 1986 an investigation into the mental state of polar bears in UK zoos reported that 80% were behaving abnormally, leading to 'Zoos Driving Bears Mad' headlines in the media.

In 1987, six rescued tigers were relocated from a beast wagon at Cross Brothers Circus in Kent, England, to 15-acre forest sanctuary in Bangalore, India.

In 1989, the Foundation (then known as Zoo Check) was commissioned by the European Union to undertake the first comprehensive census of European Zoos. Subsequent work led to the EU Zoos Directive which, today, requires all EU zoos to be licensed by the relevant national authority.

In the same year, campaigning by Zoo Check, together with others, led to the approval of an international ivory trade ban. Ongoing work by the Foundation throughout the 1990s and up to the present day, as a member of the Species Survival Network (a coalition of wildlife organisations established with Born Free's help in 1993 which works within the United Nations' Convention on International Trade in Endangered Species framework to reduce the negative impact of international wildlife trade), has sought to prevent efforts to weaken the global ban and to help bring in domestic ivory trade control measures in its support.

In 1992, the Foundation enabled three of the UK's last captive dolphins to be successfully returned to the wild in the Caribbean, while tighter UK standards (following a 1988 survey) lead to end of dolphinariums in the UK in 1993.

In 1992 Born Free began to support the world's longest running wild elephant study by Cynthia Moss and her team in Amboseli National Park, Kenya; made world-famous in the BBC TV series Echo of the Elephants. Support continues.

In 1993 the Zoochotic Report investigation by Bill Travers, backed by animal psychologist Roger Mugford, catalogued widespread, severely abnormal animal behaviour in zoos across Europe.

Long-term support for Orcalab's work to monitor wild orca in Canada began in 1994, the world's longest running study of wild cetaceans, support for which continues to the present day.

Born Free partnered with the Ethiopian Wolf Conservation Programme within the University of Oxford's Wildlife Conservation Research Unit (WildCRU) in 1995, a major ongoing initiative to protect the world's rarest canid.

Individual wild animal rescues continue, with a total of 50 lions, 19 tigers and 12 leopards rehomed in global sanctuaries.

In 1998 Born Free helped create a chimpanzee sanctuary on 100 acres of rainforest on Ngamba Island, Uganda, to rehouse dozens of orphan chimps rescued from the exotic pet and bushmeat trade.

Long-term support for eastern lowland gorilla conservation began in 1999 in Kahuzi-Biega National Park in Democratic Republic of Congo, support which continues to date.

Born Free Kenya was launched in 2002 to support Kenyan projects, including conservation, antipoaching patrols, snare removal, wildlife law-enforcement, community work and human/wildlife conflict resolution (HWC).

In 2003 the Global Friends education initiative was launched, providing resources to schools and communities in Africa and Asia, adjacent to the Foundation's wildlife projects.

The Satpuda Landscape Tiger Partnership was launched in 2004 to protect wild tigers in India, and support also began for the Last Great Ape Organisation, which tackles illegal wildlife trade and which, today, has expanded to become EAGLE (Eco-Activists for Governance and Law Enforcement).

Born Free provided help to develop the Lilongwe Wildlife Trust in Malawi in 2007 which rescues injured and confiscated wild animals, transitioning an old zoo into a genuine sanctuary.

In 2010, two captive bottlenose dolphins, rescued from a Turkish swimming pool, were returned to the wild in 2012 after months of rehabilitation.

The 2010 the Keeping Whales and Dolphins in Captivity in the EU report, published in partnership with Whale and Dolphin Conservation, revealed that many dolphinariums failed to meet minimal EU legal standards.

Also in 2010, following a public art exhibition in Nairobi entitled Pride of Kenya, the Foundation began assisting local Masai communities better protect their livestock from predation at night by designing and installing Predator Proof Bomas (night-time stockades) which reduce the threat of predation and subsequent revenge attacks against lions and hyenas by local pastoralists. Approximately 75% of the cost of each PPB is provided by the foundation with the balance coming from the community. So far, more than 350 PPBs have been installed at a total cost of circa $US1 million and night-time predation in PPBs is negligible.

Born Free helped establish the Zambia Primate Project in 2012 to rescue and successfully return to the wild hundreds of baboons and vervets, victims of the illegal wildlife trade. The verified post-release survival rate is now more than 90%.

An extensive lion conservation project was established in Meru National Park in Kenya in 2014, where Elsa the lioness was returned to the wild. From 2010 to 2020, Kenya's lion numbers increased by 25% to 2,500.

In 2017 the Born Free Foundation was criticised by The European Association of Zoos and Aquaria and the British and Irish Association of Zoos and Aquariums for a report on UK zoo animal welfare that "groundlessly conflates the keeping of animals at zoos with the exotic pet trade and travelling circuses". Within the press release, however, BIAZA and EAZA, stated that they would generally welcome three of the five principal demands identified in the Born Free Foundation's 'Beyond the Bars' campaign were legislation to introduce such changes: 1. Publication and independent review of summary statistics on causes of deaths of animals in zoos; 2. Establishment of a full-time and centralised independent zoo inspectorate to ensure consistency in licensing and inspection of zoos. 3. When considering planning applications for development of zoos and similar facilities, introduction of a mechanism to assess whether the animals' welfare is likely to comply with existing animal-keeping legislation and standards before permission to build is granted.

However, the two zoo associations' stated position was to continue to permit the pinioning of birds (mutilation to prevent flight), and to continue keeping and breeding elephants in captivity. This included the admission that they would still allow member zoos to import elephants which have been captured and taken from the wild, and for zoos to use an ankus (bullhook – sticks with curved, pointed, usually metal tips) for elephant management.

In 2018, with Born Free support, an Oxford University WildCRU expedition located a previously unreported population of rare lions in Sudan. In 2019, a Born Free trophy hunting campaign included a major report, Downing Street rally, 246,000-signature petition and award-winning Bitter Bond canned hunting animation, which has been watched by over 10 million online.

A new film, Creature Discomforts created with Aardman Animations in 2020, used people's experiences in lockdown to highlight the plight of wild animals in zoos, circuses, and dolphinariums.

In 2021 another film, Protect Them, Protect Us, narrated by Joanna Lumley, called for end to wildlife markets to help address the spread of zoonotic diseases and reduce the risk of future global pandemics.

Policy work by the Foundation, reflecting growing concerns amongst the British public and more widely, have assisted in securing a number of progressive legislative measures either being approved or proposed, including:

- A ban on the use of wild animals in circuses in England and Wales
- An end the keeping of dolphins in public display facilities in the UK
- Restrictions on the keeping of wild animals as pets
- The introduction of legislation to largely prohibit (with some modest exemptions) the UK's domestic trade in elephant ivory.
- Improvements to the required standards of and enforcement of the UK's Zoo Licensing Act (1981)
- A prospective ban on the import of hunting trophies of many wild species into the UK

In June 2021, the Community Leaders' Network that represents millions of rural Africans in six nations accused the Born Free Foundation "of waging a campaign of disinformation against trophy hunting that will damage African conservation activities, and undermine their human rights and livelihoods" in a press release. Focusing on a complaint made to the UK Charity Commission, community leaders further state that "Born Free Foundation's assertions that trophy hunting doesn't support local communities or conservation are "demonstrably false" and "misleading.""

Born Free fully cooperated with the Charity Commission's request for additional information and provided evidence to support its campaigning material. This included: specific publications and peer-reviewed reports on the issue of trophy hunting written by economists, conservationists, ecologists, psychologists and animal welfare experts; briefing papers from the International Union for the Conservation of Nature (IUCN), a membership Union composed of both government and civil society organisations of which Born Free is a member organisation, and which harnesses the experience, resources and reach of its more than 1,400 Member organisations and the input of more than 18,000 experts; and reports by the Intergovernmental Science-Policy Platform on Biodiversity and Ecosystem Services (IPBES) and the International Monetary Fund (IMF). Born Free also confirmed to the Charity Commission how its trophy hunting campaign and associated materials related directly to all of its charitable objects. The Charity Commission concluded that they were satisfied that the charity and its Trustees had demonstrated how the charity's campaigns and materials relate directly to all of its objects, and that the Trustees are assured of the accuracy of the material used for the charity's trophy hunting campaign. As a result, the Charity Commission have closed the complaint.

Born Free designated 2022, The Year of The Lion, in memory of its founder, Bill Travers, with the launch of a public art display entitled 'Born Free Forever' featuring 21 life-size lion bronze sculptures created by the Australian artists Gillie and Marc. The exhibition is located for the first three months of the year at Millennium Green, Waterloo, London. Subsequently, it traveled to Newcastle, SW England and Edinburgh for three-month periods.

== Current projects ==
The conservation projects Born Free supports or operates are:

- Pride of Meru, Kenya
- Pride of Amboseli, Kenya
- Ethiopian Wolf Conservation Programme, Ethiopia
- Satpuda Landscape Tiger Partnership, India
- Amboseli Elephant Research Project, Kenya
- Saving Meru's Giants giraffe and elephant conservation, Kenya
- Black and white rhino conservation, Meru National Park, Kenya
- Grauer's gorilla conservation, Democratic Republic of Congo
- Western Chimpanzee Conservation, Guinea-Bissau
- OrcaLab, Canada
- Western Chimpanzee Bulindi Chimpanzee & Community Project, Uganda
- Freeland Foundation, tiger conservation, Thailand
- Orangutan Foundation International, Indonesian Borneo
- ELRECO forest elephant conservation, Liberia
- Sangha Pangolin Project, pangolin rehabilitation and conservation, Central African Republic
- Wildlife Protection Society, pangolin conservation, India

The wildlife rescue and care projects Born Free supports or operates are:

- Shamwari Big Cat Rescue and Public Education Centres, South Africa (lions and leopards)
- Ensessa Kotteh Wildlife Rescue and Education Centre, Ethiopia (lions, cheetah, hyena, primates, tortoises and other wildlife)
- Ngamba Island Chimpanzee Sanctuary, Uganda
- Limbe Wildlife Centre, Cameroon
- Lilongwe Wildlife Trust, Malawi
- Zambia Primate Project, Zambia
- Arcturos Bear Sanctuary, Greece (European Brown Bears)
- Animals Asia, Vietnam
- Animals Asia, China
- Sangha Pangolin Project, Central African Republic
- Wildlife Emergency Response Unit, Malawi
- Orphan Bear Rescue Centre, Russia
- Born Free facility at Panthera Africa Big Cat Sanctuaryhttps://pantheraafrica.com/, South Africa (lions)
- Animantura Sanctuary, Italy (lions and tigers)
- UK wildlife rescue and rehabilitation, a small grants programme supporting centres nationwide (foxes, badgers, hedgehogs)
