= Virginia McKenna =

British actress (born 1931)

Dame Virginia McKenna DBE
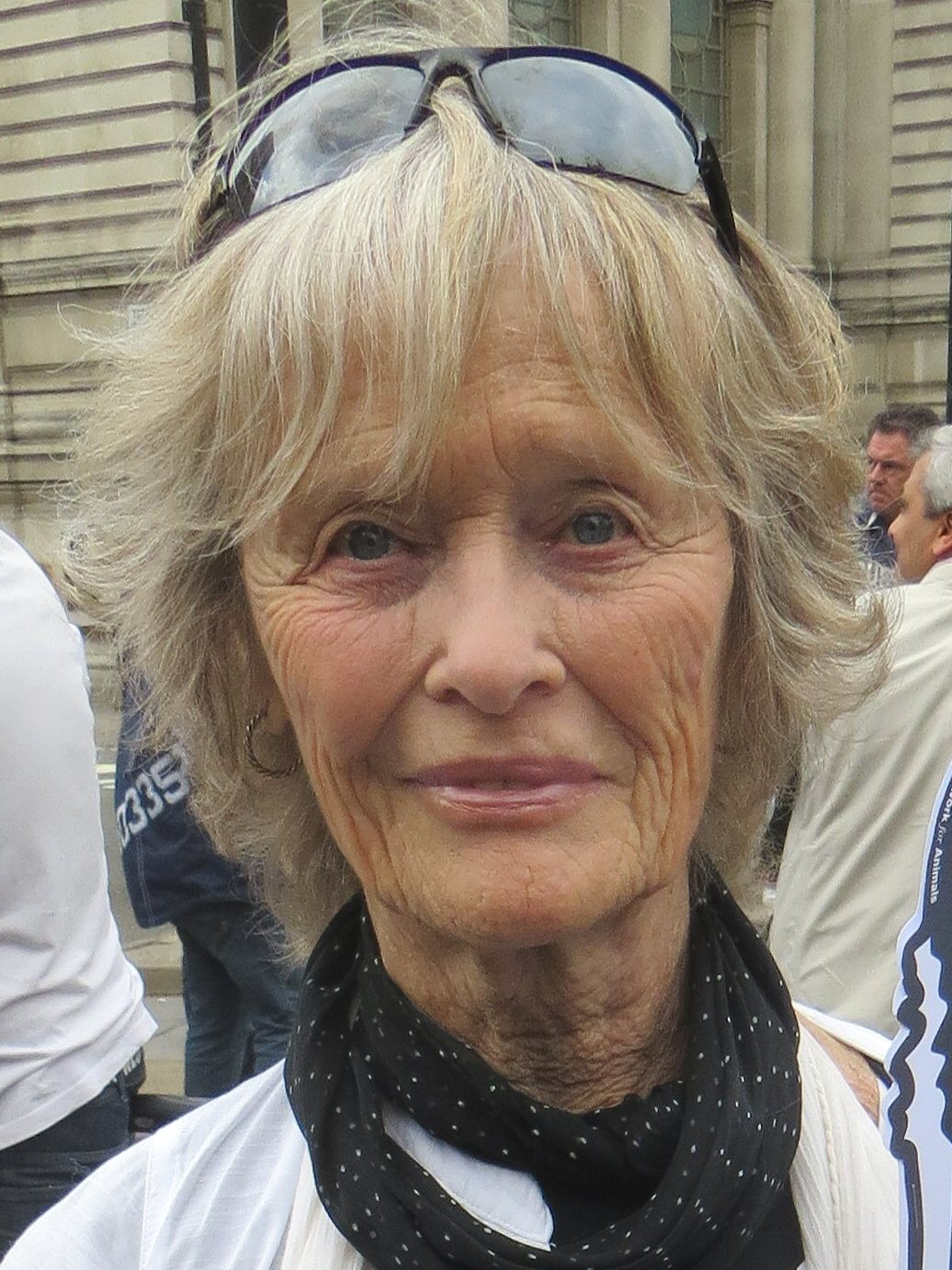
- McKenna at an anti badger cull demonstration, Westminster, London, June 2013
- Born: Virginia Anne McKenna; 7 June 1931 (age 95); Marylebone, City of Westminster, England
- Education: Royal Central School of Speech and Drama
- Occupations: Actress; author; animal rights activist; wildlife campaigner
- Years active: 1952–present
- Spouses: Denholm Elliott (m. 1954; div. 1957) Bill Travers (m. 1957; died 1994)
- Children: 4

Dame Virginia Anne McKenna (born 7 June 1931) is a British actress. She is best known for the films The Cruel Sea (1953), A Town Like Alice (1956), Carve Her Name with Pride (1958), Born Free (1966), and Ring of Bright Water (1969), as well as her work with the Born Free Foundation.

McKenna won the BAFTA Television Award for Best Actress in 1956. For A Town Like Alice, she won the BAFTA Award for Best British Actress in 1957, and in 1979 won the Laurence Olivier Award for Best Actress in a Musical for The King and I, making her one of the few to have completed the British Triple Crown.

== Early life ==
McKenna was born in Marylebone to a theatrical family and was educated at Heron's Ghyll School, a former independent boarding school near the market town of Horsham in West Sussex. She spent six years in South Africa before returning to the school at the age of fourteen, after which she attended the Central School of Speech and Drama, at that time based at the Royal Albert Hall, London.

== Career ==
Aged 19, McKenna spent six months at Dundee Repertory Theatre. She worked on stage in London's West End theatre, making her debut in Penny for a Song. She attracted attention on TV appearing in Winter's Tale with John Gielgud and Shout Aloud Salvation.

McKenna's first film was The Second Mrs Tanqueray (1952), followed by a comedy, Father's Doing Fine (1952). She had a small role in the popular war film The Cruel Sea (1953) and a better part in the low budget comedy The Oracle (1953). She received excellent reviews for her stage performance in The River Line. By June 1953, she was appearing in the West End production of William Douglas Home's The Bad Samaritan. From 1954 to 1955, she was a member of the Old Vic theatre company, appearing in Henry IV and Richard II.

McKenna returned to films with Simba (1955), a drama about the Mau Mau, playing Dirk Bogarde's love interest. Rank signed her to a long-term contract and director Brian Desmond Hurst said, "She has a terrific future, properly handled. She has all the qualities of a young Bergman and a young Katharine Hepburn. McKenna was also in The Ship That Died of Shame (1955).

=== Stardom ===
McKenna was given the lead role in the war time drama A Town Like Alice (1956), opposite Peter Finch. The movie was a big hit at the box office and McKenna won the BAFTA Award for Best Actress for her performance. Exhibitors voted her the fourth most popular British star. In October 1956, John Davis, managing director of Rank, announced her as one of the actors under contract that Davis thought would become an international star.

Travers and McKenna received an offer to go to Hollywood to appear in The Barretts of Wimpole Street (1957). Travers played Robert Browning and McKenna had the support part of Elizabeth Barrett Browning's sister. The movie flopped at the box office. The same year, Travers and McKenna, along with Margaret Rutherford and Peter Sellers, co-starred in the comedy The Smallest Show on Earth, made back in Britain.

McKenna had another hit with Carve Her Name with Pride (1958), playing Second World War SOE agent Violette Szabo. She was nominated for another BAFTA Award and was voted the fifth most popular British star of 1958 (and the ninth most popular regardless of nationality).

She and Travers were reunited in Passionate Summer (1958), which was a flop. It was her last film for Rank. Filmink argued "it was a great loss that she eventually parted ways with the studio (due to a combination of pregnancies and her unwillingness to do films on offer) – McKenna was a perfect female star for Rank and had a great warmth and ability to connect with audiences, far more than most of the studio’s late ‘50s female contract stars."

She had a support part in MGM's The Wreck of the Mary Deare (1959). McKenna and Travers were also in Two Living, One Dead (1961), shot in Sweden. She was in an adaptation of A Passage to India for the BBC in 1965.

=== Born Free ===
McKenna is best remembered for her 1966 role as Joy Adamson in the true-life film Born Free for which she received a nomination for a Golden Globe. It was not only a huge success at the box office but a life changing experience for her and her husband Bill Travers who co-starred with her, portraying game warden and conservationist George Adamson. The experience led them to become active supporters for wild animal rights as well as the protection of their natural habitat. McKenna and Travers starred in another animal-themed story, Ring of Bright Water (1969), made for her old studio of Rank, but it failed to match Born Free's success.

McKenna appeared in An Elephant Called Slowly. The film features her close friend conservationist George Adamson and also elephants Eleanor (brought up by conservationist Daphne Sheldrick) and young Pole Pole. The subsequent premature death of Pole Pole in London Zoo led to McKenna and her husband to establish Zoo Check in 1984 with their eldest son Will Travers. Zoo Check was renamed Born Free Foundation in 1991. In 1984 McKenna was involved with a protest against the poor conditions at Southampton Zoo which was closed a year later.

=== Later career ===
McKenna occasionally acted in films, notably Waterloo (1970), Swallows and Amazons (1974), The Gathering Storm (1974), and Beauty and the Beast (1976).

Onstage, in 1979 she won the Olivier Award for Best Actress in a British musical for her performance opposite Yul Brynner in The King and I. Over the years she appeared in more films but was also very active with television roles and on stage where she continues to make occasional appearances.

McKenna has been responsible for helping create and furnish the Gavin Maxwell Museum on Eilean Bàn, the last island home of Maxwell, an author and naturalist, most famous for his book Ring of Bright Water. McKenna and husband Bill Travers starred in the 1969 film adaptation of the book.

McKenna is still actively involved at Born Free Foundational as a Trustee.

== Honours ==
McKenna was appointed Officer of the Order of the British Empire (OBE) in the 2004 New Year Honours for services to wildlife and the arts and Dame Commander of the Order of the British Empire (DBE) in the 2023 New Year Honours for services to wildlife conservation and wild animal welfare.

== Personal life ==
In 1954, McKenna married the actor Denholm Elliott, whom she met on the set of The Cruel Sea. Their marriage ended owing to his affairs with men. In 1957, she married another actor, Bill Travers, to whom she remained married until his death in 1994. McKenna and Travers had four children together, one of whom is Will Travers. She is the grandmother of actress Lily Travers.

In 1975, McKenna released an album of twelve songs called Two Faces of Love, which included two of her own compositions and a sung version of the poem "The Life That I Have" from Carve Her Name with Pride. The record was released on the Gold Star label with two line drawings of McKenna by her sister-in-law Linden Travers, but these were replaced by a photograph when the album was reissued on the Rim label in 1979.

McKenna's audiobook work includes The Secret Garden by Frances Hodgson Burnett, and narration of The Lonely Doll by Dare Wright.

McKenna is a vegetarian. She is a patron of Cinnamon Trust, a national charity that helps elderly people to keep their pets.

McKenna's autobiography, The Life in My Years, was published by Oberon Books in March 2009.

== Awards and nominations ==
Year	Awards	Category	Nominated work	Result	Ref.
1956	British Academy Television Awards	Best Actress	—N/a (Note: The 1956 BAFTA for Best TV Actress honoured all of a performer's work for that year; no specific role was credited.)	Won	
1957	British Academy Film Awards	Best British Actress	A Town Like Alice	Won	
1959	British Academy Film Awards	Best British Actress	Carve Her Name with Pride	Nominated	
1967	Golden Globe Awards	Best Actress in a Motion Picture – Drama	Born Free	Nominated	
1976	British Academy Television Awards	Best Actress	Shades of Greene: Cheap in August	Nominated	
1979	Laurence Olivier Awards	Best Actress in a Musical	The King and I	Won	

== Filmography ==
Year	Film	Role	Notes
1952	Father's Doing Fine	Catherine	
1952	The Second Mrs. Tanqueray	Ellean Tanqueray	
1953	The Cruel Sea	Julie Hallam	
1953	The Oracle	Shelagh	
1955	Simba	Mary Crawford	
1955	The Ship That Died of Shame	Helen Randall	
1956	A Town Like Alice	Jean Paget	
1957	The Barretts of Wimpole Street	Henrietta Barrett	
1957	The Smallest Show on Earth	Jean Spenser	
1958	Carve Her Name with Pride	Violette Szabo	
1958	Passionate Summer	Judy Waring	aka Storm Over Jamaica
1959	The Wreck of the Mary Deare	Janet Taggart	
1961	Two Living, One Dead	Helen Berger	
1965	A Passage to India	Adela Quested	(TV)
1966	Born Free	Joy Adamson	
1969	Ring of Bright Water	Mary MacKenzie	
1969	An Elephant Called Slowly	Ginny	
1970	Waterloo	Duchess of Richmond	
1972–1973	The Edwardians	Daisy Greville, Countess of Warwick	BBC Television miniseries
1974	Swallows and Amazons	Mother	
1974	The Gathering Storm	Clemmie Churchill	(TV)
1975	Cheap in August: Shades of Green	Mary Watson	(TV)Thames Television Series
1975	Beauty and the Beast	Lucy	(TV)
1977	Holocaust 2000	Eva Caine	
1977	The Disappearance	Catherine	
1979	Julius Caesar	Portia	(BBC Television Shakespeare)
1982	Blood Link	Woman in Ballroom	
1992	The Lady in Waiting	Miss Peach	Short film
1992	The Camomile Lawn	Older Polly	(TV miniseries)
1994	Staggered	Flora	
1996	September	Violet Aird	(TV)
1998	Sliding Doors	Mrs. Hammerton	
2005	A Murder is Announced	Belle Goedler	
2010	Love/Loss	Mary	
2012	Leona Calderon	Elderly British Lady	
2016	Golden Years	Martha Goode	
2016	Ethel & Ernest	Lady of the House	(voice)
2019	Widow's Walk	Myrtle	
2020	Wings	Dora	Short film

== Non-fiction films ==
- The Lions are Free is the real life continuation of Born Free. This film tells about what happened to the lions that were in the film Born Free. Bill Travers, who had starred with McKenna, wrote, produced and directed the film, along with James Hill, the director of Born Free. Travers and Hill went to a remote area in Kenya to visit with the noted conservationist George Adamson. The film has scenes of George and Bill interacting with lions who are living free.
- Christian: The Lion at World's End is a documentary (with a re-enaction sequence at the beginning) about the now-famous lion's journey from a London store to George Adamson's reserve in Kenya. Virginia McKenna and her husband, Bill Travers, had a chance meeting with Christian and his owners Ace Bourke and John Rendall. Through McKenna and Travers' connection with George Adamson, the lion was successfully brought to Africa and taught how to fend for himself.

== Bibliography ==
- On Playing With Lions, (with Bill Travers) Collins, (1966) ISBN 0-00-241607-7
- Some of My Friends Have Tails, Collins (1971) ISBN 0-00-262752-3
- Into the Blue, Aquarian Press, (1992) ISBN 1-85538-254-7
- Journey to Freedom, (with help from Will Travers; illustrated by Nick Mountain) Templar (1997) ISBN 1-898784-73-6.

== Discography ==
- Two Faces of Love LP, Gold Star 15-030, 1975. Reissued as Rim RIM 5001, 1979.
- The Love That I Have (Violette)/Homage to Renoir 45 rpm single, Sovereign SOV 125, 1974.
- The Love That I Have/Send in the Clowns 45 rpm single, RIM 002, 1979.
