= Bill Travers =

British actor and activist (1922–1994)

Bill Travers MBE
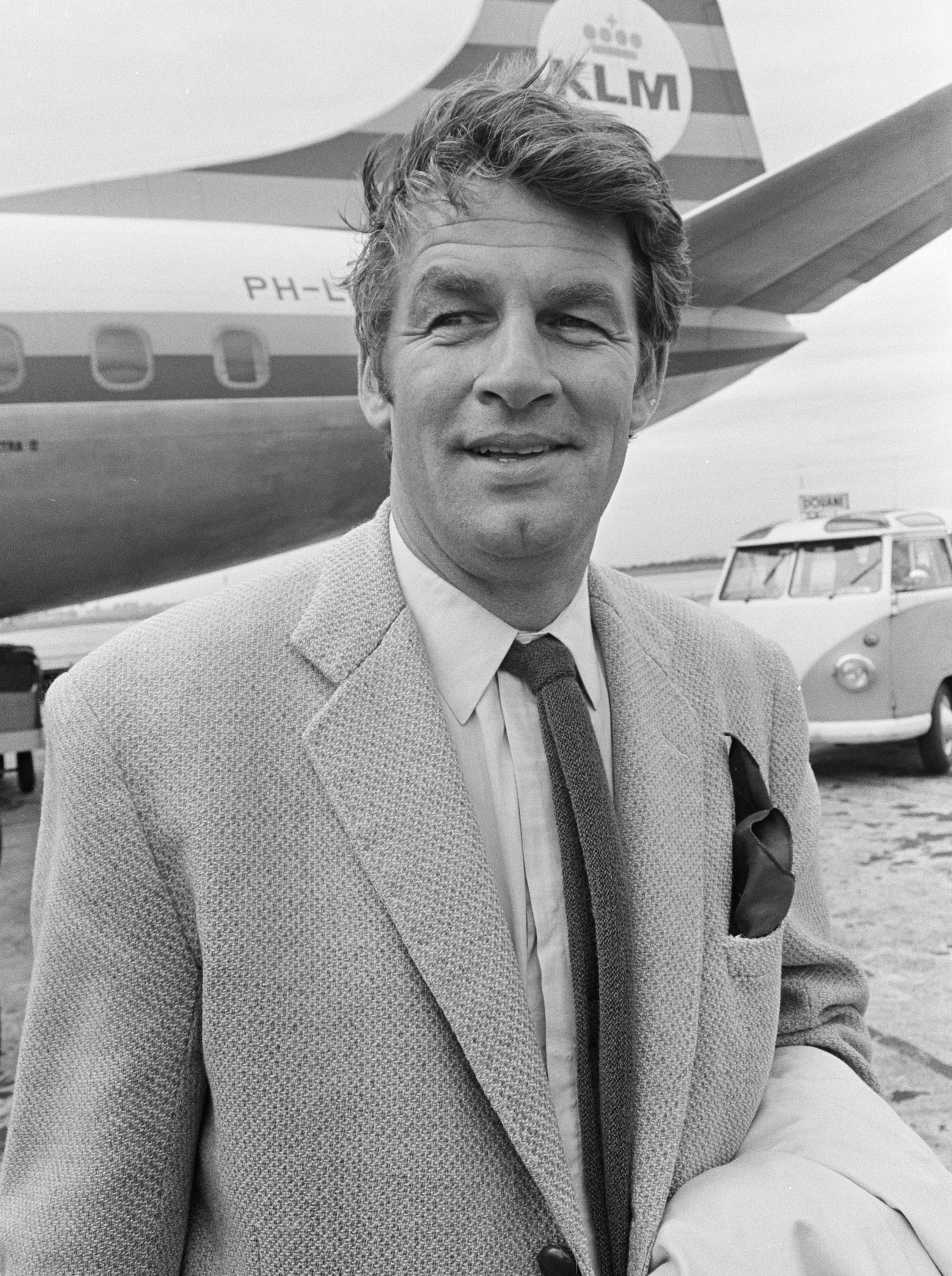
- Bill Travers in 1966
- Born: William Inglis Lindon Travers; 3 January 1922; Newcastle Upon Tyne, England
- Died: 29 March 1994 (aged 72); South Holmwood, Surrey, England
- Occupations: Actor; screenwriter; director; animal rights activist; soldier
- Years active: 1949–1992
- Spouses: Pat Rains (m. 1950; div. 1957) Virginia McKenna (m. 1957)
- Children: 5
- Relatives: Linden Travers (sister); Susan Travers (niece); Penelope Wilton (niece); Angela Morant (niece); Richard Morant (nephew)

William Inglis Lindon Travers (3 January 1922 – 29 March 1994) was a British actor, screenwriter, director and animal rights activist. Before his show business career, he served in the British Army with Gurkha and special forces units.

== Early life ==
Travers was born at 16 Grosvenor Road, Newcastle Upon Tyne, England, the son of Florence (née Wheatley) and William Halton Lindon-Travers, a theatre manager. His sister Linden (1913–2001) and her daughter Susan became actresses.

== Military service ==
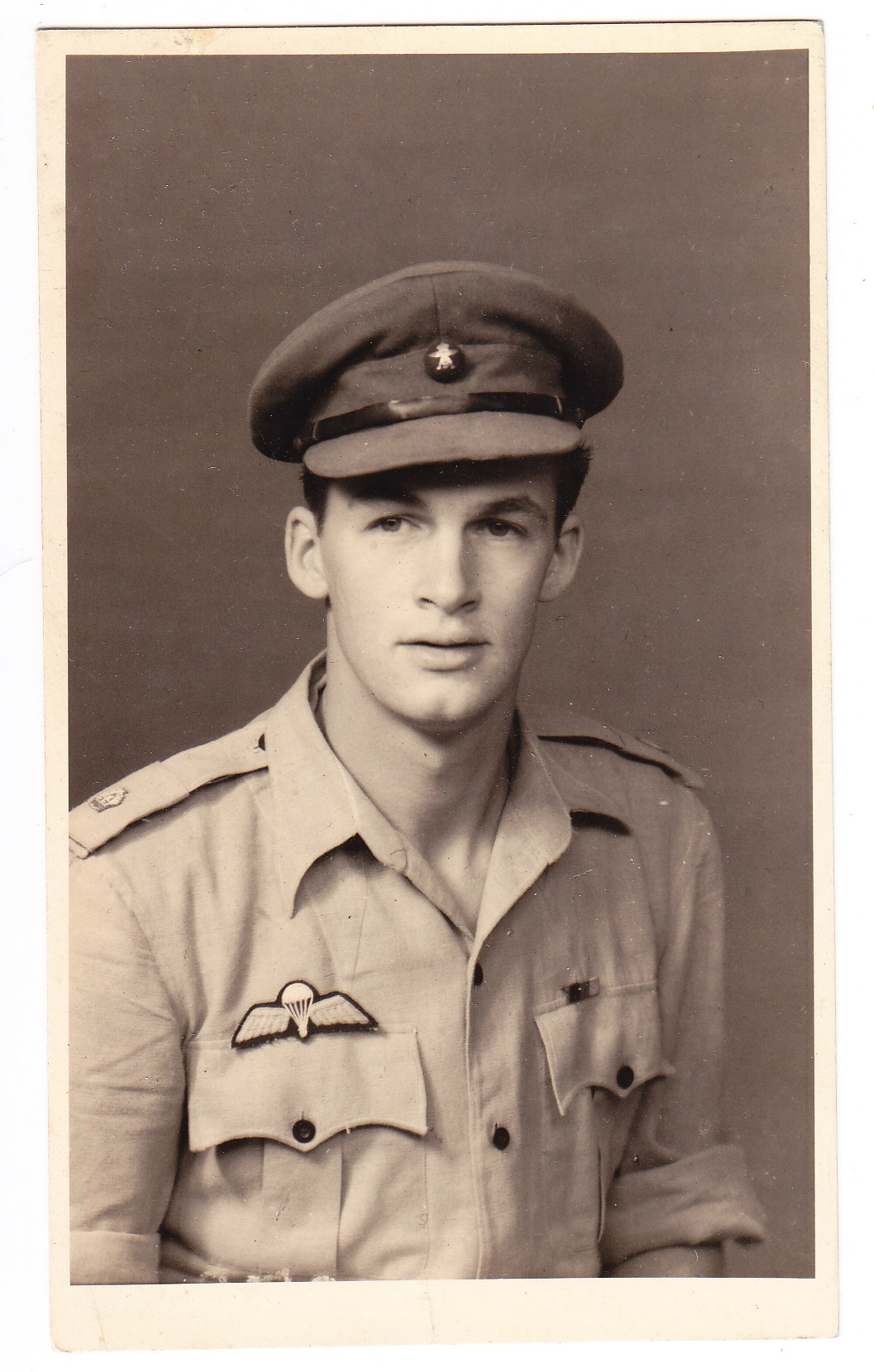
Major Bill Travers MBE

Travers enlisted as a private in the British Army at the age of 18, a few months after the outbreak of the Second World War, and was sent to India then under British Raj rule. He was commissioned a second lieutenant in the British Indian Army on 9 July 1942. He was promoted war-substantive lieutenant on 7 January 1943 and to acting major on 20 September 1944.

He served in the Long Range Penetration Brigade 4th Battalion 9th Gorkha Rifles in Burma, attached to Orde Wingate's staff, during which he came to know John Masters, his brigade major. (Travers later acted in the film Bhowani Junction, written by Masters.) While deep behind enemy lines, he contracted malaria and volunteered to be left behind in a native Burmese village. To avoid capture, he disguised himself as a Chinese national and walked hundreds of miles through jungle territory until he reached an Allied position. He later joined Force 136 Special Operations Executive and was parachuted into Malaya. He was responsible for training and tactical decisions with the main resistance movement, the communist-led Malayan People's Anti-Japanese Army (MPAJA). On 20 December 1944, he was promoted war-substantive captain and temporary major.

Travers was one of the first allied operatives to enter the Japanese city of Hiroshima after the dropping of the atomic bomb. He wrote about his experience in his diary, registering profound horror at the destruction and loss of life. On 7 November 1946, Travers was appointed a Member of the Order of the British Empire (MBE) "in recognition of gallant and distinguished service whilst engaged in Special Operations in South East Asia". He left the armed forces in 1947.

== Acting career ==
=== Early work ===
After leaving the army, Travers decided to become an actor. He began working on stage in 1949 appearing in John Van Druten's The Damask Cheek, and a year later made his film debut in Conspirator (1949). He had unbilled parts in Trio (1950) and The Wooden Horse (1950). He had a slightly bigger part in The Browning Version (1951) and a good role on TV in "Albert" (later filmed as Albert R.N.) for BBC Sunday-Night Theatre (1951).

=== Supporting player ===
Travers appeared in Hindle Wakes (1952), The Planter's Wife (1952), The Story of Robin Hood and His Merrie Men (1952), It Started in Paradise (1952), Mantrap (1953), Street of Shadows (1953), and The Square Ring (1953). He was in "The Heel" for Douglas Fairbanks Presents.

He was a supporting player in Counterspy (1953), and appeared in Romeo and Juliet (1954) as Benvolio, and in Footsteps in the Fog (1955) starring Stewart Granger and Jean Simmons.

=== Geordie and MGM ===
Travers's breakthrough came when he was cast in the title role of Geordie (1955), directed by Frank Launder. This was popular in Britain and the US and saw him contracted by Metro-Goldwyn-Mayer, which thought he was going to be a big star and brought him to Hollywood.

MGM cast him in the expensive epic Bhowani Junction (1956), with Granger and Ava Gardner. He followed this as the romantic lead in a remake of The Barretts of Wimpole Street (1957), opposite Jennifer Jones. Powell and Pressburger wanted him to star in the lead of Ill Met by Moonlight but the role went to Dirk Bogarde. Travers briefly returned to Britain to make a comedy, The Smallest Show on Earth (1957), with his second wife Virginia McKenna, whom he had married in 1957.

Back in Hollywood, he was Eleanor Parker's character's love interest in The Seventh Sin (1957), a remake of a Greta Garbo film. MGM tested him for the lead in Ben-Hur (1959) and he wrote a swashbuckler to star himself, The Falcon. However his MGM films all performed disappointingly at the box office – Barretts and Seventh Sin were notable flops – and enthusiasm for Travers in Hollywood cooled.

Travers returned to the UK in March 1957 to attend to divorce proceedings and marry Virginia McKenna after which he went back to America in October, for "A Cook for Mr. General" for Kraft Theatre (1958) on TV.

=== Return to Britain ===
Travers and McKenna starred in a melodrama for the Rank Organisation, Passionate Summer (1958). He tried to get up a war film set in Greenland, The Sledge Patrol, but it does not appear to have been made. He and Launder tried to repeat the success of Geordie with The Bridal Path (1960), but the film was not a success.

In the second half of 1959, Travers made a British monster film, Gorgo. In America he recorded "Born a Giant" for Our American Heritage (1960) on TV, then returned to Britain where Travers and McKenna reteamed on a thriller, Two Living, One Dead (1961). He then starred in a race car drama for MGM, The Green Helmet (1961), and a comedy with Spike Milligan, Invasion Quartet (1961).

He was in a Broadway production of A Cook for Mr General (1961). Travers starred in a TV adaptation of Lorna Doone (1963). He returned to Hollywood to do some episodes of The Everglades, Rawhide ("Incident at Two Graves") and Espionage ("A Camel to Ride"). Back on Broadway he played the title role in Abraham Cochrane which had a short run.

=== Born Free ===
His most famous film role was that of game warden George Adamson in the highly successful 1966 film Born Free. He co-starred with McKenna. This experience made him and his wife conscious of the many abuses of wild animals in captivity that had been taken from Africa and other natural environments around the world. They co-wrote about the experience in the book On Playing with Lions.

Travers received an offer to play a support role in Duel at Diablo (1967); during filming he broke a leg and dislocated a shoulder. He played the title role in a British TV version of The Admirable Crichton (1968), alongside his wife, and had a small part in Peter Hall's adaptation of A Midsummer Night's Dream (1968).

=== Documentaries ===
Travers teamed up with James Hill, the director of Born Free, to make the documentary, The Lions Are Free (1969), which both men directed.

Travers and McKenna made another "animal movie", Ring of Bright Water (1969) for which he also wrote the script. They followed this with An Elephant Called Slowly (1970), which Travers helped write and produce with James Hill, who directed. In 1969, he played Captain Hook on a stage production of Peter Pan.

Travers worked as an actor only on Rum Runners (1971) with Brigitte Bardot and Lino Ventura. He directed and appeared in a documentary, The Lion at World's End (1971), about Christian the lion, an animal bought in Harrods and then returned to Africa.

He was reunited with James Hill on The Belstone Fox (1973) and co-wrote a documentary, "The Wild Dogs of Africa", for The World About Us (1973). He later produced "The Baboons of Gombe" (1975) for the same show.

He and Hill wrote and produced The Queen's Garden (1977) together, and Travers helped produce Bloody Ivory (1980).

=== Later years ===
Travers appeared in "Tramps and Poachers", an episode of To the Manor Born (1980). In The First Olympics: Athens 1896 (1984) he and McKenna played the parents of Edwin Flack.

One of his last credits was "Highland Fling" on Lovejoy (1992).

== Animal rights campaigner ==
The importance of animal rights led to Travers and his wife becoming involved in the "Zoo Check Campaign" in 1984 that evolved to their establishing the Born Free Foundation in 1991.

Travers spent his last three years travelling around Europe's slum zoos. He made a TV documentary that exposed the appalling suffering of thousands of animals.

== Death ==
Travers died from a coronary thrombosis in his sleep at his home in the village of South Holmwood, near Dorking, Surrey, aged 72. He was survived by his wife and children. His widow, Virginia McKenna, carries on his work to help suffering animals, as does their son, Will Travers, who is president of the Born Free Foundation.

== Credits ==
=== Filmography ===
- Conspirator (1949) - Minor Role (undetermined, uncredited role)
- Trio (1950) - Fellowes (segment "Mr. Know-All")
- The Wooden Horse (1950) - Prisoner (uncredited)
- The Browning Version (1951) - Fletcher
- The Story of Robin Hood and His Merrie Men (1952) - Posse Man
- The Planter's Wife (1952) - Planter (uncredited)
- It Started in Paradise (1952) - 2nd Photographer (uncredited)
- Hindle Wakes (1952) - Bob
- Mantrap (1953) - Victor Tasman
- Street of Shadows (1953) - Nigel Langley
- The Genie (1953) - Morgan (segment "The Heel")
- The Square Ring (1953) - Rowdie Rawlings
- Counterspy (1953) - Rex
- Romeo and Juliet (1954) - Benvolio
- Footsteps in the Fog (1955) - David Macdonald
- Geordie (1955) - Geordie MacTaggart
- Bhowani Junction (1956) - Patrick Taylor
- The Barretts of Wimpole Street (1957) - Robert Browning
- The Smallest Show on Earth (1957) - Matt Spenser
- The Seventh Sin (1957) - Walter Carwin
- Passionate Summer, aka Storm Over Jamaica (1958) - Douglas Lockwood
- The Bridal Path (1959) - Ewan McEwan
- Gorgo (1961) - Joe
- Two Living, One Dead (1961) - Andersson
- The Green Helmet (1961) - Greg Rafferty
- The Invasion Quartet (1961) - Freddie Oppenheimer
- Born Free (1966, as wildlife expert George Adamson) - George Adamson
- Duel at Diablo (1966) - Lt. Scotty McAllister
- The Admirable Crichton (1967, TV Movie) - Crichton
- A Midsummer Night's Dream (1968) - Snout
- The Lions are Free (1969, Documentary) - Himself in the real-life sequel to Born Free.
- Ring of Bright Water (1969) - Graham Merrill
- An Elephant Called Slowly (1970) - Bill
- The Lion at World's End (1971, Documentary) - Himself
- Rum Runners (1971) - Sanderson
- The Belstone Fox (1973) - Tod
- How to Handle a Wine (1984, Documentary) - Himself / Dinner Guest

=== Television ===
- The Everglades as Rand in "The Hostage", syndicated US television series (1962)
- Lorna Doone, as John Ridd, 11 episodes (1963 TV series)
- Rawhide as Jeremiah O'Neal in "Incident at Two Graves" (1963)
- To the Manor Born, as Arthur Smith (Tramp) in Tramps and Poachers, 1980, series 2 number 4
- Lovejoy, BBC, two episodes 1992 (final appearance)
