= The Home-Made Car =

1963 British short film by James Hill

The Home-made Car
- Opening titles
- Directed by: James Hill
- Screenplay by: James Hill
- Edited by: Ann Chegwidden
- Music by: Ron Grainer
- Production company: British Petroleum Company
- Release date: 1963
- Running time: 28 minutes
- Country: United Kingdom
- Language: English

The Home-Made Car is a 1963 British short film directed and written by James Hill. It was produced by The British Petroleum Company (BP), which continues to distribute the film.

A young man rebuilds a vintage car and finds love.

== Plot ==
A young man sets to work restoring a vintage car at the home of his aunt. The little girl who lives next door is intent on sabotaging his project at any cost, but when he wins her over with a smile, she ends up helping him to build it. He completes the project and wins the hand of the girl's older sister, who has been dating a mannerless local who tears around in a sports car.

== Cast ==
- Ronald Chudley as young man
- Sandra Leo as little girl
- Frank Sieman as garage owner
- Caroline Mortimer as young woman
- Anthony James sports car driver
- Alice Bowes as auntie
- Ewen Solon as Rolls chauffeur

== Production ==
=== Locations ===
The film was shot largely in and around Farnborough, Hampshire, and Cove, Hampshire. The car was rebuilt at Blackwell Cottage, Cambridge Road West, Farnborough. The house remains, although the garage has been replaced by a detached house, now number 26. The house where the little girl lived, next door, is also still there. As well as Farnborough, parts of the filming took place at the petrol station in Bucks Horn Oak, Hampshire and Seale, Surrey.

=== The car ===
The owner of the Bullnose Morris in the film, Eric Longworth, kept the car until his death in 2011. The car is now owned by Stuart Cooke of Darwen Lancashire. When the film was shot, the car had already been fully restored, so the chassis of another car which Eric was restoring at the time, a rare 1916 Perry, was used to replicate the Morris during restoration.

The featured sports car, registration VWK 929, is a white late '50s Austin-Healey 100-6 with red interior.

=== Music ===
The music was by Ron Grainer and includes a pastiche of the theme from Steptoe and Son when an old rag and bone man tries to steal the front wings and radiator shell from the still incomplete car.

== Accolades ==
The film was nominated for a 1964 Academy Award (Short Subjects, Live Action Subjects), and won a Silver Bear (Short Film) at the 1963 Berlin International Film Festival.

== Cult success ==
The film became a cult success when regularly broadcast as a trade test colour transmission on the run up to the start of BBC2 colour transmissions. Originally screened from September 1968 until August 1973, it was one of a series of short films broadcast to help television engineers set up new colour television sets. Others were The North Sea Quest, Overhaul, Crown of Glass, Roads to Roam, The Small Propeller, The Cattle Carters, Prospect for Plastics, A Journey into the Weald of Kent, Giuseppina and Evoluon.

== Home media ==
The Home Made Car has been released by the BFI as an extra on DVD/Blu-ray discs of Hill's film Lunch Hour (1962), together with two short films from the 1970s also directed by Hill, Giuseppina and Skyhook.
