= Brinkley stick =

A Brinkley stick is a safety device used to discharge high voltage capacitors and ensure HT (high voltage) electrical circuits are discharged. The tool consists of a hook attached to the end of an insulated rod. The hook is connected by a length of insulated wire to a suitable ground or earth, often via a suitably valued resistor. It was named after Charles Brinkley (ca. 1871-1963) an amputee ferry boatman who carried radar staff across the river Deben.

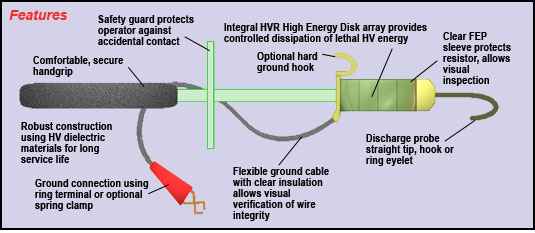
Brinkley Stick used to safely discharge electricity from electrical equipment.

One of the Trade test colour films, On the Safe Side includes a fictionalised sequence during which the life of a technician is preserved by his decision to deploy a Brinkley stick.
