= James Hill (British director) =

British filmmaker (1919–1994)

- Born: 1 August 1919; Eldwick, Yorkshire, England
- Died: 7 October 1994 (aged 75); London, England
- Other name: Jimmy Hill
- Occupations: Film director, television director, screenwriter, producer
- Years active: 1937–1993
- Known for: Documentaries, children's, feature length and short films, director of Born Free
- Awards: Distinguished Flying Cross; Academy Award; Berlin International Film Festival

James Hill (1 August 1919 – 7 October 1994) was a British film and television director, screenwriter and producer whose career spanned 52 years between 1937 and 1989, best remembered for his documentaries and short subjects such as Giuseppina and The Home-Made Car, and as director of the internationally acclaimed Born Free.

Hill also directed, produced and/or wrote such diverse films as Black Beauty, A Study in Terror, Every Day's a Holiday, The Lion at World's End (a.k.a. Christian the lion), Captain Nemo and the Underwater City, The Man from O.R.G.Y., and the children's television series' Worzel Gummidge and Worzel Gummidge Down Under.

== Life and work ==
=== Early career ===
Hill was born in Eldwick, Yorkshire on 1 August 1919 and attended Belle Vue Boys' School. He entered the GPO Film Unit (under the control of the Ministry of Information) in 1937 as an assistant, then served in the RAF Film Unit during World War II, receiving a DFC. He is said to have been the model for Donald Pleasence' character Flight Lt. Colin Blythe ("the Forger") in The Great Escape (1963).

After the war he became a documentary director, primarily of shorts, before graduating to feature length children's movies with The Stolen Plans in 1952.

In 1955 Hill entered a new phase with the documentary The New Explorers, sponsored by the BP oil company who (following Shell Oil's example) produced a number of industry-related, independently produced documentaries and shorts. Accompanying an oil exploration team around the world on its unsuccessful quest, Hill later wrote of his trek in the trade magazine Film User that he had "...travelled nearly 100,000 miles by car, jeep, train, liner, launch, dhow, canoe, catamaran, bicycle, aircraft, flying-boat, camel, helicopter, horseback and foot." Due to production costs and almost inaccessible locations the movie was shot on 16mm film, rather than 35mm film then in common use.

=== Mainstream ===
In the 1960s Hill expanded his scope and firmly established himself as a mainstream director. In the words of Richard Chatten of The Independent:

"The British cinema of the Sixties was littered with the bones of directors who showed promise in the field of documentaries and shorts but came to grief in features; but James Hill was one of the most conspicuous exceptions."

Beginning with The Kitchen (1961), based on Arnold Wesker's play, it was quickly followed by two John Mortimer play adaptations, Lunch Hour (1961), showing the dire consequences of a lunch hour romance, and the legal satire The Dock Brief (1962); both essentially two-hander plays. Every Day's a Holiday (1964), for which he also wrote the screenplay, was a teenage pop musical typical of the era.

At the same time Hill continued to make documentaries and children oriented shorts, including the immensely popular and Academy Award winning Giuseppina (1960), following young Giuseppina's interaction with the traffic that passes by and through her father's gas station in Italy. Another popular short, The Home-Made Car (1963), without dialogue, won two Berlin International Film Festival awards. Both films were regularly shown on BBC2 as Trade test colour films (a.k.a. fillers); in fact at 2:30 pm on 24 August 1973, Giuseppina was the last such film ever shown.

The year 1965 began with A Study in Terror, pitting an imaginary Sherlock Holmes against real life Jack the Ripper. Considered to be one of the best films of its genre, it boasted an impressive cast which included John Neville, Donald Houston, Robert Morley, Anthony Quayle, Barry Jones and Judi Dench.

=== Born Free and African wildlife ===
1965 was also the year of Born Free, an international hit starring Bill Travers and Virginia McKenna, based on the autobiographical book by Joy Adamson about Elsa the Lioness. In an interview with Doris Martin, writer Sid Cole reminisced: "On Born Free I remember getting a card from Jimmy Hill saying he was in Kenya entirely surrounded by lions. (laughter)." Filmed on location in Kenya over a period of 9 months, with George Adamson as technical advisor, the shoot had a profound effect on the participants.

Closely associated with Travers, McKenna and Adamson, Hill followed up with three docu/dramas related to wildlife in Africa which he either directed, co-produced and/or wrote: The Lions Are Free (1967) on the fate of the Born Free lion-actors, An Elephant Called Slowly (1969), and The Lion at World's End (aka, Christian the Lion) (1971).

=== Later work and television ===
In following decades Hill is best remembered for Captain Nemo and the Underwater City (1969), Black Beauty (1971), The Belstone Fox (1973), The young visitors (1984), and for the two children's television series Worzel Gummidge and Worzel Gummidge Down Under, almost all of which he either directed, wrote and/or produced.

Active in television throughout his career, his credits include episodes of The Human Jungle, Gideon's Way, The Saint, The Avengers, Journey to the Unknown, The Persuaders!, The New Avengers, and C.A.T.S. Eyes.

=== Marriage and death ===
James Hill was married to Lucienne Hill (30 January 1923 – 29 December 2012). He died in London on 7 October 1994, at the age of 75.

== Selected filmography ==
Year	Title	As	Notes
1949	A Journey for Jeremy	director	
1952	The Stolen Plans	director, writer	
1953	The Clue of the Missing Ape	director, writer	a.k.a. Gibraltar Adventure
1955	The New Explorers	director	for BP
1960	Giuseppina	director, producer, writer	a James Hill Production for BP see Awards below
1961	The Kitchen	director	
1961	Lunch Hour	director	composed main theme
1962	The Dock Brief	director	a.k.a. Trial and Error (US) starring Peter Sellers and Richard Attenborough
1963	The Home-Made Car	director, writer, producer	a James Hill Production; see Awards below
1964	Every Day's a Holiday	director, screenplay	aka Seaside Swingers (US), The Adventures of Tim (UK: video title)
1964	The Golden Head	co-director	with Richard Thorpe
1965	A Study in Terror	director	a.k.a. Fog
1965	Born Free	director	see Awards below; trailer, Fandango.com:
1967	The Lions Are Free	director, writer, producer	trailer, videoemo.com
1967	Die Hölle von Macao/The Corrupt Ones	director	a.k.a. The Peking Medallion
1967	An Elephant Called Slowly	director, writer, producer	
1969	Captain Nemo and the Underwater City	director	
1970	The Man from O.R.G.Y.	director	aka, The Real Gone Girls
1971	The Lion at World's End	writer, producer	aka, Christian the lion
1971	Black Beauty	director, additional dialogue	
1973	Jane Goodall and the World of Animal Behavior: The Wild Dogs of Africa	producer	
1973	The Belstone Fox	director, writer	a.k.a. Free Spirit
1975	The Man from Nowhere	director	
1976	London Conspiracy	director	
1979–1981	Worzel Gummidge	director, producer	children's TV series
1980	The Wild and the Free	director	
1983	Owain Glendower, Prince of Wales (TV)	director, writer	
1984	The Young Visiters	director, screenplay, producer	
1987–1989	Worzel Gummidge Down Under	director, writer	children's series, directed 16 episodes, wrote 3

Hill appeared as himself in:

- The Lion at World's End (1971) a.k.a. Christian the Lion (US)
- Without Walls Documentary (1992), episode "The Avengers"
- Avenging the Avengers Documentary (archival footage) (2000)

== Awards ==
Year	Status	Award	Category / Title
1960	Won	Academy Award	Best Documentary, Short Subjects for: Giuseppina (1960)
1963	Won	Berlin International Film Festival: Silver Bear	Special Prize: Short Film for: The Home-Made Car (1963)
1963	Honorable Mention	Berlin International Film Festival: Youth Film Award	Best Short Film Suitable for Young People for: The Home-Made Car (1963)
1964	Nominated	Academy Award: Oscar	Best Short Subject, Live Action Subjects for: The Home-Made Car (1963)
1967	Nominated	Directors Guild of America: DGA Award	Outstanding Directorial Achievement in Motion Pictures for: Born Free (1966)
1980	Nominated	BAFTA TV Award	'Harlequin' (Drama/Light Entertainment) for: Worzel Gummidge (1979)
1981	Nominated	BAFTA TV Award	'Harlequin' (Drama/Light Entertainment) for: Worzel Gummidge (1979)
1982	Nominated	BAFTA TV Award	'Harlequin' (Drama/Light Entertainment) for: Worzel Gummidge (1979)
