= Violet Trefusis =

English socialite and author (1894–1972)

- Trefusis in 1920
- Born: Violet Keppel; 6 June 1894; London, England
- Died: 29 February 1972 (aged 77) near Florence, Italy
- Occupations: Novelist, radio broadcaster
- Spouse: Denys Trefusis (m. 1919; died 1929)
- Partner(s): Vita Sackville-West; Winnaretta Singer
- Parent(s): George Keppel; Alice Edmonstone
- Relatives: Queen Camilla (grandniece)

Violet Trefusis (née Keppel; 6 June 1894 – 29 February 1972) was an English socialite and author. She is chiefly remembered for her lengthy affair with the writer Vita Sackville-West that both women continued after their respective marriages. It was featured in novels by both parties; in Virginia Woolf's novel Orlando: A Biography; and in many letters and memoirs of the period roughly from 1912 to 1922. She may have been the inspiration for aspects of the character Lady Montdore in Nancy Mitford's Love in a Cold Climate and of Muriel in Harold Acton's The Soul's Gymnasium (1982).

Trefusis herself wrote many novels, as well as non-fiction works, both in English and in French. Although some of her books sold well, others went unpublished, and her overall critical heritage remains lukewarm.

== Early life ==
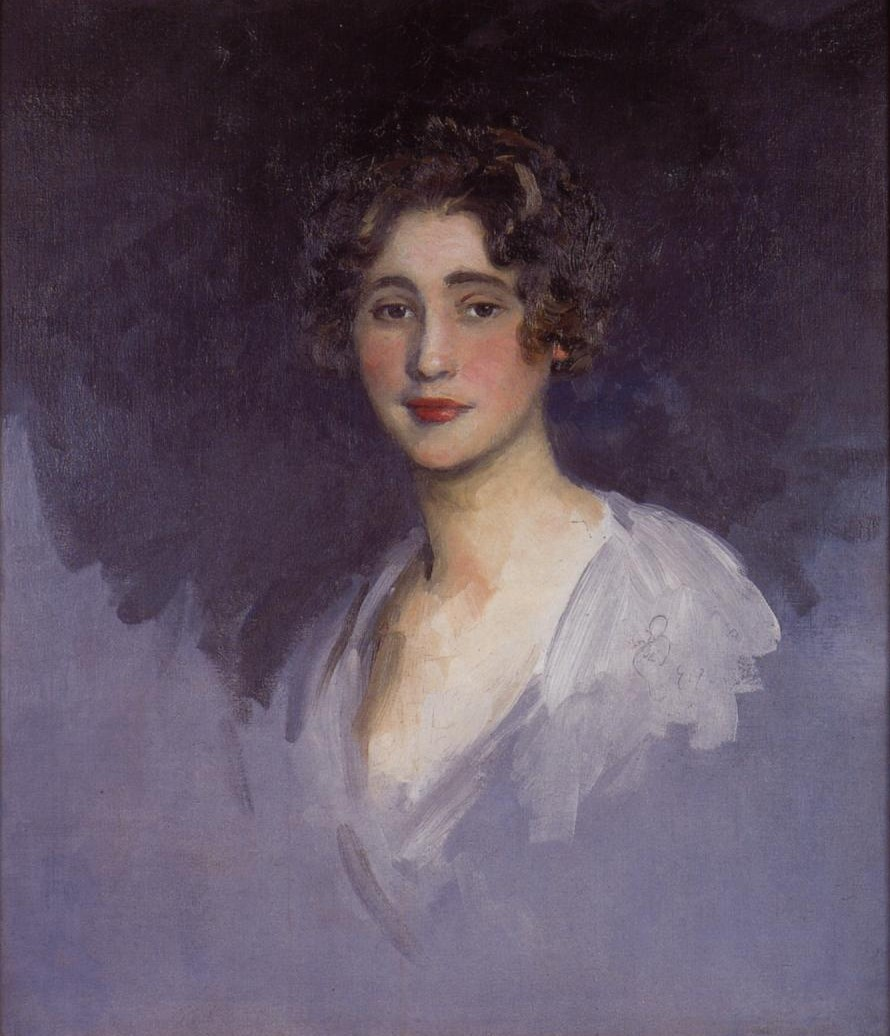
Violet Keppel, 1919, William Bruce Ellis Ranken

Born Violet Keppel, she was the daughter of Alice Keppel, who was married to George Keppel, a son of the 7th Earl of Albemarle. Members of the Keppel family thought her biological father was William Beckett, subsequently 2nd Baron Grimthorpe, a banker and MP for Whitby.

Violet lived her early youth in London, where her family had a house in Portman Square. When she was four years old, her mother became the favourite mistress of Albert Edward ("Bertie"), the Prince of Wales, who succeeded to the throne as King Edward VII on 22 January 1901. He paid visits to the Keppel household in the afternoon around tea-time on a regular basis until the end of his life in 1910. (George Keppel, who was aware of the affair, was conveniently absent at these times.)

In 1900, Violet's only sibling, Sonia Rosemary, was born. Sonia was the maternal grandmother (and Violet therefore the great-aunt) of Queen Camilla, consort of King Charles III.

== Career ==
During the Second World War in London, Trefusis participated in the broadcasting of "La France Libre", which earned her a Legion d'Honneur after the war; she was also made a Commander of the Order of Merit of the Italian Republic.

Trefusis received mixed reviews on her books. Some critics credited Trefusis with an "excellent gift of observation" and a "talent for mimicry and flair for decor in most of her books". These qualities were said to be evident in her novels written in English and in French. Other critics stated that her books were not great literature, although they sold well and her readers enjoyed them.

She made many appearances as a pivotal character in other writers' fiction. Nancy Mitford based Lady Montdore, a character in her novel Love in a Cold Climate, on Trefusis. She featured in Cyril Connolly's The Rock Pool, in Harold Acton's The Soul's Gymnasium as Muriel, in several novels by Vita Sackville-West, and in Virginia Woolf's Orlando: A Biography as the ravishing "Princess Sasha".

Although her writings spanned much of the twentieth century, many were unpublished. Virago, a publishing house devoted to recovering the forgotten work of women writers, set about compensating for this. They brought out two of her novels with introductions by Lorna Sage and Lisa St Aubin de Teran, but were eventually defeated by copyright difficulties. In addition, Lorna Sage, Trefusis' great champion among British critics, died before she could assist in the publication of further works by Trefusis, as she planned.

== Later life in France ==
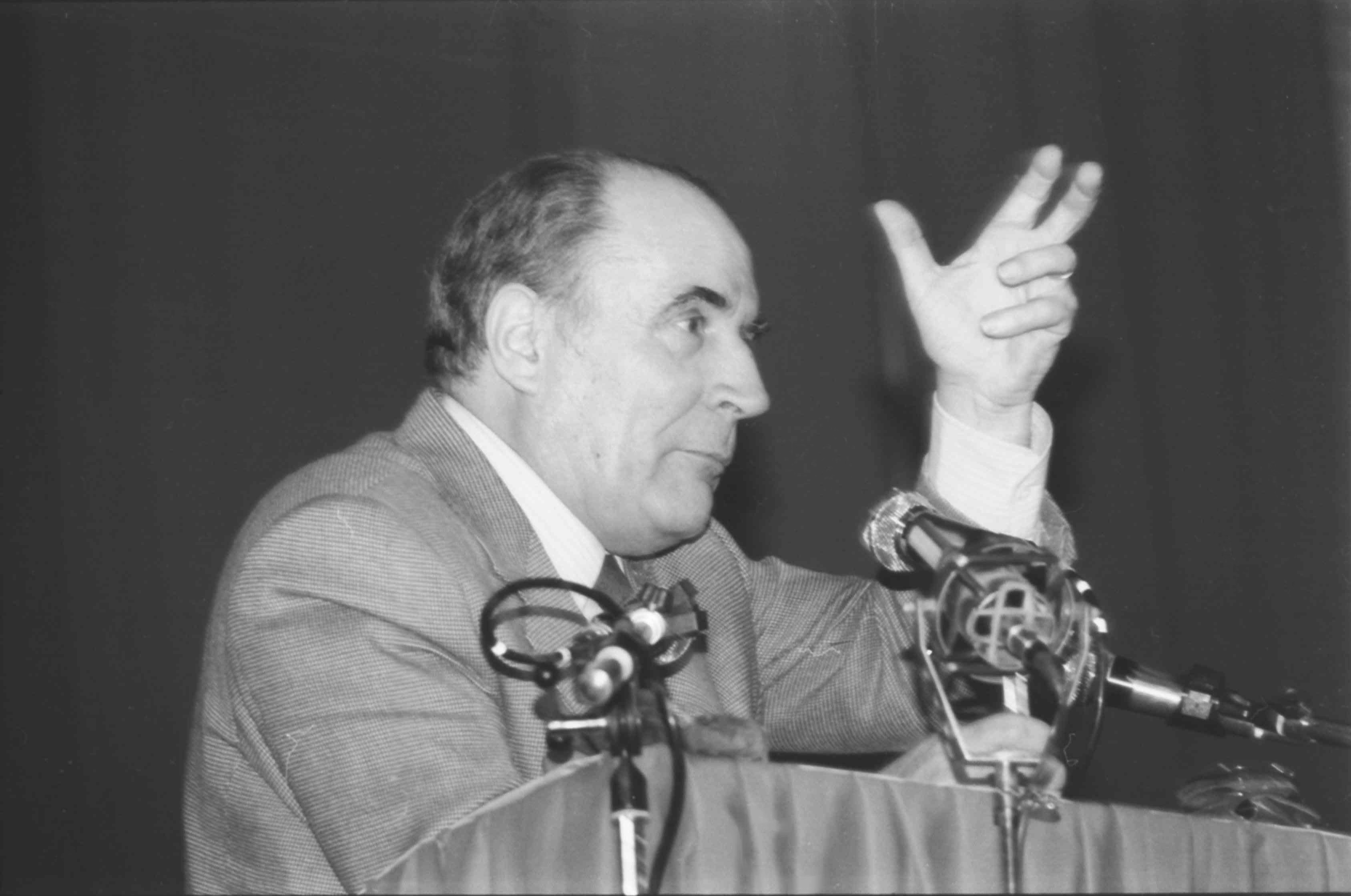
President François Mitterrand, one of Trefusis's close friends

From 1923 on, Trefusis was one of the many lovers of the Singer sewing machine heiress Winnaretta Singer, daughter of Isaac Singer and wife of the homosexual Prince Edmond de Polignac, who introduced her to the artistic beau-monde in Paris. Trefusis conceded more and more to her mother's model of being "socially acceptable" but, at the same time, not wavering in her sexuality. Singer, like Sackville-West before her, dominated the relationship, though apparently to mutual satisfaction. The two were together for many years and seem to have been content. Trefusis's mother, Alice Keppel, did not object to this affair, most likely because of Singer's wealth and power, and the fact that Singer carried on the affair in a much more disciplined way. Trefusis seemed to prefer the role of the submissive and therefore fitted well with Singer, who, whip in hand, was typically dominant and in control in her relationships. Neither was completely faithful during their long affair, but, unlike Trefusis's affair with Sackville-West, this seems to have had no negative effect on their understanding.

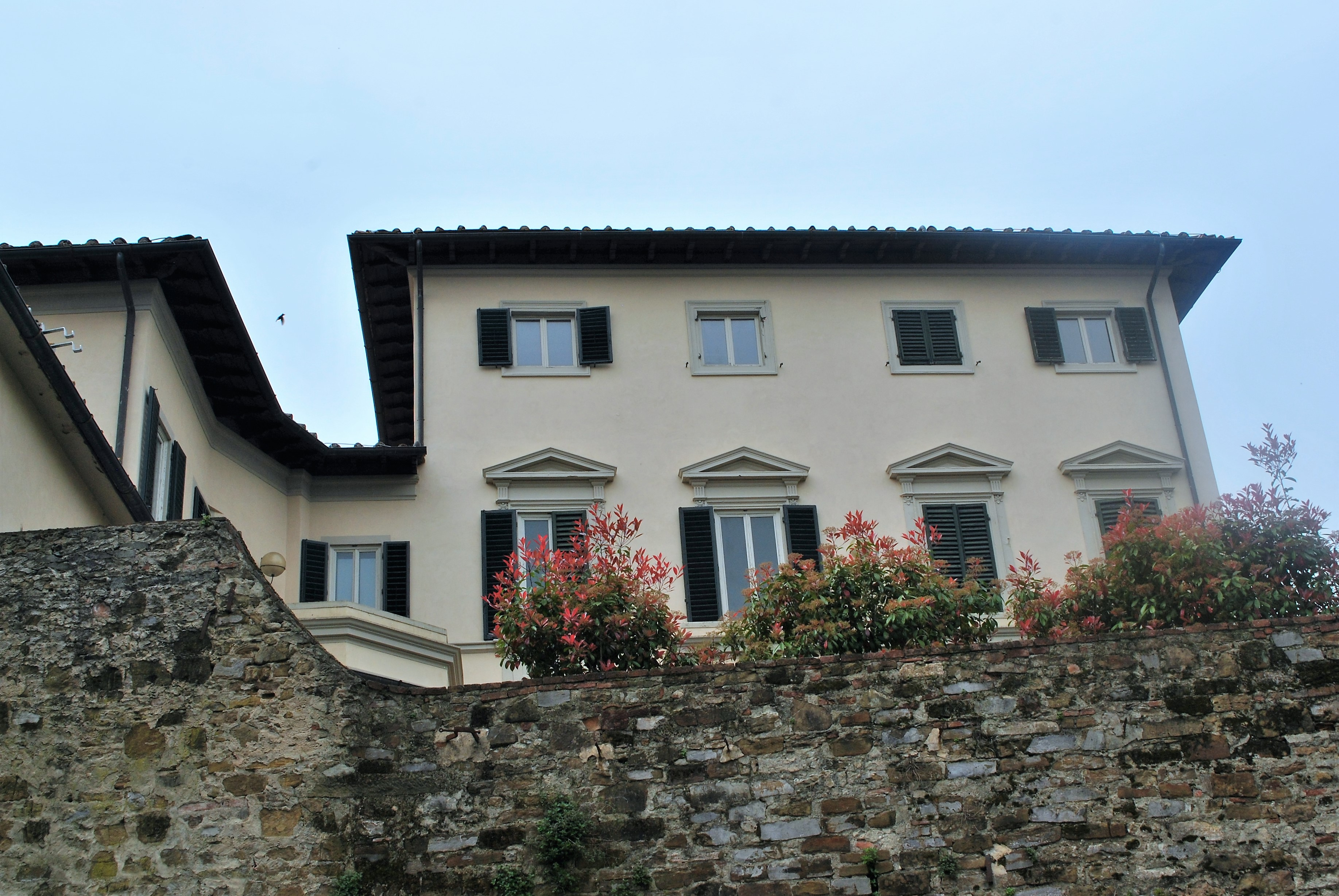
Villa dell'Ombrellino, Florence, Italy

In 1924, Mrs Keppel bought L'Ombrellino, a large villa overlooking Florence, where Galileo Galilei had once lived. After her parents' death in 1947, Trefusis would become the chatelaine of L'Ombrellino till the end of her life. Denys Trefusis died in 1929, completely estranged from his seemingly unfeeling wife. After his death, Trefusis published several novels, some in English, some in French, that she had written in her medieval "Tour" in Saint-Loup-de-Naud, Seine-et-Marne, France—a gift from Winnaretta.

American journalist Joseph Alsop recounts a meeting with Trefusis in Florence in his autobiography. "Mrs. Trefusis's enthusiasms had long since inspired the rhyme 'Mrs Trefusis never refuses.' Governor Olson, as it turned out was not refused ... they were much cheered up by one another."

Nancy Mitford said that Trefusis's autobiography should be titled Here Lies Violet Trefusis, and partly based the character of Lady Montdore in Love in a Cold Climate on her.

In his 1975 essay collection La Paille & le Grain, François Mitterrand, who later became President of France in 1981, mentions his friendship with Trefusis under 2 March 1972, when he received "the telegram" informing of her death. He goes on to discuss how, before Christmas 1971, he went to Florence to visit her as he knew she was in her last months of life: he had dinner with her and Frank Ashton-Gwatkin, who was a senior Foreign Office official at the beginning of the Second World War, at her house in Florence.

== Personal life ==
Trefusis is best remembered for her love affair with the wealthy Vita Sackville-West. Virginia Woolf described this by analogy in her 1928 novel Orlando. In this romanticized biography of Sackville-West, Trefusis is represented by the Russian princess Sasha.

The two women both wrote fictional accounts that referred to this love affair (Challenge by Sackville-West, and Broderie Anglaise, a roman à clef in French by Trefusis). Sackville-West's son Nigel Nicolson wrote the non-fiction Portrait of a Marriage (1973), based on material from his mother's letters, and adding extensive "clarifications", including some of his father's point of view. Such works explored other aspects of the affair. Aspects of Trefusis' character also featured in other novels, including Lady Montdore in Nancy Mitford's Love in a Cold Climate (1949), and Muriel in Harold Acton's The Soul's Gymnasium.

Vita Sackville-West in 1916

Each of the participants left extensive written accounts in surviving letters and diaries. Alice Keppel, Victoria Sackville-West, Harold Nicolson, Denys Trefusis and Pat Dansey also left documents that referred to the affair. (Note: The Yale University Library contains correspondence, writings and other materials by or related to Violet Trefusis. The correspondence consists of approximately 500 letters from Trefusis to John Phillips written in the 1960s. Also included are letters to Trefusis from her mother, Alice Keppel, her sister, Sonia Keppel, and several governmental departments in France and England concerning Trefusis's re-entry into France after the Second World War, and her nomination to the Légion d'honneur. Writings include holograph and typescript drafts of Trefusis' memoirs, novels, plays, etc. Other materials include a miniature case portrait of Trefusis as a child, and an album containing photographs of friends of the Keppels, taken by George Keppel between 1924 and 1939 at the family's Villa dell'Ombrellino in Florence, including many members of European nobility and royalty.)

Diana Souhami's Mrs Keppel and her Daughter (1997) provides an overview of the affair and of the main actors in the drama. When Violet was 10, she met Vita (who was two years older) for the first time. After that, they attended the same school for several years and soon recognised a bond between them. When Violet was 14, she confessed her love to Vita and gave her a ring. In 1910, after the death of Edward VII, Mrs Keppel made her family observe a "discretion" leave of about two years before re-establishing themselves in British society. When they returned to London, the Keppels moved to a house in Grosvenor Street. At that time, Violet learned that Vita was soon to be engaged to Harold Nicolson and was involved in an affair with Rosamund Grosvenor. Violet made it clear that she still loved Vita, but became engaged to make Vita jealous. This did not stop Vita from marrying Harold (in October 1913), who was also bisexual. Vita and Harold maintained an open marriage.

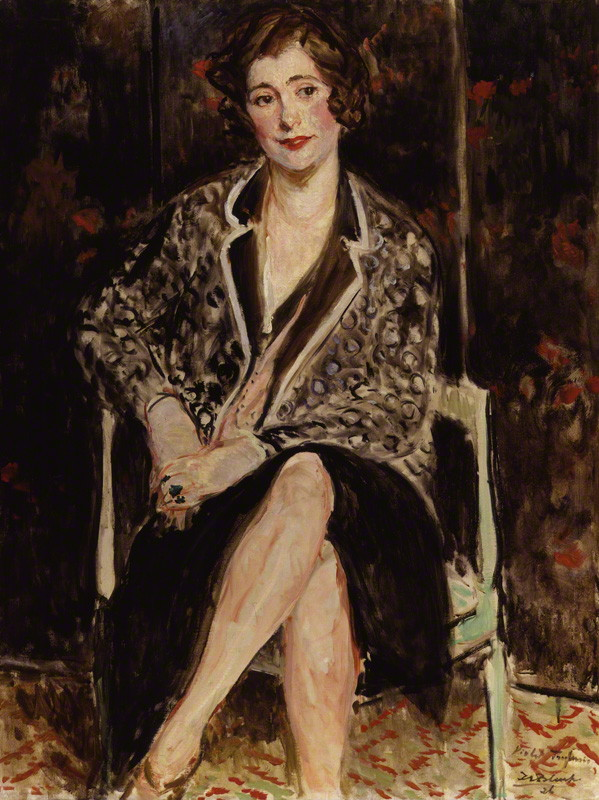
Violet Trefusis by Jacques-Emile Blanche (1861–1942), oil on canvas/NPG 5229, 1926

In April 1918, Violet and Vita refreshed and intensified their bond. By that time Vita had two sons, but she left them in the care of others while she and Violet took a holiday in Cornwall. Meanwhile, Mrs Keppel was busy arranging a marriage for Violet with Denys Robert Trefusis (1890–1929), son of Colonel Hon. John Schomberg Trefusis (son of the 19th Baron Clinton) and Eva Louisa Bontein. A few days after the Armistice, Violet and Vita went to France for several months. Because of Vita's exclusive claim, and her own loathing of marriage, Violet made Denys promise never to have sex with her as a condition for marriage. He apparently agreed, for on 16 June 1919 they married. At the end of that year, Violet and Vita made a new two-month excursion to France: ordered to do so by his mother-in-law, Denys retrieved Violet from the south of France when new gossip about her and Sackville-West's loose behaviour began to reach London. The next time they left, in February 1920, was to be the final elopement. Harold and Denys pursued the women, flying to France in a two-seater aeroplane. The couples had heated scenes in Amiens.

The climax came when Harold told Vita that Violet had been unfaithful to her (with Denys). Violet tried to explain, and assured Vita of her innocence. Vita was much too angry and upset to listen, and fled saying she couldn't bear to see Violet for at least two months. Six weeks later Vita returned to France to meet Violet. Mrs Keppel desperately tried to keep the scandal away from London, where Violet's sister, Sonia, was about to be married (to Roland Cubitt). Violet spent much of 1920 abroad, clinging desperately to Vita via continuous letters. In January 1921, Vita and Violet made a final journey to France, where they spent six weeks together. At this time, Harold threatened to break off the marriage if Vita continued her escapades. When Vita returned to England in March, it was practically the end of the affair. Violet was sent to Italy; and, from there she wrote her last desperate letters to their mutual friend Pat Dansey, having been forbidden from writing directly to Vita. At the end of the year, Violet had to face the facts and start to build her life from scratch.

The two former lovers met again in 1940, after the progress of the Second World War forced Trefusis to return to Britain. The women continued to keep in touch and send each other affectionate letters.

== Death and legacy ==
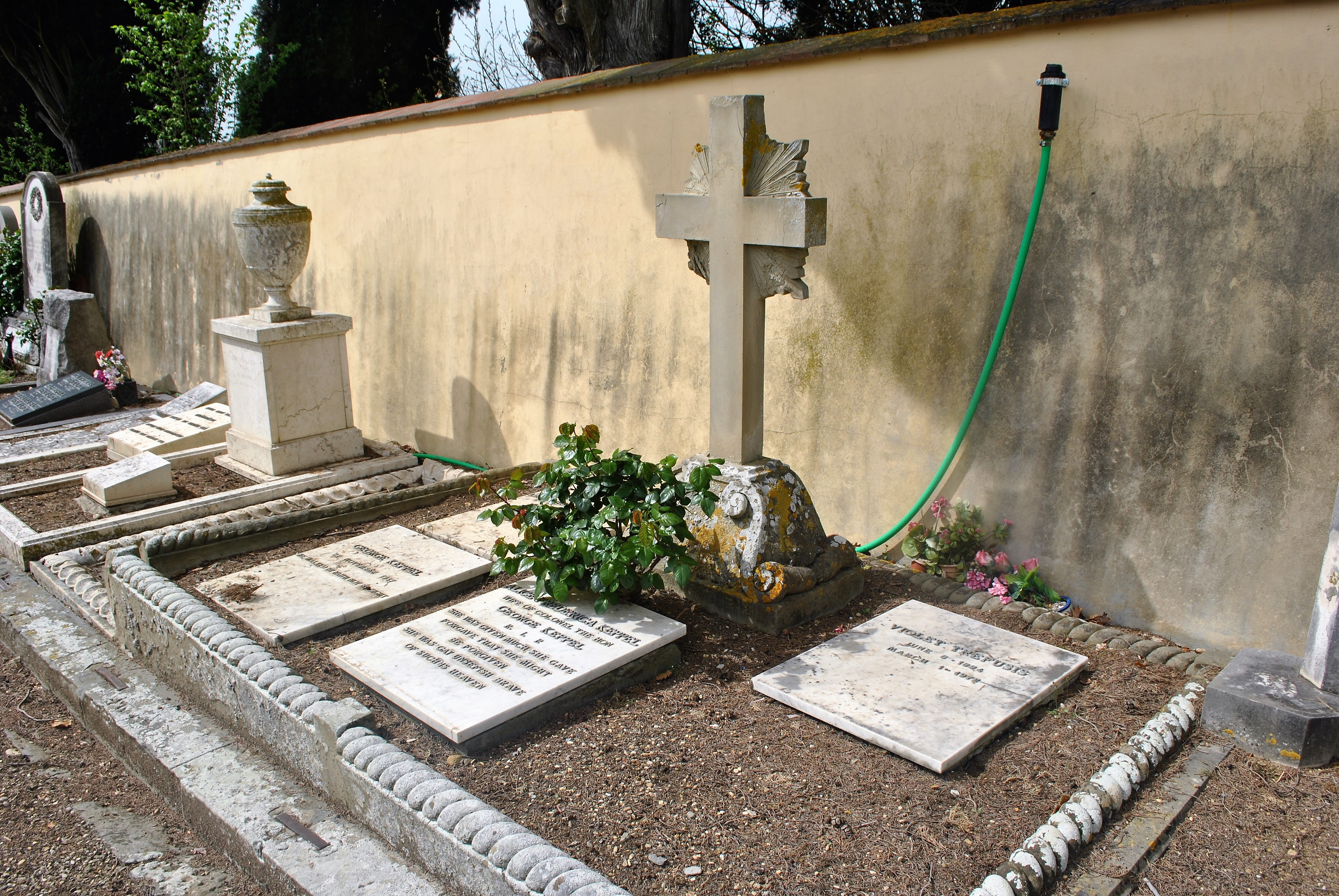
Grave of Violet Trefusis and her parents, George and Alice Keppel, in the Cimitero degli Allori, Florence

Trefusis died at L'Ombrellino on the Bellosguardo on 29 February 1972. She died of starvation, the effect of a malabsorption disease. Her ashes were placed both in Florence at the Cimitero degli Allori (The Evangelical Cemetery of Laurels), alongside the remains of her parents; and in Saint-Loup-de-Naud in the monks' refectory near her tower.

In the 1990 BBC mini-series Portrait of a Marriage, Violet Trefusis is portrayed by Cathryn Harrison.

== Writings ==
Novels

- Sortie de secours (1929)
- Écho (1931)
- Tandem (1933)
- Broderie Anglaise (1935)
- Hunt the Slipper (1937)
- Les causes perdues (1940)
- Pirates at play (1950)

Memoirs

- Prelude to Misadventure (1941)
- Don't look Round (1952)

Last works

- Memoirs of an armchair (1960)
- From Dusk to Dawn (last work, 1972)

Unpublished / other

- The Hook in the Heart (n.d.)
- Instants de mémoire (Gestes)
- La chèvre et le chou (n.d.)
- The Shortcut
- Les sœurs ennemies (c. 1940s?)
- The End Justifies the Means (c. 1947)
- All Glorious Within (n.d.)
- Alas, A Lady! (n.d.)
- Father and Daughter. The Seducer
- Irène et Pénélope
- The Sleeper (n.d.)
- A Tooth for a Tooth (n.d.)
