= Portrait of a Marriage (TV series) =

1990 British period drama series

- Genre: Period drama
- Based on: Portrait of a Marriage by Nigel Nicolson
- Written by: Penelope Mortimer
- Directed by: Stephen Whittaker
- Starring: Janet McTeer; Cathryn Harrison; David Haig
- Composer: Barrington Pheloung
- Country of origin: United Kingdom
- Original language: English
- No. of episodes: 4

Production
- Producer: Colin Tucker
- Cinematography: David Feig
- Editor: Dick Allen
- Running time: 60 minutes
- Production companies: BBC; WGBH Boston

Original release
- Network: BBC Two
- Release: 19 September – 10 October 1990

Portrait of a Marriage is a British television miniseries detailing the real-life love affair between Vita Sackville-West and Violet Keppel, as well as the strength of Vita's enduring marriage to the diplomat Harold Nicolson. Based on the biography of the same name by Nigel Nicolson, it features Janet McTeer as Vita, and Cathryn Harrison as Violet.

The series was adapted by Penelope Mortimer, directed by Stephen Whittaker and produced by Colin Tucker. It was first aired on BBC Two in four parts in 1990; a three-part edited version aired in the United States on PBS in 1992 as part of the Masterpiece Theatre strand.

== Cast ==
- Janet McTeer as Vita Sackville-West
- Cathryn Harrison as Violet Trefusis
- David Haig as Harold Nicolson
- Diana Fairfax as Lady Sackville
- Peter Birch as Denys Trefusis
- Kathleen Byron as Lady Carnock

== Production ==
Nigel Nicolson, son of Vita and Harold, originally sold the rights to his book to Patricia Hodge, who offered it to the BBC. Matt Wolf, writing in The New York Times, described Nicolson as being "among the severest critics" of the production. Nicolson said that "there was too much sex in it" and if someone were to respond that he wrote it: "But my answer is there's a difference between written words and the visual image. The affair could have been suggested much more delicately; it could be done by gesture and look, not necessarily by performance."

Whittaker and McTeer also spoke to Wolf. Whittaker found the story "quite remarkable" and said of the subjects: "They were trying actually to make some sense of their lives, to come to terms and explore themselves in very painful and joyous ways and to be at one with themselves." McTeer said that: "[Vita] didn't quite fit in anywhere. She wasn't quite in the Bloomsbury set; she wasn't quite a bohemian; she didn't quite belong in the aristocracy. She was an eccentric, and eccentric people are always interesting."

== Reception ==
John J. O'Connor, writing for The New York Times, praised the performances of McTeer, Harrison and Haig, and said: "Despite offering much to admire, Portrait of a Marriage eventually wears painfully thin." In the Los Angeles Times, Howard Rosenberg also praised the performances, describing them as "first rate", but said that "Penelope Mortimer's adaptation is without joy, giving us no one to like or even care about". Tony Scott in Variety concluded his review by praising the production of the drama, including costume, design, filming, editing and music, and saying: "Visually and dramatically Marriage is terrif". All three reviewers discussed the cuts made for the American audience.

The production won three awards at the British Academy Television Awards in 1991 in the costume design (Dinah Collin), design (Stuart Walker) and film editor (Dick Allen) categories; Lisa Westcott was nominated in the make up category. The series also won the Grand Prize at the 1991 Banff Television Festival.
