= Flickers (TV series) =

Television series

- Series title card.
- Genre: Comedy drama
- Written by: Roy Clarke
- Directed by: Cyril Coke
- Starring: Bob Hoskins; Frances de la Tour
- Composer: Ron Grainer
- Country of origin: United Kingdom
- Original language: English
- No. of series: 1
- No. of episodes: 6

Production
- Producers: Joan Brown; David Reid
- Running time: 50 minutes
- Production company: Associated Television

Original release
- Network: ITV
- Release: 17 September – 22 October 1980

Flickers is a British television series written by Roy Clarke. Six episodes were produced by ATV, which were originally broadcast on ITV in 1980. A comedy drama, it stars Bob Hoskins as a pioneering filmmaker and Frances de la Tour as the wealthy, middle-class woman who backs his ambitions.

== Cast ==
- Bob Hoskins as Arnie Cole
- Frances de la Tour as Maud
- Fraser Cains as Llewellyn
- Philip Madoc as Jack Brewer
- Sheila Reid as Lily Brewer
- Dickie Arnold as Corky Brown
- Valerie Holliman as Cora Brown
- Granville Saxton as Max Legendre
- Jim Hooper as Percy Bowden
- Joanna Foster as Clara Brewer
- Teresa Codling as Dotty Brewer
- Tom Cotcher as Hector
- Sheri Shepstone as Violet
- Peggy Ann Wood as Nanny
- Sherrie Hewson as Letty
- Patrick Gordon as Gilbert Winslow
- Maxine Audley as Gwendoline Harper
- Andy de la Tour as Clive

== Episodes ==
No.	Title	Original release date
1	"Episode 1"	17 September 1980
In 1910, Arnie Cole is struggling to make ends meet whilst operating a travelling fleapit cinema business. Realising there is more money to be made into the burgeoning film industry, he sets up his own film company. Things go off to a inauspicious start when his part time squeeze Letty is arrested when they try to illegally film a horse race. Desperate for money, he gets an intriguing offer from Lady Maud, who has her own reasons for seeking a partnership, that latterly become apparent.
2	"Episode 2"	24 September 1980
Arnie and Maud arrange to get married at the local registry office. However the wedding day comes off to an awkward start when Arnie and Lllwelyn arrived tired and dishevelled. Maud subsequently returns home, whilst Arnie decides to track down actors and crew to make his first picture. Among them is Corky Brown, an alcoholic comedian; his agent Max Legendre, an ambitious but pretentious director; and the Brewer family who rely on their youngest daughter Dotty, who has become a child star. However, the contract negotiations for Arnie prove protracted and fraught.
3	"Episode 3"	1 October 1980
Work begins on Arnie's first picture, however Corky's alcoholism becomes increasingly problematic and Max has frequent clashes with the crew, leading to conflict on set. In order to raise much needed capital, Arnie suggests to Maud about selling her house, to which she strongly objects. Meanwhile, Clara Brewer is determined to break away from her family and establish a career as a film actress, even if it means posing for nude photographs.
4	"Episode 4"	8 October 1980
Several months have passed and Maud has given birth to her child. Max is tiring of producing comedy shorts and encourages Arnie to commission a six-reel costume picture - a romantic adventure story about a highwayman, in order to cash in on the growing demand for longer films. Production proves fraught and runs over budget due to Max's demands for historical accuracy, these are further exacerbated when he casts theatrical actress Gwendoline Harper for a leading role, but she proves to be difficult and tempremental to deal with. Needing money to keep his business afloat, Arnie approaches Letty and persuades her to work for him.
5	"Episode 5"	15 October 1980
Maud and Llwelywn are unhappy with Letty's presence at the film studio, while Arnie promises her a part in his new picture, yet she mistakenly has other ideas about his intentions. He has enough trouble with his over-demanding actress Gwendoline Harper, whom insists that her leading man Gilbert Winslow should spend more time with her outside of work, however Gilbert is less than keen about the prospect. Arnie decides to organise a party, in order to impress the bank manager Mr. Crane in the hope that he'll receive a loan; however, things don't go according to plan.
6	"Episode 6"	22 October 1980
After the disastrous party, Arnie angrily takes it out his actors individually. Struggling to raise capital on his vastly over-budgeted costume film, he decides to drown his sorrows, yet Maud is isn't ready to give in and later surprises Arnie when she informs him that Mr. Crane has decided to give them the loan after admitting he found the party enjoyable. Meanwhile, Letty is heartbroken when she discovers what Arnie had in mind for her. Just as things start to pick at the film studio, a disaster occurs that looks set to turn all their dreams into ashes.

== Background and production ==
Set in the early days of the British film industry, Flickers was inspired by writer Roy Clarke reading the autobiography of Cecil B. DeMille, one of the founding fathers of American cinema. Clarke noted in 1980, "I was staggered that nobody had thought of a series about the old timers of the movie world, apart from the documentary subjects. It seemed to me that there was much more excitement in what went on behind the scenes, than in front." During preproduction, Clarke and his producer Joan Brown undertook a great level of research on the British film industry in order to get the background and historical accuracy right, including period costumes, vehicles and props; film historian John Huntley was employed as technical advisor and supplied an original film camera dating from the early 1910s. Although the show was described as a light drama in ATV's publicity for the series, Clarke pointed out that it maintained a lot of humour, despite being more dramatic than his earlier works.

In 1982, the series received an Emmy nomination for Outstanding Limited Series.

== Reception ==
Some critics compared the series negatively with Pennies from Heaven which had also starred Hoskins, whilst others were more favourable: John J. O'Connor from The New York Times described it as "one of the daffiest and most hilarious original screenplays written for television. As Arnie and Maud stagger through their unusual relationship, 'Flickers' provides representative samplings of types involved in the motion picture business, from short and alcoholic comedian stars to corrupt lawyers, from aging child stars to lazy cameramen." Meanwhile, Jennifer Lovelace from The Stage wrote, "Flickers is well researched. Enhanced by splendid automobiles, decorative costumes and authentic design work, it has a strong sense of cinematic history that would carry it through without the occasional attempts to reproduce the frenetic aura of the silent movie that are a fraction contrived."

== Home media ==
The DVD released by Network Distributing in 2010.

The complete series was released by Network Distributing on 7 June 2010.

== Bibliography ==
- Moline, Karen (1988). Bob Hoskins: An Unlikely Hero. London: Sidgwick & Jackson. ISBN 978-0-28-399508-8.
