= Cathryn Harrison =

English actress (1959–2018)

- Harrison aged 16 in Black Moon (1975)
- Born: Cathryn Mary Lee Harrison; 25 May 1959; London, England
- Died: October 2018 (aged 59); Plymouth, Devon, England
- Years active: 1972–2015
- Spouse: Paul Laing (m. 1996)
- Father: Noel Harrison
- Relatives: Rex Harrison (paternal grandfather)

Cathryn Mary Lee Harrison (25 May 1959 – October 2018) was an English actress.

== Early life ==
Harrison was the daughter of the actor and singer Noel Harrison, and Sara Lee Eberts, and the granddaughter of actor Sir Rex Harrison.

== Career ==
In 1972, Harrison began her career aged 13, in Robert Altman's film Images (1972). At aged 16, she performed the role of Lily in Louis Malle's experimental fantasy horror film Black Moon (1975). She played Violet Trefusis, Vita Sackville West's lesbian lover in Portrait of a Marriage (1990).

She worked in British television and radio dramas, appearing in Love on a Branch Line (1994). She appeared opposite Robert Powell in an episode of Hannay (1989),; and a 1977 Australian film called Blue Fire Lady (1977). She also appeared as Major Tom Cadman's wife in the ITV series Soldier Soldier (1991), she played assistant stage manager Irene in the Ronald Harwood written film The Dresser (1983).

== Death ==
Cathryn Harrison died in October 2018.

== Films and television ==
- Images (1972) - Susannah
- The Pied Piper (1972) - Lisa
- Black Moon (1975) - Lily
- Romance (1977, TV Series) - Vere
- Blue Fire Lady (1977) - Jenny
- The Witches of Pendle (1977, TV Movie) - Alizon Device
- Moths (1977, TV Movie) - Vere
- Return of the Saint (1978, TV Series) - Sally
- Wuthering Heights (1978, TV Mini-Series) - Catherine Linton
- The Life and Adventures of Nicholas Nickleby (1982, TV Mini-Series) - Tilda Price / Henrietta Petowker
- Maybury (1983, TV Series) - Joanna
- The Dresser (1983) - Irene
- A Christmas Carol (1984, TV Movie) - Kate
- Robin of Sherwood (1986, TV Series) - Isadora
- The Happy Valley (1986, TV Movie) - Helen Tapsell
- Duet for One (1986) - Penny Smallwood
- Empire State (1987) - Marion
- Eat the Rich (1987) - Joanna
- A Handful of Dust (1988) - Milly
- Hannay (1989, TV Series) - Barbara Leigh
- Bergerac (1990, TV Series) - Julie Manton
- Chillers (1990)
- Portrait of a Marriage (1990, TV Mini-Series) - Violet Keppel Trefusis
- Soldier Soldier (1991, TV Series) - Laura Cadman
- Clarissa (1991, TV Series) - Mrs. Sinclair
- Agatha Christie's Poirot (1992) - Lady Horbury
- Desmond's (1993, TV Series) - Fiona
- Love on a Branch Line (1994, TV Mini-Series) - Chloe
- Thin Ice (1994) - Vandy
- Murder in Mind (1994, TV Movie) - Eileen
- The Choir (1995, TV Mini-Series) - Sally Ashworth
- Wycliffe (1995, TV Series) - Jane Hardy
- McCallum (1995, TV Series) - Claire Best
- Original Sin (1997, TV Mini-Series) - Claudia Etienne
- Déjà Vu (1997) - Fern's Masseuse
- Heat of the Sun (1998, TV Mini-Series) - Charlotte Elliott
- The Bill (1999, TV Series) - Ms. Spencer
- Table 12 (2001, TV Series) - Ali
- Shades (2001) - Emily Thompson
- The Three Dumas (2007, Documentary) - Marchioness Davy De La Pailleterie
