= Evoluon =

Building in Eindhoven, the Netherlands

Coordinates: 51°26′37″N 5°26′49″E

Current (left) logo of the conference centre and logo (right) of the original museum.

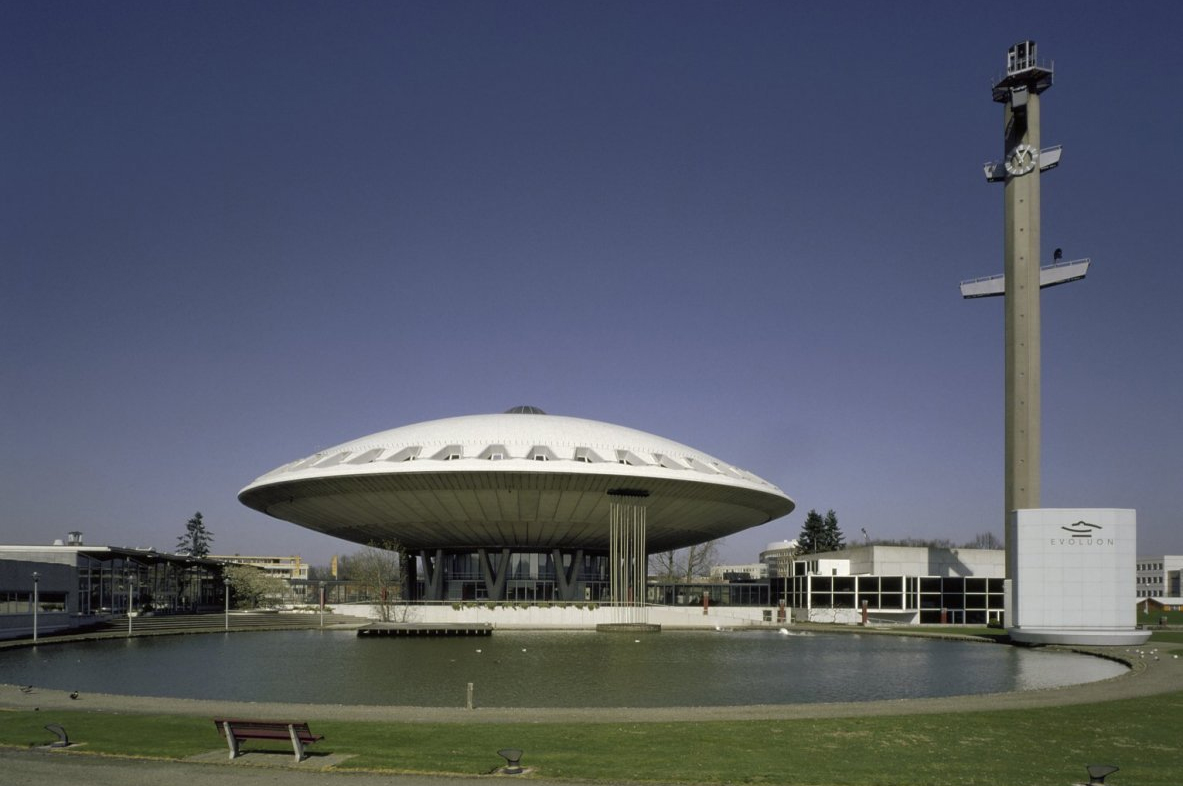
View from the south

The Evoluon is a UFO-shaped building located in Eindhoven, the Netherlands. It was built in 1966 as a science museum by the electronics and electrical company Philips. It quickly became a landmark in Eindhoven, where Philips was headquartered at the time. The museum closed in 1989 and the building became a conference centre and exhibition venue in 1998. In 2022 it reopened for the general public again as the Next Nature Museum.

The building is unique due to its very futuristic design, resembling a landed flying saucer. It was designed by architects Leo de Bever and Louis Christiaan Kalff, while the exhibition it housed was conceived by James Gardner. De Bever and Kalff only got two demands for the design of the building, it had to be "spectacular" and it had to be possible to hold exhibitions in the building.

Its concrete dome is 77 metres (253 ft) in diameter and is held in place by 169 kilometres (105 mi) of reinforcing steel bars.

In the 1960s and 1970s the Evoluon attracted large numbers of visitors due to its innovative interactive exhibitions. When competing science museums opened in other cities, the number of visitors declined and the original museum closed down in 1989. The building was converted into a conference centre which opened in 1998.

In the UK the Evoluon is chiefly remembered from Bert Haanstra's wordless short film entitled simply Evoluon, commissioned by Philips to publicise the museum, and shown as a trade test colour film on BBC television from 1968 to 1972.

In October 2013 the Evoluon was used to stage four 3D-concerts by the German electronic band Kraftwerk, each before an audience of 1,200 spectators. Key band member Ralf Hütter handpicked the venue for its retro-futuristic look. Bespoke 3D-visuals of the saucer section of the building descending from space were used in the live rendition of their track Spacelab.

On September 24, 2022, the Evoluon reopened to the public with the RetroFuture exhibition.

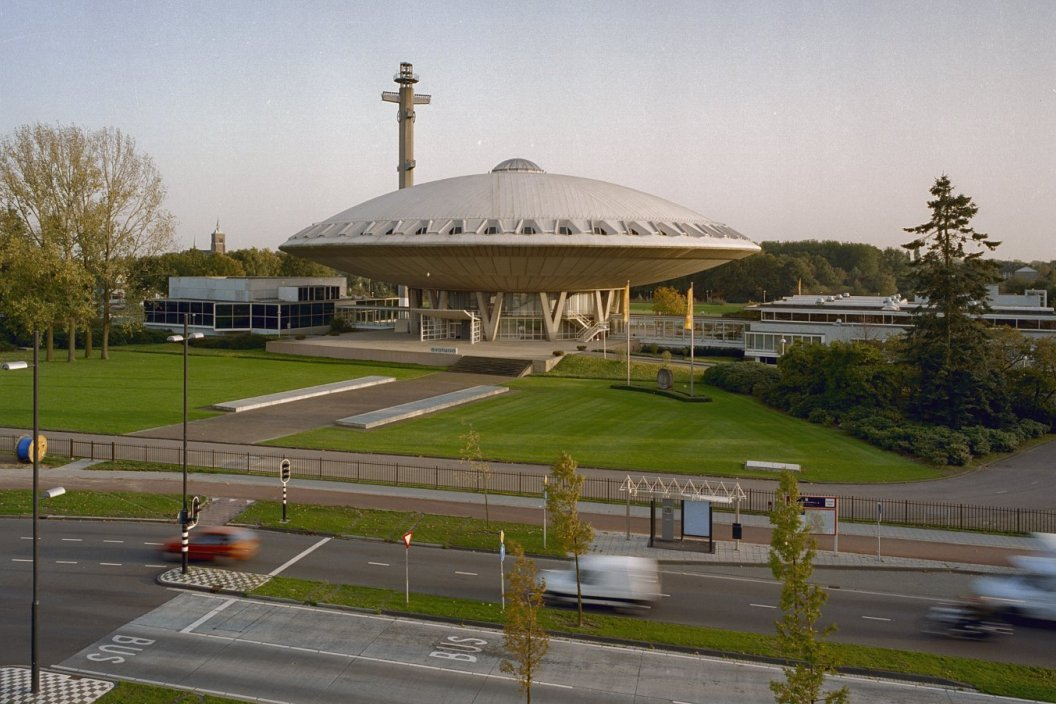
View from the north

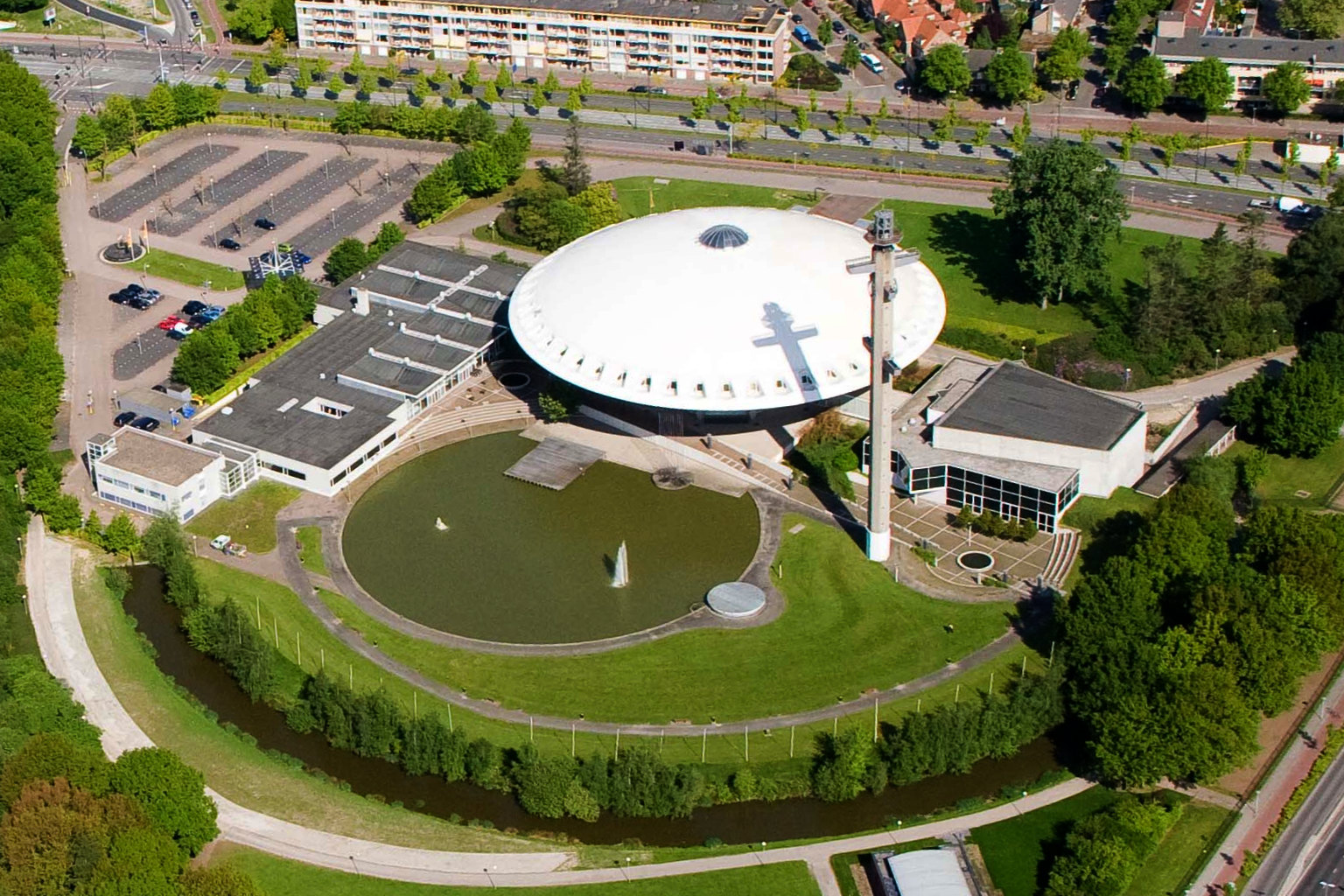
Aerial view in 2009

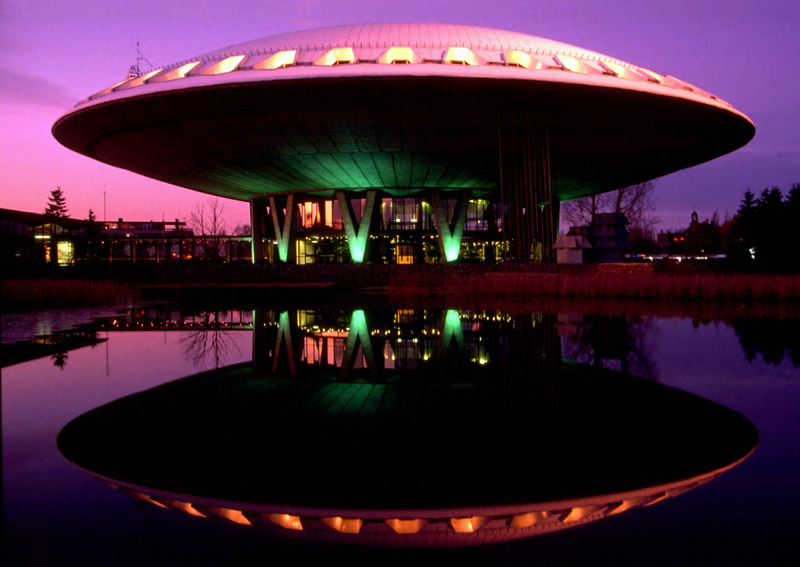
Night view in 1991

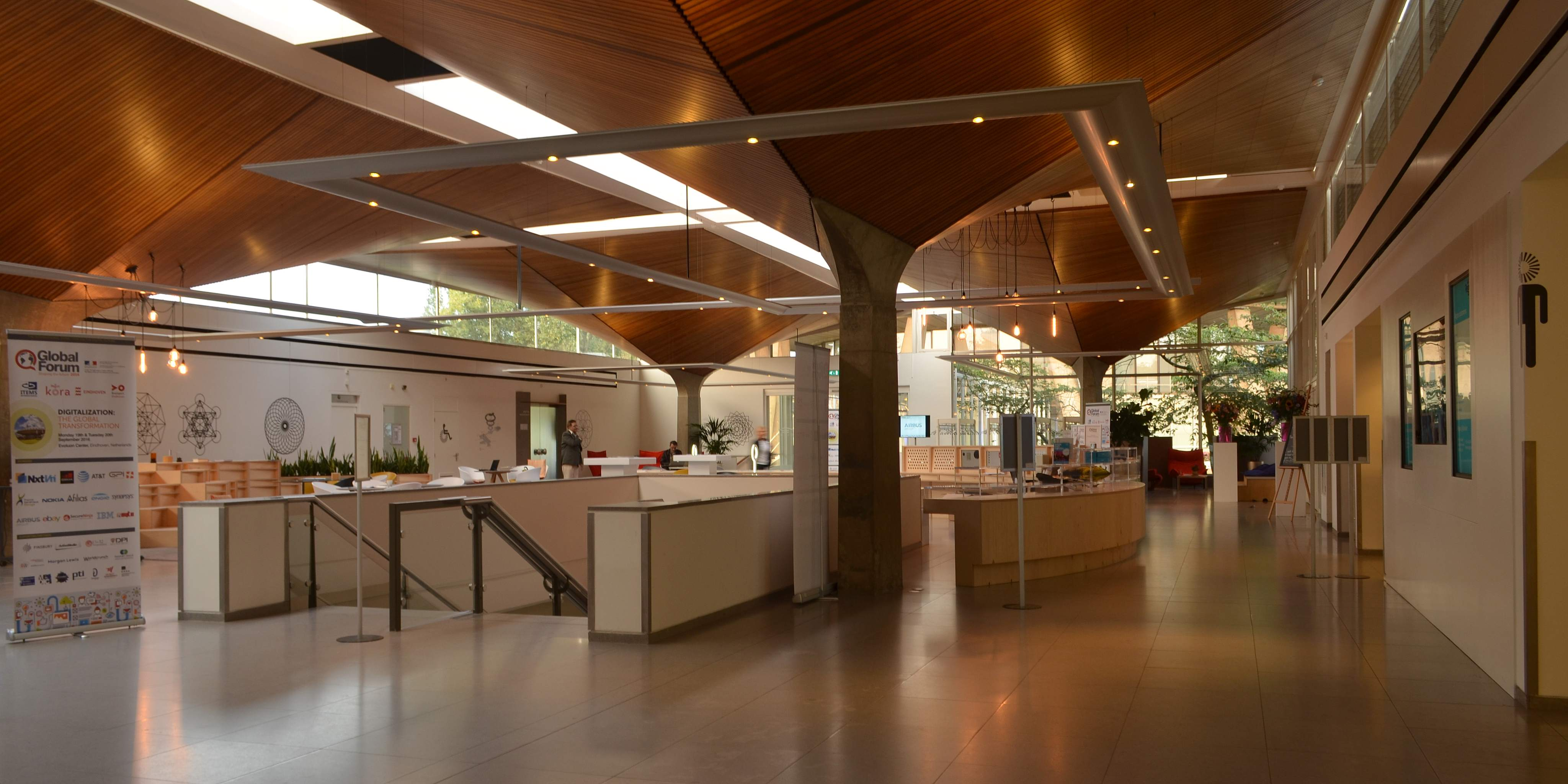
Entrance lobby

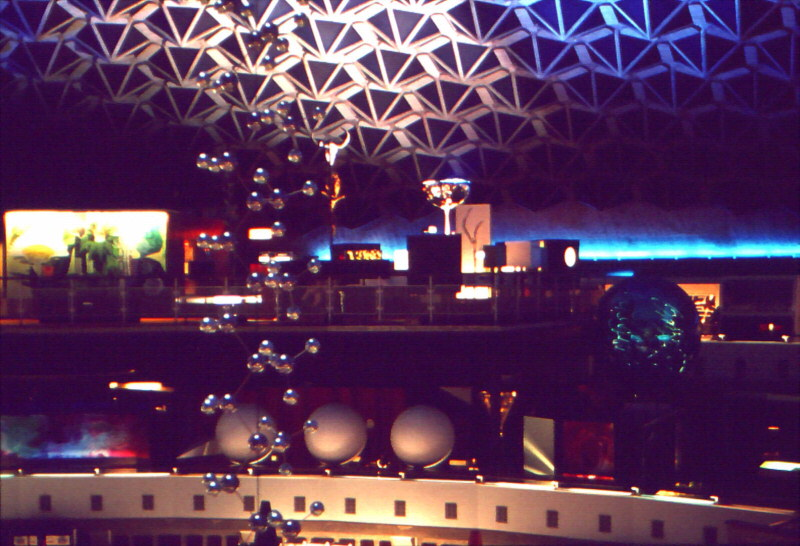
Interior in 1968

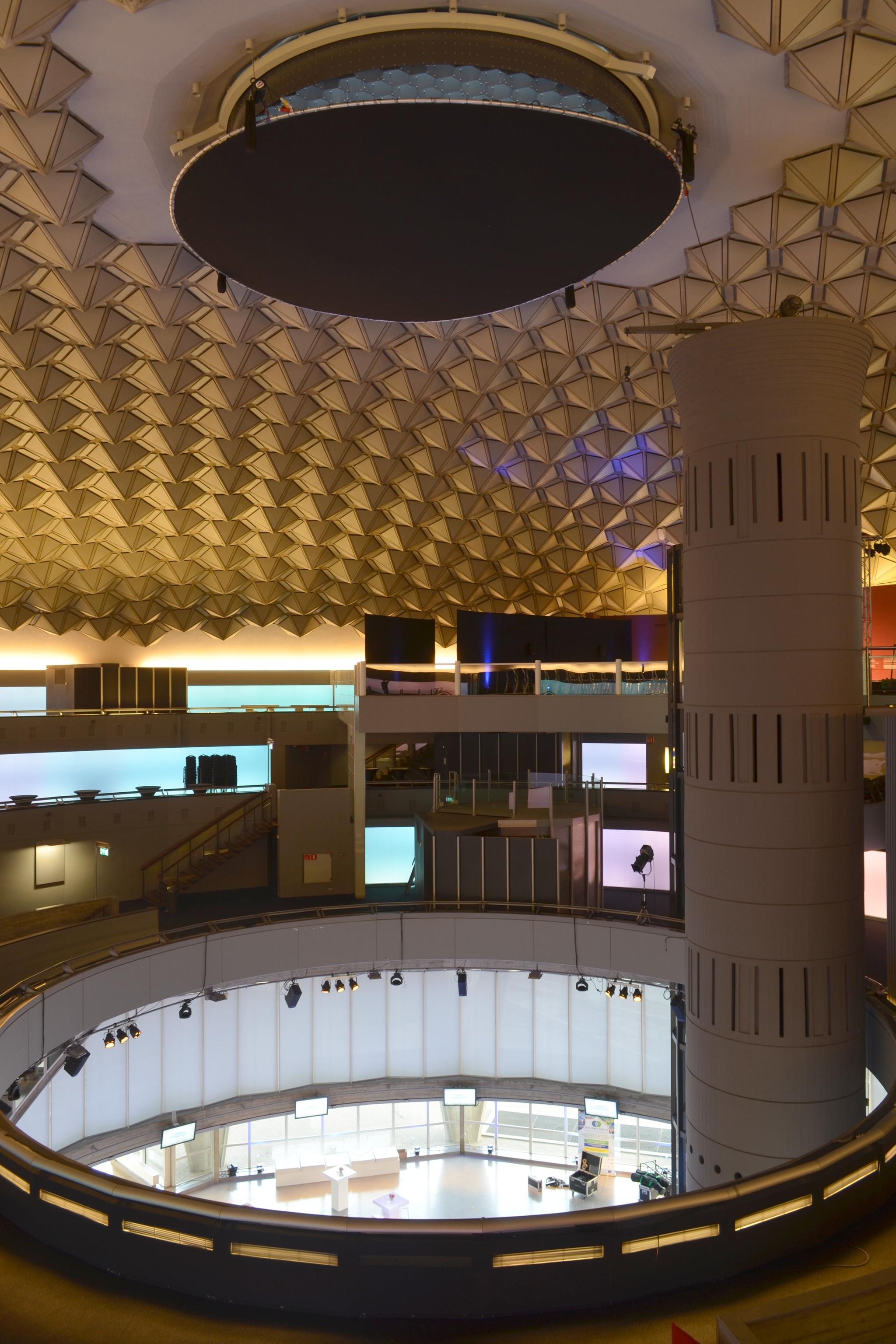
Interior in 2016
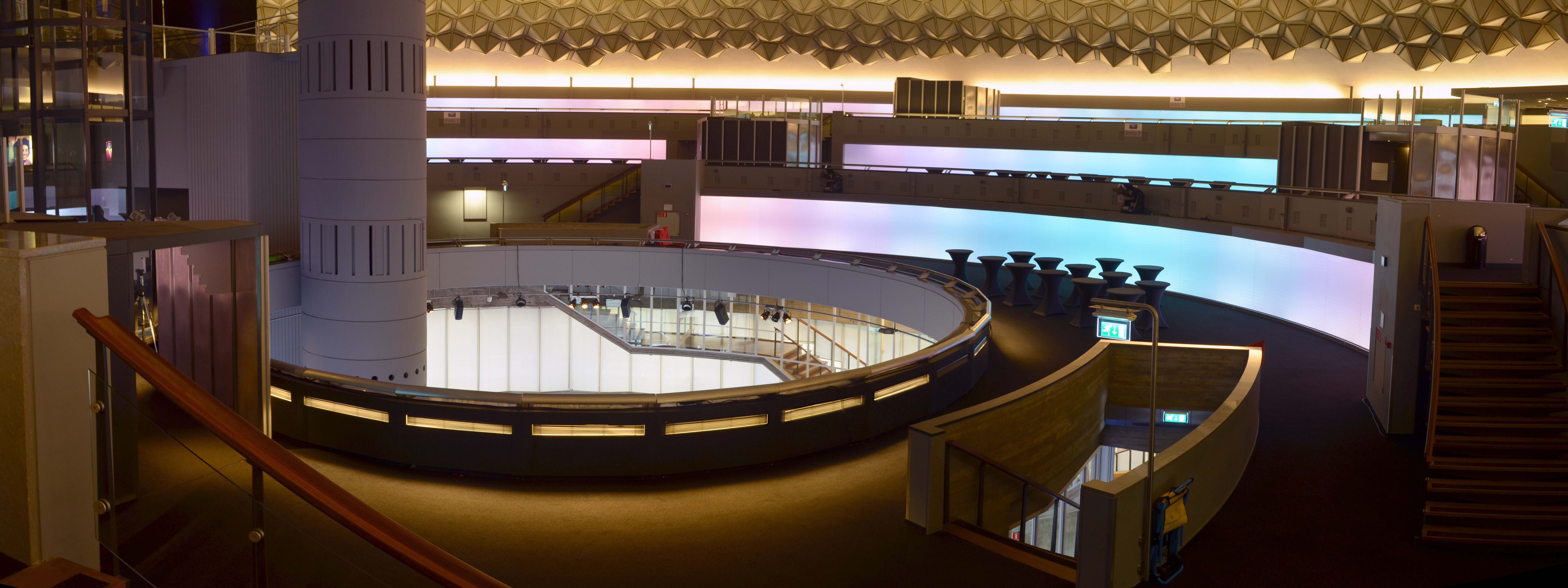
Stitched panorama of its interior

== See also ==
- List of convention centres in the Netherlands
