= Portrait of a Marriage =

Book by Nigel Nicolson

- First edition
- Author: Nigel Nicolson
- Subject: Vita Sackville-West
- Genre: Biography
- Publisher: Weidenfeld & Nicolson
- Publication date: 1973

Portrait of a Marriage: Vita Sackville-West and Harold Nicolson is the 1973 biography of writer and gardener Vita Sackville-West compiled by her son Nigel Nicolson from her journals and letters.

== Synopsis ==
The book relates to Sackville-West's complicated marriage to writer and politician Harold Nicolson. Two chapters are written by Sackville-West. They are centred on herself and her passion for Violet Trefusis for whom she abandoned Harold Nicolson, Vita's bisexual husband and her two children, Nigel and Ben.

Three chapters were written by her son Nigel Nicolson. They present the sexual and emotional life secrets of his mother: "I did not know Violet. I met her only twice, and by then she had become a galleon, no longer the pinnace of her youth, and I did not recognize in her sails the high wind which had swept my mother away […]. I did not know that Vita could love like this, had loved like this, because she would not speak of it to her son. Now that I know everything I love her more, as my father did, because she was tempted, because she was weak. She was a rebel, she was Julian [Vita’s alter ego], and though she did not know it, she fought for more than Violet. She fought for the right to love, men and women, rejecting the conventions that marriage demands exclusive love, and that women should love only men, and men only women. For this she was prepared to give up everything. Yes, she may have been mad, as she later said, but it was a magnificent folly. She may have been cruel, but it was a cruelty on a heroic scale. How can I despise the violence of such passion?"

Sackville-West writes mostly about herself and her emotions. Nicolson writes about his father and the love between him and Vita, that grew more and more important for them as their life progressed, and was the base to which each of them returned after Vita's strong passions for other people, including Virginia Woolf, and Harold's adventures with men. Nicolson stresses the liberal nature of Vita's and Harold's views and actions about marriage and sexuality in the early years of the 20th century, but also brings forward Vita's intense snobbery and coldness about the lower social classes.

== Film and television adaptations ==
- 1990 mini-series adapted by Penelope Mortimer for the BBC starring Janet McTeer; also broadcast on PBS television in 1991.
