= Caroline Mortimer =

British actress (1942–2020)

Caroline Mortimer (born Caroline Dimont; 12 March 1942 – 20 September 2020) was a British actress.

Caroline Mortimer was the daughter of the novelist Penelope Mortimer from her first marriage to the journalist Charles Dimont and the stepdaughter of the playwright Sir John Mortimer. She was trained at the Royal Academy of Dramatic Art.

== Career ==
Her television credits include: 1965's A Little Temptation, in which she co-starred with Denholm Elliott and Barbara Jefford, 1966's Intrigue, an industrial espionage series in which she played Val, the hero's assistant/girlfriend, The Saint ("The Organisation Man", 1968), Menace, Spy Trap and The Death of Adolf Hitler. In 1974 she played Alice Vavasor in six episodes of The Pallisers. Her other television work includes Within These Walls, Rumpole of the Bailey ("Rumpole and the Bubble Reputation", 1988), Looking For Clancy, Marked Personal, Space: 1999, The Cleopatras (1983) and an appearance as Emily Murray in one episode of the 1991 BBC television series The House of Eliott.

== Personal life ==
In the 1960s, she had a relationship with the married actor Leslie Phillips. She married the actor John Bennett in 1979. They had two sons, one of whom is deceased. Her husband died in April 2005.

Mortimer died in September 2020 at the age of 78.

== Selected filmography ==
- The Home-Made Car (1963) as Girlfriend
- Saturday Night Out (1964) as Marlene
- A Place for Lovers (1968) as Maggie
- The McKenzie Break (1970) as A.T.S. Sgt. Bell
- The Hireling (1973) as Connie
- Juggernaut (1974) as Susan McLeod
