= Black Moon (1975 film) =

1975 film

- French theatrical release poster
- Directed by: Louis Malle
- Written by: Louis Malle; Joyce Buñuel; Ghislain Uhry
- Produced by: Claude Nejar
- Starring: Cathryn Harrison; Therese Giehse; Joe Dallesandro; Alexandra Stewart
- Cinematography: Sven Nykvist
- Edited by: Suzanne Baron
- Music by: Diego Masson
- Distributed by: 20th Century Fox (United States) Cinema International Corporation (France); Filmverlag der Autoren (West Germany)
- Release dates: 24 September 1975 (France); 30 September 1975 (New York Film Festival)
- Running time: 100 minutes
- Countries: France; West Germany; Sweden
- Languages: English, French

Black Moon is a 1975 Franco-German experimental fantasy horror film directed by Louis Malle and starring Cathryn Harrison, Joe Dallesandro, Therese Giehse and Alexandra Stewart. Though produced in France, its dialogue is in both French and English. It is dedicated to Giehse, who died shortly after shooting had completed.

The film opened in France on 24 September 1975 before screening at the 1975 New York Film Festival, with North American distribution overseen by 20th Century Fox.

== Plot ==
Lily is attempting to seek refuge amidst an apparent gender-based civil war in which men and women are systematically killing one another. On a rural road, she encounters men executing women by firing squad, and flees with her car into the woods, following an overgrown road. There, she encounters a flock of sheep gathered around their shepherd, who has hanged himself from a tree. She later comes across a group of women donning military gear and torturing a young man. She abandons her car, fleeing on foot, and falls asleep in a meadow, where she hears the flowers beneath her crying in pain. Moments later, she witnesses a brown unicorn pass by, followed by a woman on a horse, and a number of naked children who begin herding a pig.

Lily trails the rider to an apparently abandoned château located beyond overgrowth on a hill. While exploring the house, she finds it fully furnished, but inhabited by numerous animals. Upstairs, she finds an elderly bedridden woman chastising her pet rat, Humphrey. The woman proceeds to attack Lily before contacting an unknown person on a transistor radio, making cruel observations of Lily's appearance and revealing details of how Lily arrived there that she should have no way of knowing. A number of alarm clocks inexplicably go off, and the old woman tries to strangle Lily. When Lily slaps her, the woman dies.

Outside, Lily's attention is diverted by a man singing in the garden. Via telepathy, he communicates to her that his name is also Lily. His sister, also named Lily, whom Lily had previously mistaken for a man, arrives on horseback. Lily attempts to explain to Brother and Sister Lily that their mother is dead, but they ignore her. When she follows them upstairs, she witnesses the old woman return to life before Sister Lily breastfeeds her.

Brother and Sister lock Lily in the room with the old woman, sending Lily into a rage. While exploring the room, she eats a piece of cheese and looks through a photo album containing pictures of the old woman, whilst the old woman continues to make observations about her to the unknown person on the radio. To the old woman's anger, Lily looks out the window and again sees the unicorn. Lily climbs out the window and down the wall, and chases the unicorn around the sprawling property as it continuously eludes her. She is horrified when she stumbles upon the corpse of a female soldier. Brother picks the corpse up and buries it in a grave. The unicorn appears again, and Lily chases it until she trips over the pig and is set upon by the band of naked children. The unicorn once again appears to Lily, and tells her she is mean. The unicorn also tells Lily the old woman upstairs is not real.

In the house, Lily observes Sister serving the children dinner. Upstairs, Lily tries to comfort the old woman after another fight with Humphrey, and agrees to breastfeed her. Later, Lily plays Tristan und Isolde on the parlor piano. The children sing along, while Sister paints Brother's face and the two reenact the opera. At dawn, Lily finds the old woman has disappeared. An eagle flies into the house, which Brother decapitates with a sword. Brother and Sister then battle one another in the garden as Lily watches from the window. Brother beats Sister with a stick, and Sister bashes him in the face with a rock as sounds of gunfire emanate from the woods. Lily climbs into the old woman's empty bed and tries unsuccessfully to use the radio, after which a snake slithers onto the bed. Outside, a large crowd of sheep and turkeys surround the house. After falling asleep, Lily awakens to find the unicorn seated in front of the fireplace. Lily prepares to breastfeed the unicorn.

== Cast ==
- Cathryn Harrison as Lily
- Therese Giehse as Old Lady(as Thérèse Giehse)
- Alexandra Stewart as Sister Lily
- Joe Dallesandro as Brother Lily

== Production ==
Malle has characterized his film as "[o]paque, sometimes clumsy, it is the most intimate of my films. I see it as a strange voyage to the limits of the medium, or maybe my own limits."

Black Moon was shot in Malle's own 200-year-old manor house and its surrounding 225-acre (0.91 km^{2}) estate in the lush, wild Dordogne valley in Quercy, near Cahors, called "Le Coual," or "The Crow's Call." The house and grounds were actually the initial inspiration for the film, according to Malle in an interview in Cinefantastique (Volume 5, Number 1): "It began with the fact that I wanted to shoot the film in my own house. Black Moon certainly comes very much from the place where I live, the kind of countryside around the house. There's something very ancient, maybe archaic, about it, also something...hostile." Malle also said that the film was influenced by his admiration for Lewis Carroll's Alice in Wonderland.

Malle hired Sven Nykvist, Ingmar Bergman's cinematographer, to shoot the film, and wanted there to be no scenes in which there was direct sunlight. They shot indoor scenes on sunny days until the light was right for the exterior shots.

Thinking that the film would be difficult for audiences to sit through as a full-length feature, Malle considered releasing it in a shorter version, and prepared a one-hour cut, removing scenes that he felt did not work.

== Release ==
=== Home media ===
A digitally restored version of the film was released by The Criterion Collection in June 2011.

=== Critical response ===
Vincent Canby of The New York Times praised the film's cinematography, performances, and imagery, calling the film "baffling and beautiful and occasionally very funny." Time Out wrote, "Malle offers no explanation for his heroine's visionary odyssey through a world in which all history runs parallel with all realities. Yet a logic is there, even if its reference point is jabberwocky." Dennis Schwartz from Ozus' World Movie Reviews awarded the film an A− rating, praising the film's cinematography and themes, calling it "an hysterical but absorbing Alice-in-Wonderland surrealist fantasy film." TV Guide gave the film a positive review, calling it "'[a] haunting, disturbing picture that is half-fantasy, half-reality, but we are never certain which is which." Joseph Jon Lanthier of Slant Magazine rated the film three out of five stars, concluding, "Suckling as it does from the budding teat of preadolescent sexuality, it’s not surprising that Black Moon is a tad Malle-nourished."

=== Awards and nominations ===
Black Moon won French César Awards for Best Sound and Best Cinematography.

== Sources ==
- Lentz, Harris (2001). Science Fiction, Horror & Fantasy Film and Television Credits: Filmography (2nd ed.). Jefferson, North Carolina: McFarland. ISBN 978-0-786-40951-8.
