= Leo de Bever =

Dutch architect

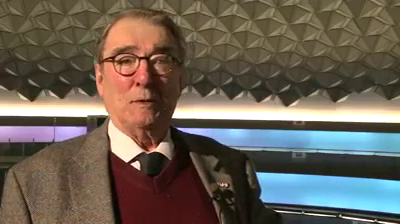
Leo de Bever in 2013

Leonardus Lodewijk Josephus "Leo" de Bever (14 July 1930 – 14 August 2015) was a Dutch architect best known for his works in the city of Eindhoven, which included the Evoluon which he created together with Louis Kalff, the Catharina Ziekenhuis and Eindhoven Airport.

== Career ==
De Bever was born in Eindhoven raised in a family of architects, with both his father and grandfather being architects. His son Stefan would also become an architect. De Bever studied at the Academie van Bouwkunst van de Leergangen in Tilburg, he later obtained a Master of Architecture from Cornell University, United States. He started his out his career in New York, Milan and Rome, but later kept mostly to Eindhoven. In 1965 de Bever took over his father's architect firm together with his brother Loed de Bever. For the design of the Evoluon de Bever and Louis Kalff only got two demands, it had to be "spectacular" and it had to be possible to hold exhibitions in the building.

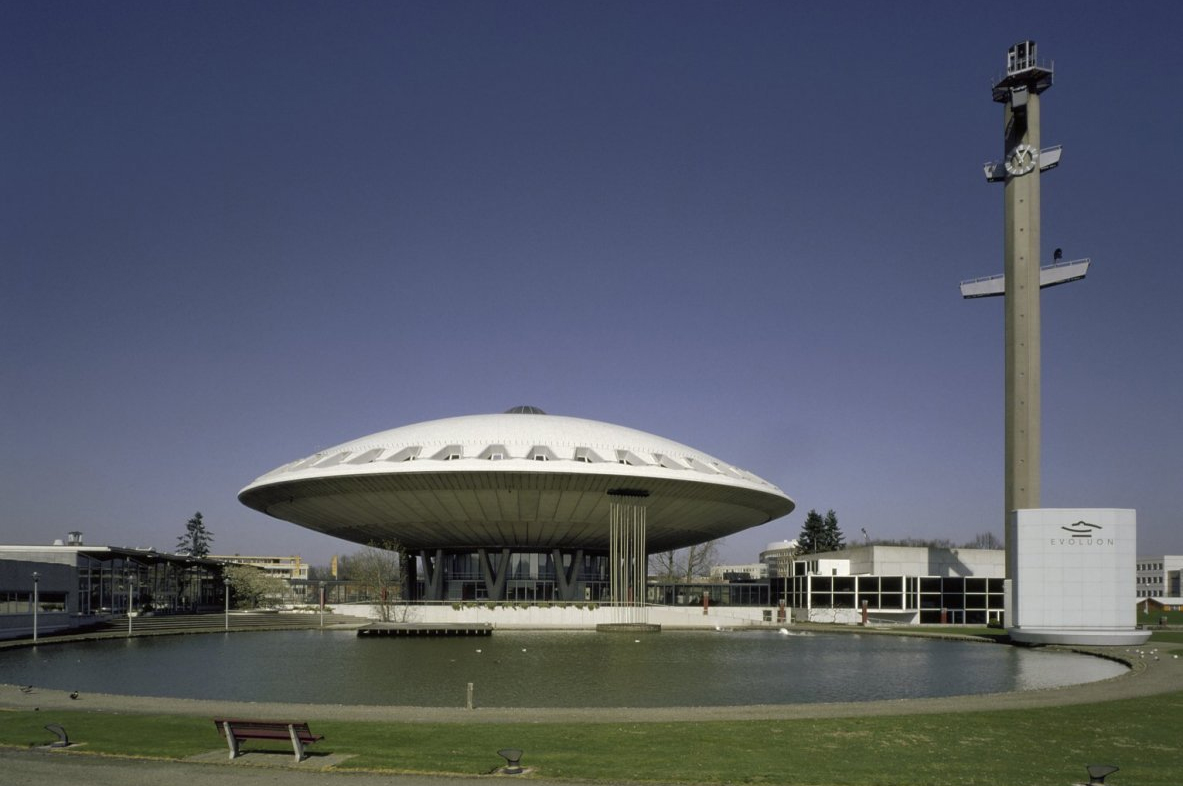
Evoluon

In 2011 de Bever was invested as a Knight of the Order of Orange-Nassau, amongst others for his volunteer work concerning holiday camps for the handicapped.

He died on 14 August 2015, aged 85.
