= Penelope Mortimer =

Welsh-born English writer (1918–1999)

- Born: Penelope Ruth Fletcher; 19 September 1918; Rhyl, Flintshire, Wales
- Died: 19 October 1999 (aged 81); Kensington, England
- Occupation: Journalist
- Spouses: Charles Dimont (m. 1937; div. 1949) John Mortimer (m. 1949; div. 1971)
- Children: 6, including Caroline and Jeremy

Penelope Ruth Mortimer (née Fletcher; 19 September 1918 – 19 October 1999) was a Welsh-born English journalist, biographer, and novelist. Her semi-autobiographical novel The Pumpkin Eater (1962) was made into a 1964 film of the same name.

== Personal life ==
Mortimer was born Penelope Ruth Fletcher in Rhyl, Flintshire (now Denbighshire), Wales, the younger daughter of Amy Caroline Fletcher and the Rev A. F. G. Fletcher, an Anglican clergyman. Her father had lost his faith and used the parish magazine to celebrate Soviet persecution of the Russian Orthodox Church. He abused her sexually.

Mortimer later wrote of her father, "I think he was a clergyman for one reason only; there was nothing else – as Nellie Fletcher's second son – he could possibly have been! As a small boy, bullied and teased by six sisters and four brothers, he sat under the nursery table chanting 'Mama, papa, all the children are disagreeable except me', to the tune of Gentle Jesus'."

Her father frequently changed his parish and she attended numerous schools. She was educated at Croydon High School, the New School, Streatham, Blencathra, Rhyl Garden School, Lane End, St Elphin's School for Daughters of the Clergy, and the Central Educational Bureau for Women. She left University College, London after one year.

Penelope married Charles Dimont, a journalist, in 1937. They had two daughters, one of whom was the actress Caroline Mortimer. She also had two daughters through extra-marital relationships with Kenneth Harrison and Randall Swingler. She met the barrister and writer John Mortimer while pregnant with the last child and married him on 27 August 1949, the day that her divorce from Dimont became absolute. Together they had a daughter and a son, Jeremy Mortimer. Their relationship was said to have been happy at first, but soon grew stormy, and from the mid-1950s onward John had a series of extramarital affairs.

In the 1950s and 1960s the Mortimers were frequently photographed at London high-society events. Penelope had frequent bouts of depression. In 1962, the same year The Pumpkin Eater was written, she became pregnant for the eighth time. At the age of 42 and already the mother of six, she agreed at the urging of her husband to have an abortion and undergo sterilisation. She is said to have been happy with the decision, but during her convalescence, she discovered her husband's affair with Wendy Craig, with whom he had a son. The Mortimers divorced in 1971.

== Writings ==
Mortimer wrote more than a dozen novels during her career, most of them focusing on upper middle-class life in British society. She wrote one novel, Johanna (1947), under the name Penelope Dimont. As Penelope Mortimer she wrote A Villa in Summer (1954), which received critical acclaim. Subsequent novels included Daddy's Gone A-Hunting (1958) and The Pumpkin Eater (1962), an autobiographical novel which dealt with a troubled marriage. In 1964 it was made into a successful film scripted by Harold Pinter and starring Anne Bancroft.

As well as writing novels, Mortimer worked as a freelance journalist. Her stories appeared regularly in The New Yorker and The Sunday Times. She served as an agony aunt for the Daily Mail under the pseudonym Ann Temple. In the late 1960s, she replaced Penelope Gilliatt as film critic for The Observer. Mortimer also wrote screenplays.

Macmillan commissioned her to write a biography of the Queen Elizabeth The Queen Mother. The book, Queen Elizabeth: A Portrait of the Queen Mother, was rejected by Macmillan but was eventually published by Viking in 1986. Her former agent Giles Gordon, in his obituary of her in The Guardian, called it "the most astute biography of a royal since Lytton Strachey was at work. Penelope had approached her subject as somebody in the public eye, whose career might as well be recorded as if she were a normal human being."

Mortimer wrote two volumes of autobiography. About Time: An Aspect of Autobiography (1979), which covered her life until 1939, won the Whitbread Prize. A second volume called About Time Too: 1940–1978 was published in 1993. A third volume, Closing Time, remains unpublished.

== Death ==
Penelope Mortimer died of cancer in Kensington, London, at the age of 81.

== Bibliography ==
=== Novels ===
- Johanna (1947, as Penelope Dimont)
- A Villa in Summer (1954)
- The Bright Prison (1956)
- Daddy's Gone A-Hunting (1958) - reissue Persephone Books - paperback
- The Pumpkin Eater (1962) - reissue Penguin Modern Classics (2015) - paperback/ebook
- My Friend Says It's Bulletproof (1968) - reissue Virago Modern Classics (1989) - paperback - out of print but available secondhand
- The Home (1971) - reissue British Library Women Writers (2023) - paperback/ebook
- Long Distance (1974)
- The Handyman (1983)

=== Short stories ===
- Saturday Lunch with the Brownings (1960) - reissue Daunt Books (2020) - paperback/ebook
- Humphrey's Mother (1994)

=== Autobiographies ===
- About Time: An Aspect of Autobiography (1979)
- About Time Too: 1940–78 (1993)

=== Biography ===
- Queen Elizabeth: A Portrait of the Queen Mother (1986), revised edition 1995 subtitled An Alternative Portrait of Her Life And Times

=== Travel writing ===
- With Love and Lizards (1957), co-authored with John Mortimer

=== Screenplays ===
- Bunny Lake Is Missing (1965), co-written with John Mortimer
- Portrait of a Marriage (1990), BBC television adaptation of Portrait of a Marriage by Nigel Nicolson

For reissues see publisher and retailer websites.
