= Play It Again (record label) =

Record label of Play it again Sam (Belgium)

- Founded: 1989
- Founder: Geoff Leonard, Gareth Bramley and Pete Walker
- Status: Active
- Country of origin: United Kingdom
- Official website: http://www.johnbarry.org.uk/pia/

Play It Again is a British record label formed in Droitwich, Worcestershire, in November 1989, by Geoff Leonard, Gareth Bramley and Pete Walker. Leonard had had an idea of releasing some of John Barry's music on CD in an effort to publicise a book on the musical career of the composer, which he had compiled with two other staunch Barry fans – Bramley and Walker. He was interested in Barry's early career, but had already established that EMI (Barry's record company in those days) had no plans to re-issue anything. However, they were prepared to discuss licensing out material and this led to Play It Again's first release Beat Girl/Stringbeat.

Beat Girl, was, coincidentally, Barry's first film score dating from 1960, while the studio album, Stringbeat, was a rare, early stereo recording. The CD was released in September 1990. The albums fitted onto one CD after careful digital remastering at Abbey Road Studios. Beat Girl was Barry's introduction to the world of film music scoring. Stringbeat was an easy-listening album which could almost have been a Vic Flick solo album on which he was accompanied by strings and a clavioline. The CD was accompanied by a booklet which combined extensive notes on the composer with rare photographs – a departure which was to become a trademark of the company.

Next up were two CDs featuring music from John Barry's sojourn at Ember Records between 1963 and 1965. The Ember Years – Volume One contained the music from Elizabeth Taylor in London, a 1963 TV special, together with the music from Four in the Morning, which featured an early film outing for Judi Dench in 1965.

The Ember Years – Volume Two contained the jazz album (A Handful of Songs) recorded in 1963 by Annie Ross, plus John Barry's music from Zulu. The former utilised the services of conductor Johnnie Spence and sound engineer Eric Tomlinson, whilst Barry was the record producer.

Play It Again's fourth release was The A To Z of British TV Themes From The 60s & 70s. This 30-track compilation contained the signature tunes from programmes spanning two decades, in particular the themes from some of the popular series made by ITC.

Born Free – The Don Black Songbook remains the only album to date which comprised songs co-written by the lyricist. There are twenty two songs on this album, giving a comprehensive look at Black's career.

Following the success of the first volume of TV themes, Play It Again released three follow-up albums: The A To Z of British TV Themes – Volume Two, The A To Z of British TV Themes – Volume Three, The A To Z of British TV Themes – Volume Four. They also issued The A To Z of British TV Themes – The Ron Grainer Years.

The Ember Years Volume Three was a mix of many genres. It contained snatches of rock from Mike d'Abo's first beat combo, A Band of Angels, another track from Annie Ross, an oddity from former Coronation Street actor Philip Lowrie (Dennis Tanner) and the BBC-banned 'satirical' recording of 'Christine' by Miss X, based allegedly on the Profumo affair. The main body of work is twenty one recordings made by Chad Stuart and Jeremy Clyde, produced by John Barry and Shel Talmy.

The final Play It Again release was John Barry – The Hits & the Misses. It was a double album tracing the early career of Barry at Abbey Road. Featuring his work as musical director for EMI between 1960 and 1964, and some hits. It included fifty tracks and a sixteen-page booklet of extensive notes, an appreciation from Brian Matthew of BBC Radio 2's Sounds of the Sixties, plus many photographs and record sleeve reproductions.

The label has not released any material since 1998.

== Notable artists ==
- John Barry
- Don Black
- Ron Grainer
- Adam Faith
- Annie Ross
- Chad & Jeremy
