= Ron Grainer =

Australian-English composer (1922–1981)

Background information
- Born: Ronald Erle Grainer; 11 August 1922; Atherton, Queensland, Australia
- Died: 21 February 1981 (aged 58) Cuckfield, Sussex, England
- Occupation: Composer

Ronald Erle Grainer (11 August 1922 – 21 February 1981) was an Australian composer who worked for most of his professional career in the United Kingdom. He is mostly remembered for his television and film score music, especially the theme music for Doctor Who, The Prisoner, Steptoe and Son and Tales of the Unexpected.

== Biography ==
=== Early life ===
Ronald Grainer was born on 11 August 1922 in Atherton, Queensland, Australia, the first child of Margaret Clark, an amateur pianist, and Ronald Albert Grainer, a storekeeper and postmaster.

For the first eight years of Ron's life the Grainer family lived in Mount Mulligan, a small town built around the extraction of coal from three seams which lay beneath a 400-metre-high sandstone monolith, located 100 km west of Cairns. Apart from the industrial noise and dust, the family sometimes had to contend with the after effects of a high consumption of alcohol by the shift miners. On one such occasion a stray bullet flew through the roof of their home and almost hit the 11-week-old Ron as he lay on his bed.

Because of Mt Mulligan's physical isolation, encouraging a sense of community was vital. This was achieved by regularly holding dance and social functions. These public entertainments became very important for bolstering local morale, especially after a massive explosion on 19 September 1921 killed 75 resident mine workers – one third of Mt Mulligan's adult population.

Concerts in the years following the disaster included performances by a very young Ron Erle Grainer, taught piano-playing from the age of four by his mother and encouraged to learn the violin by an elderly Welsh miner. As Grainer's music skills developed, he started demonstrating an ability to reconstruct tunes he had heard at school or on gramophone records. Mary Wardle, a classical music singer, historian, and former resident of Mt Mulligan, remembers Grainer performing on keyboard instruments "when he could barely reach the pedals."

=== Education ===
The Grainer family left Mt Mulligan in 1930. By April 1932 they were living in Aloomba, a sugar-growing rural community on the Far North Queensland coast. Aloomba is situated on the eastern side of another rock monolith, the 922-metre-high Walsh's Pyramid. At the age of 9, as part of the Aloomba school team, Grainer won second prize for solo violin at the inaugural Cairns and District School Eisteddfod. This is the first newspaper mention of him giving a music performance in public. In early 1933, Grainer's family moved to Cairns where, apart from school work at Edge Hill State (1933–1934) and Cairns High (1935–1936), he commenced a serious study of music theory and interpretation. His family relocated south to Brisbane in 1937 where Grainer completed his secondary school education at St Joseph's College, Nudgee, matriculating in 1938. He enrolled at the University of Queensland in 1939 to study civil engineering and music, a course which included harmony, counterpoint, and composition as taught by classical musician Percy Brier, a traditionalist educator who encouraged his more talented students to think for themselves. Grainer gained his Associate of Trinity College London Diploma (ATCL) on piano.

=== RAAF ===
After the outbreak of World War II, Grainer joined the Royal Australian Air Force (RAAF) in December 1940 and was sent to Amberley, Queensland, posted to 73 Signals, given a course at Point Cook and assigned to Radar Station No. 58, Townsville. While stationed there, and in subsequent similar postings, he contributed to barracks recreation activities by scoring and organising numerous servicemen shows. On March 22 1944 he was transferred to the RAAF entertainment unit. In the official report on his audition performance the only music piece mentioned by title was Ravel's Bolero, a seemingly simple instrumental riff which holds the listeners' attention in a similar manner to Grainer's later themes and signature tunes. Grainer had only a few months performing for his fellow airmen, for in July 1944, a 44-gallon drum fell on his leg while he was travelling in a truck; he sustained a severe injury and was admitted to the 3 RAAF Hospital, seriously ill. For a while, the air force medical team considered amputation, but Grainer eventually recovered. He was discharged from the RAAF as permanently medically unfit in September 1945. A rehabilitation course took him to the New South Wales State Conservatorium of Music, where he studied under Eugene Goossens.

=== Early musical education and career ===
Grainer received his teaching and performing diploma for pianoforte in December 1949. During 1950 and 1951 he began appearing in a series of solo artist radio shows for the Australian Broadcasting Commission. In August 1951 a presentation of Delius, Faure, and Milhaud compositions by Grainer on piano and Don Scott on violin was ridiculed in a newspaper review for the duo's "uncompromising disregard of mob appeal", "lack of practical concert sense", and "unrelievedly pastel colouring" set list that was "in need of a more impulsive and heartfelt spirit on the well tendered surface" having earlier said "by the time the programme ended the recital badly needed blood transfusion". By the mid-1950s Grainer had abandoned his classical repertoire and live concert work with such a determined change of attitude that he claimed in a 1964 magazine interview that he had "always loathed performing".

=== London ===
In 1952 Grainer left Australia for London with his wife Margot and 10-year-old stepdaughter Rel. He managed to find a three-month engagement playing piano in a nightclub along with other occasional jobs, the worst of which became a twelve-month stint with a touring Australian comedy act called "The Allen Brothers and June." This required the classically trained Grainer to be hit on the head nightly by a falling grand piano lid and then to topple over into the orchestra pit, an experience he later said was even harder to do than a day's fencing in the Australian outback.

At one stage, to pay the rent on their room, Grainer and his wife had to work as caretakers of a large block of London flats where he stoked two large boilers, morning and night, whilst Margot washed stairs and cleaned rooms.

To increase his public profile Grainer had two attempts at song contests: "England's Made of Us" (1956), an entry with lyricist David Dearlove for the First British Festival of Popular Song, which received the score of no points from the judges and, the following year, "Don't Cry Little Doll" (1957) (also written with David Dearlove), which reached fourth place in the British Eurovision entry decider heats.

Grainer's most dramatic pre-success music involvement was with Before The Sun Goes Down, a TV play which caused audience panic and questions to be raised in the British Parliament when it was shown on 20 February 1959. Taking inspiration from Orson Welles' 1938 radio drama of The War of the Worlds, the production used a similar format in which a regular programme broadcast was interrupted by a fake public service announcement. In this instance it was about a mysterious and "terrifying" satellite seen hovering over the city of London.

=== Maigret and after ===
In 1960 Grainer achieved public recognition with his theme and incidental music for the TV series Maigret. When Maigret was given the Ivor Novello "Outstanding Composition for Film, TV or Radio" award in 1961, commissions from a wide range of genres poured in: Goon Show silliness (It's a Square World, 1961), one-off pilots (Comedy Playhouse), documentaries (Terminus, 1961), kitchen sink drama (A Kind of Loving), quirky domestic sitcoms (Steptoe and Son 1962), classic serials (Oliver Twist 1962), teen films (Some People 1962), late night satire (That Was The Week That Was, 1962), outpost angst (Station Six Sahara, 1962), ballet (The King's Breakfast, 1963), science fiction (Doctor Who, 1963), psycho killers (Night Must Fall, 1964), children's adventure stories (The Moon Spinners, 1964), patriotic biography (The Finest Hours, 1964), big-budget musicals (Robert and Elizabeth, 1964), unusual love stories (Boy Meets Girl, 1967), acclaimed dramas To Sir, with Love (1967), allegorical social commentary (The Prisoner, 1967) and crime-caper movies (Only When I Larf, 1968).

Grainer also worked with the instrumental group The Eagles, who recorded a number of his themes.

Most of these projects required considerable research, group discussion, and creative team effort. They are only a small sample of work completed by Grainer from 1960 to 1968. He once indicated he felt a "trifle wistful" that so many people just associated him with the Doctor Who theme, the only tune in his extensive portfolio that had its sound dynamics realised by someone else – Delia Derbyshire of the BBC Radiophonic Workshop.

The time-consuming work commitments eventually contributed to the breakdown of Grainer's relationship with his wife; he and Margot divorced in 1966. Later that year, he married Jennifer Dodd (1944–2024), a member of the cast of Robert and Elizabeth. Their son Damian was born shortly afterwards.

=== Portugal ===
In September 1968, tired of London traffic jams and worried about his intensifying eyesight problems, Grainer moved permanently to his former retreat property in southern Portugal. He and Jenny started a farm growing organic fruit and vegetables, undertaking the planting and maintaining of 1,000 peach trees.

From 1969 to 1975, Grainer composed themes and soundtracks for an average of around one TV series and one film each year.

=== Return ===
In April 1974, the Carnation Revolution in Portugal prompted Grainer and his family to leave the country and return to England until the political climate cleared. Damian went first to boarding and then to day school. Grainer was being offered work again so he set up house in Keymer, West Sussex. In 1976, he and Jenny went through an amicable divorce as she had gone back to Portugal while he'd decided to remain in London. Over the next five years, Grainer had a second round of creativity, scoring the Emmy- and BAFTA-winning miniseries Edward & Mrs Simpson as well as Tales of the Unexpected (1979) and Rebecca (1979).

=== Final year ===
Grainer had one notable incidental music score and two TV signature tunes debut the year of his sudden illness and death from cancer on 21 February 1981.

Sunday Night Thriller, with its funeral music theme and separation of bodies credits sequence, was broadcast on 18 January 1981.

On 17 May 1981, his "All Things Bright And Beautiful" influenced ambient music for "The Sound Machine" episode of Tales of the Unexpected, accompanied a central character obsessed with "Sounds I long to hear – Songs beyond the planets".

The last of Grainer's TV themes, It Takes A Worried Man, was broadcast on 21 October 1981, and featured a closing credits film clip of the series hero gradually losing pieces of his torso and face until all that is left are his eyes.

Grainer died from a spinal tumour on 21 February 1981, aged 58.

== Compilations ==
Only three compilations of Grainer's output have been released commercially. 1969's Themes Like — (RCA) was a collection of his better known 1960s compositions. This was followed by Exciting Television Music of Ron Grainer (RCA, 1980), which covered the 1970s. In 1994 a career-spanning thirty-track CD was released as part of the A to Z of British TV Themes project on the Play it Again record label.

== Awards and nominations ==
=== Awards ===
- Maigret, 1961 Ivor Novello Award Outstanding Composition for Film, TV or Radio
- Steptoe and Son, 1962 Ivor Novello Award Outstanding Composition for Film, TV or Radio
- The Home Made Car 1963 Silver Bear Award, Short Film, Berlin International Film Festival

=== Nominations ===
- The Home Made Car (1963) Oscar, Best Short Subject, Academy Awards USA 1964
- Flickers (1980), BAFTA Best Television Music Award 1981
- Shelley (1979), BAFTA Best Television Music Award 1981
- Tales of the Unexpected (1979), BAFTA Best Television Music Award 1981

== Partial filmography ==
- Terminus (1961)
- A Kind of Loving (1962)
- Some People (1962)
- The Dock Brief (1962)
- Station Six-Sahara (1962)
- The King's Breakfast (1963)
- The Mouse on the Moon (1963)
- The Caretaker (1963)
- Nothing But the Best (1964)
- Night Must Fall (1964)
- The Moon-Spinners (1964)
- To Sir, with Love (1967)
- Only When I Larf (1968)
- Before Winter Comes (1969)
- The Assassination Bureau (1969)
- Lock Up Your Daughters (1969)
- In Search of Gregory (1969)
- Hoffman (1970)
- The Omega Man (1971)
- Mutiny on the Buses (1972)
- Yellow Dog (1973)
- Mousey (1974)
- I Don't Want to Be Born (1975)
- One Away (1976)
- The Bawdy Adventures of Tom Jones (1976)
- Never Never Land (1980)

== Selected television credits ==
- The Widow of Bath (1959)
- Maigret (1960)
- Comedy Playhouse (1961)
- That Was the Week That Was (1962)
- Steptoe and Son (1962)
- Giants of Steam (1963)
- The Home-Made Car (1963)
- Doctor Who (1963)
- Man in a Suitcase (1967)
- The Prisoner (1967)
- Paul Temple (1969)
- For the Love of Ada (1970)
- The Train Now Standing (1972)
- South Riding (1974)
- Edward & Mrs. Simpson (1978)
- Malice Aforethought (1979)
- Tales of the Unexpected (1979)
- Rebecca (1979 miniseries)
- Shelley (1979)
- Flickers (1980)
- Saturday Night Thriller (1981)
- It Takes A Worried Man (1981)

== Musicals ==
- 1962 – Cindy-Ella, pasticcio
- 1963 – The King's Breakfast
- 1964 – Robert and Elizabeth
- 1966 – Take A Sapphire
- 1966 – On the Level
- 1970 – Sing A Rude Song
- 1975 – Nickleby And Me
