= Giuseppina =

1960 British short film by James Hill

- Opening titles
- Directed by: James Hill
- Written by: James Hill
- Produced by: James Hill; Massimo Saraceni
- Starring: Antonia Scalari; Giulio Marchetti
- Cinematography: Václav Vích
- Edited by: Vivienne Collins
- Music by: Jack Beaver; Ray Beaver
- Production company: Schoenfeld Films
- Distributed by: BP
- Release date: 1960
- Running time: 28 minutes
- Countries: United Kingdom; Italy
- Language: Italian

Giuseppina is a 1960 short British documentary film produced by James Hill. It was filmed in 1959, in Mandriole, Emilia-Romagna, near Ravenna in the north east of Italy. It won the Academy Award for Best Documentary (Short Subject). Production of the film was sponsored by BP, which also distributed the film. The BP webpage summarizes the film as, "set at an Italian petrol station where various characters pass through on their onward journey, while entertaining and playing with the attendant's daughter, Giuseppina."

In the 1960s and early 1970s, Giuseppina was broadcast 185 times on British television as a trade test colour film. Excerpts were also shown on Vision On, the BBC programme for deaf and hard-of-hearing children. It was released as an extra on the BFI Flipside DVD release of "Lunch Hour".

== Cast ==
- Antonia Scalari as Giuseppina
- Giulio Marchetti as Rossi
