= Lunch Hour =

1962 British film by James Hill

- Opening titles
- Directed by: James Hill
- Written by: John Mortimer
- Based on: the play by John Mortimer
- Produced by: John Mortimer; Harold Orton
- Starring: Shirley Anne Field; Robert Stephens; Kay Walsh
- Cinematography: Wolfgang Suschitzky
- Edited by: Ted Hooker
- Music by: James Hill; Ian Orton
- Production company: Eyeline Productions
- Distributed by: Bryanston Films (UK)
- Release date: 1962
- Running time: 64 min.
- Language: English
- Budget: £22,750

Lunch Hour is a 1962 British romantic comedy drama film directed by James Hill and starring Shirley Anne Field, Robert Stephens and Kay Walsh. Written by John Mortimer based on his 1960 one-act play of the same name, it is about a man and a woman who attempt to conduct their affair during their lunch hour, but are continually interrupted.

== Plot ==
A recently graduated art school designer at a wallpaper manufacturing company catches the eye of a married middle manager. They begin a workplace affair during their lunchtime breaks but their attempts to find privacy are continually thwarted.

The man eventually locates a small hotel where he books a room for just one hour, but feels the need to invent a hugely complicated tale to tell the hotel manageress about a troubled marriage and a wife travelling down from Scarborough for a heart-to-heart.

The still-suspicious hotel manageress continually interrupts the couple and, as the man tells the same story to his would-be lover, she starts to believe the fantasy and sees herself as the stay-at-home wife, ironing the man's shirts, and she starts to have sympathy with the wife. The couple then argue over the woman's imagined life, and when their hour in the hotel ends, they depart separately to return to their work roles. There, the man appears sullen and unhappy, while the woman smiles quietly to herself as she works.

== Cast ==
- Shirley Anne Field as girl
- Robert Stephens as man
- Kay Walsh as manageress
- Hazel Hughes as auntie
- Michael Robbins as Harris
- Nigel Davenport as personnel manager
- Neil Culleton as little boy
- Sandra Leo as little girl
- Peter Ashmore as lecturer
- Vi Stevens as waitress

== Stage play ==
The play was first broadcast on the BBC Third Programme on 25 June 1960 with a repeat on 11 July, with Stephen Murray and Wendy Craig.

It debuted on stage in 1961 as part of a triple bill, alongside A Slight Ache by Harold Pinter and The Form by N.F. Simpson and was well received. The cast comprised Emlyn Williams and Wendy Craig with whom Mortimer had an affair and conceived a son. "It was the Sixties and we were all a lot more excitable then," said Mortimer. According to Mortimer's biographer Valerie Grove, his affair with Craig during the production of his play The Wrong Side of the Park may have inspired the writing of Lunch Hour.

Mortimer wrote a TV adaptation of the play, Kings Cross Lunch Hour, which was broadcast on 29 May 1972 as part of BBC Two's Thirty Minute Theatre series, with Joss Ackland and Pauline Collins.

== Production ==
Maggie Smith was considered for the female lead but the role ended up going to Shirley Ann Field who was given 7% of the profits.

The film was shot at Marylebone Studios in London, a church near Baker Street.

Field said "we did it, as you can guess, on a shoestring ... and we all worked on a percentage of what the picture will make. The point is, we all felt that it had something important to say about the rootlessness and confusion that face young people in England today since they literally have no place to go and be alone except on lunch hour. We think it's bigger than it sounds in this kind of explanation".

Field described it as perhaps "the most enjoyable film I'd ever done" because the cast and crew all worked so closely together.

== Reception ==
Sight and Sound wrote: "John Mortimer's almost-adulterous drama about an illicit rendezvous between nervous London co-workers is a sharp-eyed snapshot of a society still mired in post-war prudishness but on the brink of swinging. ... Cosy rather than cutting but with a strong whiff of cultural change ... its zesty exploration of empowering female frustration makes it a thought-provoking addition to the lad-centric catalogue of early 1960s British cinema".

Time Out wrote that the film: "is redolent of the early '60s (post-Austerity, pre-Swinging), from its Theatre of the Absurd affectations to the way it manages to be simultaneously liberating and oppressive."

The British Film Institute describe the film as "a truly visual adaptation of the original radio play, with back stories and a number of exterior scenes added – although the climactic hotel encounter remains suitably shuttered and claustrophobic. The film never achieved a major release, perhaps because of its short length or because its absurdist influences invited classification alongside European art-house cinema."

The Radio Times Guide to Films gave the film 2/5 stars, writing: "Directed at a fair lick by James Hill, this lively romp is admirably played, with Kay Walsh and Nigel Davenport's supporting turns particularly worthy of note, but there's often an excess of chat between the excruciating moments."

In his obituary of Field for The Guardian, Peter Bradshaw called the film: "her 60s masterpiece", writing "Field is excellent: smart, seductive, but sweetly vulnerable and yet determined. Lunch Hour has all the New Wave preoccupations with class and pre-Pill sexual morality of the time, but unlike Alfie or Saturday Night and Sunday Morning it gives Field something substantial to do."

== Home media ==
The film was released on DVD in 2011 via the BFI Flipside label, and also by Renown Pictures.
