= Trade test colour films =

Trade test colour films were broadcast by the television network BBC2 in the early days of colour television in Britain during the long periods of the daytime when no regular programming was scheduled, with the exception of Play School. The goal of these transmissions was to provide colour broadcasting in these intervals for use by television shops and engineers (the 'trade') to install, adjust and demonstrate their television sets. The earliest such transmission was made in 1956 (on the then sole BBC channel) but regular all-day-long films ran from autumn 1967 until 24 August 1973. In all, 158 different films were broadcast; on average, each film was shown 90 times. The colour films provided moving colour images to allow tv dealers to demonstrate sets to customers. The decision to stop showing them followed the extension of broadcasting hours on BBC1 and ITV. This, together with the gradual move of schools programmes into colour, meant there was less need to provide moving pictures during trade tests simply to demonstrate sets.

The frequent broadcasting of the films made them well known to some viewers of the time. The one most frequently shown was The Captive River (1960), which was shown 525 times. The short film Giuseppina (1959), which had won an Academy Award, was shown 158 times and became the last trade test colour transmission on August 24, 1973. Other frequently broadcast films included The Home Made Car (1963), The North Sea Quest (BP, 1967), Overhaul (1957), Crown of Glass (1967), Roads to Roam (1967), The Small Propeller (BP, 1967), The Cattle Carters (BP, 1962) – with a theme song sung by Frank Ifield, Prospect for Plastics (1962), Evoluon (1968) and Cantagallo.

A number of these films were produced by the oil company BP, including We've Come a Long Way (1951), The Shadow of Progress, Newspaper Run, and Skyhook. Other films included Paint (produced by Shell), Study in Steel (produced by British Steel Corporation), Algerian Pipeline (Constructors John Brown Ltd), The Captive River (Shell), Ride the White Horses (Ford Film Unit), Something Nice To Eat (the Gas Council), It's The Tube That Makes The Colour (Mullard), On the Safe Side (1967, UKAEA), Oil Underground (1960, Shell) and Transport Ability (UKAEA). Another film, Birth of a Rainbow (1967), about trout farms, was made by the New Zealand National Film Unit, while Network (1962) was made by the AEI, and No Claim Bonus (1963) was made by the COI. The Gold Miners was made by Films of Africa, and A Journey into the Weald of Kent (1959) and Beauty in Trust were made by the National Benzole Company with narrations by Sir John Betjeman.

The trade test colour films are among the subjects of interest of the Test Card Circle, an organization devoted to studying and preserving the test cards used by television broadcasters. The static test cards were typically transmitted for periods before and after regular programming, originally to permit viewers to adjust their television sets.

== BBC2 daily schedule ==
According to the BBC Written Archive Centre, the following is an example of a typical day on BBC 2 in the late 1960s when the only scheduled programme during the day was Play School at 11 am:

09.00 Colour Testcard F
10.00 Service Information For The Television Trade
10.03 Colour Testcard F
10.30 The Colour Receiver Installation Film
10.43 TRADE TEST COLOUR FILM followed by Colour Testcard F
11.00 Play School followed by Colour Testcard F
11.30 Service Information For The Television Trade
11.33 TRADE TEST COLOUR FILM followed by Colour Testcard F
12.10 The Colour Receiver Installation Film
12.23 Colour Testcard F
2.30 Service Information For The Television Trade
2.33 TRADE TEST COLOUR FILM followed by Colour Testcard F
3.10 The Colour Receiver Installation Film
3.23 Colour Testcard F
3.30 TRADE TEST COLOUR FILM followed by Colour Testcard F
4.30 TRADE TEST COLOUR FILM followed by Colour Testcard F
5.30 TRADE TEST COLOUR FILM followed by Colour Testcard F
6.30 TRADE TEST COLOUR FILM followed by Colour Testcard F
